= Roman Catholic Diocese of Cariati =

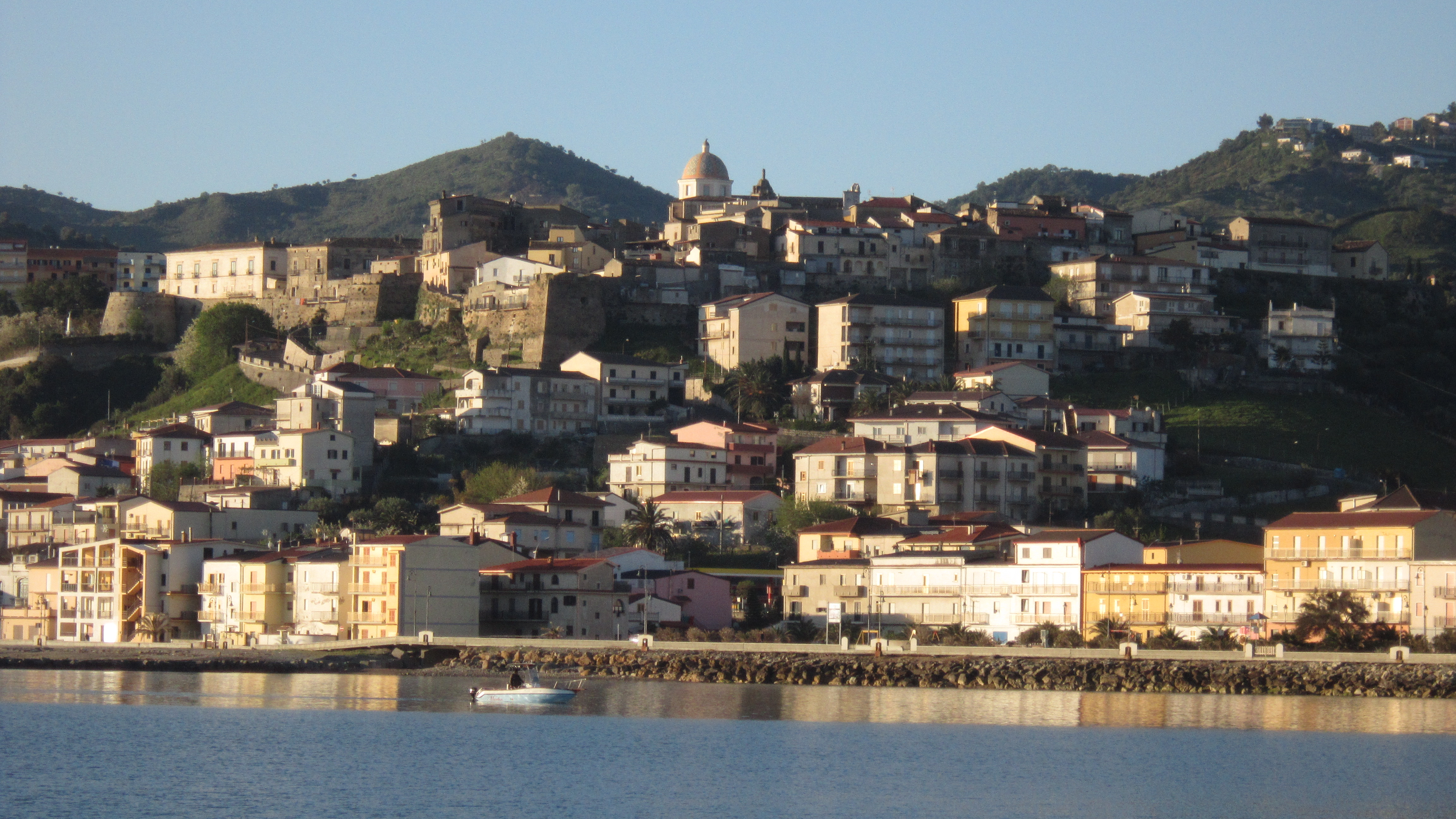
Cariati: the cathedral of S. Michele Archangelo, with the dome, is on the citadel

The Italian Catholic diocese of Cariati, in Calabria, existed until 1979. In that year it was united into the archdiocese of Rossano-Cariati. The diocese was a suffragan of the archdiocese of Santa Severina, and then of the archdiocese of Reggio Calabria. In 2001, it became a suffragan of the Archdiocese of Cosenza-Bisignano.

== History ==
It has been claimed that the first bishop of Cariati mentioned in history is Menecrates, who was present at the Synod of Rome in 499. The list of bishops attending tha first Roman synod, however, contains neither the name Menecrades nor the diocese Cariatensis. Neither name nor diocese appears in the subscription list of the third Roman synod, held in October 501; or in the fourth, held in November. At the fifth synod, held in 503, with 218 bishops in attendance, many of them from the Greek east, the name "Menecrates Caryssensis" does appear. He subscribes after the bishops of Tripolis and Gabala, and immediately before the bishop of Sardis. It is more likely that he is the bishop of the well-known Carystus, than that he is the bishop of a putative Cariati.

Pope Gregory I, it is claimed, mentioned Cariati in a letter to the Bishop of Reggio. In 595, Pope Gregory I wrote to Bishop Boniface of Reggio Calabria, ordering him to hasten to fill the vacancy in the diocese of "Carinensis". This is the diocese of Carini, a suffragan of Reggio, not Cariati.

According to some, during the eleventh or twelfth century the diocese of Cerenza (Geruntia, Gerenza) was united to Cariati, though it is only in 1342 that mention is made of a Bishop of Cariati and Cerenza. The bishop of Cerenza, Polychronius, with the cooperation of Archbishop Constantine of Santa Severina, rebuilt the monastery of S. Maria in Altilia, which was endowed by Duke Roger of Apulia (1099).

Among the bishops of Cerenza was the Cistercian Matteo (attested as bishop in 1234), who was the first successor of Joachim da Fiore as Abbot of San Giovanni di Fiore, in 1202.

=== Foundation ===
The diocese of Cariati was canonically erected by Pope Eugenius IV in 1445, and immediately united aeque principaliter with the diocese of Cerenza. Its territory had formerly belonged to the archdiocese of Rossano. The cathedral of Cariati is dedicated to S. Michele Archangelo; and the cathedral of Cerenza to S. Theodore.

A diocesan synod of the diocese of Cariati e Cerenza was held in Cariati on 16–18 March 1726, by Bishop Giovanni Andrea Tria (1720–1726).

=== The Napoleonic disruption and restoration ===
From 1802 to 1818 the see of Cerenza e Cariati remained vacant. From 1806–1808, Naples was occupied by the French, and Joseph Bonaparte was made king, after Napoleon had deposed King Ferdinand IV. Joseph Bonaparte was succeeded by Joachim Murat from 1808 until the fall of Napoleon in 1815. Pope Pius VII was a prisoner of Napoleon in France from 1809 to 1815, and was both unable and unwilling to make new episcopal appointments. The French expelled all monks, nuns, and Jesuits from the kingdom, and closed the monasteries and convents; colleges of canons were also closed. Their assets were seized, to be used for "the benefit of the people."

Following the extinction of the Napoleonic Kingdom of Italy, the Congress of Vienna authorized the restoration of the Papal States and the Kingdom of Naples. Since the French occupation had seen the abolition of many Church institutions in the Kingdom, as well as the confiscation of most Church property and resources, it was imperative that Pope Pius VII and King Ferdinand IV reach agreement on restoration and restitution. Ferdinand, however, was not prepared to accept the pre-Napoleonic situation, in which Naples was a feudal subject of the papacy. Neither was he prepared to accept the large number of small dioceses in his kingdom; following French intentions, he demanded the suppression of fifty dioceses. Lengthy, detailed, and acrimonious negotiations ensued. On 17 July 1816, King Ferdinand issued a decree, in which he forbade the reception of any papal document without prior reception of the royal exequatur. This meant that prelates could not receive bulls of appointment, consecration, or installation without the king's permission.

A concordat was finally signed on 16 February 1818, and ratified by Pius VII on 25 February 1818. Ferdinand issued the concordat as a law on 21 March 1818. The re-erection of the dioceses of the kingdom and the ecclesiastical provinces took more than three years. The right of the king to nominate the candidate for a vacant bishopric was recognized, as in the Concordat of 1741, subject to papal confirmation (preconisation). On 27 June 1818, Pius VII issued the bull De Ulteriore, in which he reestablished the metropolitan archbishopric of Santa Severina, but with only one suffragan diocese, the diocese of Cariati. The diocese of Belcastro was suppressed completely, and its territory incorporated into the archdiocese of Santa Severina. The diocese of Cerenza, which had been united with the diocese of Cariati aeque principaliter, was suppressed and its territory completely incorporated into the diocese of Cariati. In addition, the dioceses of Strongoli and Umbriatico, which also had been united aeque principaliter, were both suppressed, and their territories permanently incorporated into the diocese of Cariati.

Bishop Niccola Golia (1839–1873) attended the First Vatican Council in 1869–1870.

=== Diocesan reorganization ===
The Second Vatican Council (1962–1965), in order to ensure that all Catholics received proper spiritual attention, decreed the reorganization of the diocesan structure of Italy and the consolidation of small and struggling dioceses. It also recommended the abolition of anomalous units such as exempt territorial prelatures.

On 4 April 1979, Pope John Paul II carried out a major reorganization of the ecclesiastical provinces of Campania and Calabria. The towns of Belvedere di Spinello, Caccuri, Carfizzi, Casabona, Castelsilano, Cerenzia, Ciro, Ciro Marina, Crucoli, Melissa, Pallagorio, S. Nicola dell'Alto, Savelli, Strongoli, Umbriatico, and Verzino were removed from the diocese of Cariati and assigned to the diocese of Croton. With its sixteen towns removed, the diocese of Cariati was permanently united aeque principaliter to the archdiocese of Rossano, as Rossano e Cariati.

On 30 September 1986, Pope John Paul II ordered that the dioceses of Rossano e Cariati be merged into one diocese with one bishop, with the Latin title Archidioecesis Rossanensis-Cariatensis. The seat of the diocese was to be in Rossano, and the cathedral of Rossano was to serve as the cathedral of the merged dioceses. The cathedral in Cariati was to become a co-cathedral, and the cathedral Chapter was to be a Capitulum Concathedralis. There was to be only one diocesan Tribunal, in Rossano, and likewise one seminary, one College of Consultors, and one Priests' Council. The territory of the new diocese was to include the territory of the former dioceses of Rossano and Cariati. However, the united diocese was now made a suffragan of the metropolitan archdiocese of Reggio-Bova.

This situation changed again in 2001, when Pope John Paul II further reformed the diocesan structure of Calabria. On 30 January 2001, he ordered that the metropolitan status of the archdiocese of Cosenza-Bisignano be restored, and that it be assigned as suffragans the dioceses of Rossano-Cariata and Cassano, which were removed from the jurisdiction of the archdiocese of Reggio Calabria.

It is now the Arcidiocesi di Rossano-Cariati.

== Bishops of Cariati e Cerenzia ==
United: 1445 with the Diocese of Cerenzia
Latin Name: Cariatensis et Geruntina
Metropolitan: Archdiocese of Santa Severina

assumed title by bishops of Cerenza

- Nicolaus (elected 1342)
- Hugo
- Joannes Fardini, O.P (1372–1391?)
- Jacobus
- Gerardus
- Guillelmus (1394–1420)
- Tommaso Rubeus (Rossi) (1420–1429)
- Guillelmus de Podio (1429–1437)

official title

- Giovanni de Volta (1437–1481)
- Petrus de Sonnino (1481–1489)
- Franciscus (1489–1500)
- Girolamo Candido, O.F.M. (20 Nov 1500 – 1504 Died)

- Bishop-elect Francesco Dentice (7 Mar 1504 – 1505 Died)

- Martino de Lignano, O.P. (6 Oct 1505 – 1506 Died)
- Giovanni Sarsali (21 Aug 1506 – )
- Antonio Ercolano (21 May 1520 – 1528 Resigned)
- Tommaso Cortesi (16 Jan 1529 – 3 Mar 1533 Appointed, Bishop of Vaison)
- Taddeo Pepoli, O.S.B. (3 Mar 1533 – 15 Jan 1535 Appointed, Bishop of Carinola)
- Juan Canuti (15 Jan 1535 – 1545 Died)
- Marco Antonio Falconi (17 Apr 1545 – 1556 Died)
- Federico Fantuzzi (5 Jul 1557 – 1561 Died)
- Alessandro Crivelli (10 Mar 1561 – 23 Jan 1568 Resigned)
- Pietro Giacomo Malombra (23 Jan 1568 – 1573 Resigned)
- Sebastiano Maffo (9 Mar 1573 – 1576 Died)
- Giovanni Battista Ansaldo (24 Oct 1576 – 1578 Died)
- Tarquinio Prisco (14 Nov 1578 – 1585 Died)
- Cesare Nardo, O.F.M. Conv. (9 Sep 1585 – 1586 Died)
- Properzio Resta, O.F.M. Conv. (5 Nov 1586 – 6 May 1601 Died)
- Filippo Gesualdo, O.F.M. Conv. (15 Apr 1602 – 1619 Died)
- Maurizio Ricci (8 Apr 1619 – 1627 Died)
- Lorenzo Fei (29 Nov 1627 – Aug 1631 Died)
- Francesco Gonzaga, C.R. (21 Feb 1633 – 17 Dec 1657 Appointed, Bishop of Nola)
- Agazio di Somma (13 Jan 1659 – 28 Apr 1664 Appointed, Bishop of Catanzaro)
- Girolamo Barzellini (21 Jul 1664 – 8 Apr 1688 Died)
- Sebastiano Delli Frangi (9 Aug 1688 – Oct 1714 Died)
- Bartolomeo Porzio (6 Apr 1718 – Nov 1719 Died)
- Giovanni Andrea Tria (seniore) (4 Mar 1720 – 23 Dec 1726 Appointed, Bishop of Larino)
- Marco Antonio Raimundi (23 Dec 1726 – 22 Sep 1732)
- Carlo Ronchi (19 Dec 1732 – 9 Jan 1764)
- Franciscus Maria Trombini (9 Apr 1764 – 28 Jul 1785)
- Felice Antonio d’Alessandria (26 Mar 1792 Confirmed –1802)

== Bishops of Cariati ==
Reorganization: 1818
Metropolitan: Archdiocese of Santa Severina

- Gelasio Serao (4 Jun 1819 Confirmed – 1838 Died)
- Niccola Golia (11 Jul 1839 Confirmed – 27 Apr 1873 Died)
- Pietro Maglione (15 Jun 1874 – 18 Dec 1876 Appointed, Bishop of Capaccio e Vallo della Lucania)
- Giuseppe Antonio Virdia, O.F.M. Conv. (12 Mar 1877 – 23 Feb 1903 Resigned)
- Lorenzo Chieppa (22 Jun 1903 – 23 Jun 1909 Appointed, Bishop of Lucera)
- Giovanni Scotti (21 Feb 1911 – 13 Dec 1918 Appointed, Archbishop of Rossano)
- Giuseppe Antonio Caruso (10 Mar 1919 – 26 Aug 1927 Appointed, Bishop of Oppido Mamertina)
- Eugenio Raffaele Faggiano, C.P. (15 Feb 1936 – 25 Sep 1956 Retired)
- Orazio Semeraro (22 Mar 1957 – 30 Apr 1967 Appointed, Coadjutor Archbishop of Brindisi)
- Giuseppe Agostino (21 Dec 1973 Appointed - 4 Apr 1979 Resigned)

== See also ==
- Roman Catholic Archdiocese of Cosenza-Bisignano
- Roman Catholic Archdiocese of Rossano-Cariati
- Roman Catholic Archdiocese of Santa Severina
- Cerenzia (Roman Catholic Diocese)
- List of Catholic dioceses in Italy

== Bibliography ==
=== Reference works for bishops ===
- Gams, Pius Bonifatius (1873). Series episcoporum Ecclesiae catholicae: quotquot innotuerunt a beato Petro apostolo (in Latin). Ratisbon: Typis et Sumptibus Georgii Josephi Manz. p. 869. (Use with caution; obsolete)
- Eubel, Conradus, ed. (1913). Hierarchia catholica, Tomus 1 (in Latin) (second ed.). Münster: Libreria Regensbergiana.
- Eubel, Conradus, ed. (1914). Hierarchia catholica, Tomus 2 (in Latin) (second ed.). Münster: Libreria Regensbergiana.
- Eubel, Conradus; Gulik, Guilelmus (1923). Hierarchia catholica, Tomus 3 (in Latin) (second ed.). Münster: Libreria Regensbergiana.
- Gauchat, Patritius (Patrice) (1935). Hierarchia catholica (in Latin). Vol. IV (1592-1667). Münster: Libraria Regensbergiana.
- Ritzler, Remigius; Sefrin, Pirminus (1952). Hierarchia catholica medii et recentis aevi V (1667-1730) (in Latin). Patavii: Messagero di S. Antonio.
- Ritzler, Remigius; Sefrin, Pirminus (1958). Hierarchia catholica medii et recentis aevi VI (1730-1799) (in Latin). Patavii: Messagero di S. Antonio.
- Ritzler, Remigius; Sefrin, Pirminus (1968). Hierarchia Catholica medii et recentioris aevi sive summorum pontificum, S. R. E. cardinalium, ecclesiarum antistitum series... A pontificatu Pii PP. VII (1800) usque ad pontificatum Gregorii PP. XVI (1846) (in Latin). Vol. VII. Monasterii: Libr. Regensburgiana.

=== Studies ===
- Cappelletti, Giuseppe (1870). Le chiese d'Italia: dalla loro origine sino ai nostri giorni. (in Italian). Vol. vigesimoprimo (21). Venezia: G. Antonelli. pp. 257-263.
- Kehr, Paulus Fridolin (1975). Italia pontificia. Regesta pontificum Romanorum. (in Latin) Vol. X: Calabria–Insulae. Berlin: Weidmann.
- Taccone-Gallucci, Domenico (1902). Regesti dei Romani pontefici della Calabria. (in Latin and Italian) Roma: Tip. Vaticana, 1902. pp. 427-428.
- Torelli, Felice (1848), La chiave del concordato dell'anno 1818. (in Italian and Latin) Vol. I, second edition (Naples: Fibreno 1848)
- Ughelli, Ferdinando; Coleti, Niccolo (1721). Italia Sacra Sive De Episcopis Italiae, Et Insularum adiacentium (in Latin). Vol. Tomus nonus (9). Venice: Antonio Coleti. pp. 498–505.
