= Settimio =

Settimio is an Italian masculine given name. Notable people with the name include:

- Settimio Borsari (died 1594), Italian Roman Catholic bishop
- Settimio Ferrazzetta (1924–1999), Italian-born Guinea-Bissauan Roman Catholic bishop
- Settimio Lucci (born 1965), Italian football player and coach
- Settimio Piacentini (1859–1921), Italian general
- Settimio Simonini (1913–1986), Italian racing cyclist
- Settimio Todisco (1924–2025), Italian Roman Catholic archbishop

== See also ==
- Settimia Caccini (1591–c. 1638), Italian soprano and composer
- Septimius (usurper) (in Italian: Settimio), 3rd-century Roman usurper
