= Bernardino Plastina =

17th-century Roman Catholic bishop

Most Reverend Bernardino Plastina
- Bishop of Oppido Mamertina
- Church: Catholic Church
- Diocese: Diocese of Oppido Mamertina
- In office: 1694–1697
- Predecessor: Vincenzo Ragni
- Successor: Bisanzio Fili

Orders
- Ordination: 17 Dec 1667
- Consecration: 31 Jan 1694 by Pier Matteo Petrucci

Personal details
- Born: 10 Nov 1645 Fuscaldo, Italy
- Died: 16 Feb 1697 (age 51)

Bernardino Plastina, O.M. (1645–1697) was a Roman Catholic prelate who served as Bishop of Oppido Mamertina (1694–1697).

== Biography ==
Bernardino Plastina was born on 10 Nov 1645 in Fuscaldo, Italy and ordained a priest on 17 Dec 1667 in the Order of the Minims. On 25 Jan 1694, he was appointed during the papacy of Pope Innocent XII as Bishop of Oppido Mamertina. On 31 Jan 1694, he was consecrated bishop by Pier Matteo Petrucci, Cardinal-Priest of San Marcello al Corso, with Giovanni Battista Visconti Aicardi, Bishop of Novara, and Gennaro Crespino, Bishop of Minori, serving as co-consecrators. He served as Bishop of Oppido Mamertina until his death on 16 Feb 1697.

== External links and additional sources ==
- Cheney, David M. "Diocese of Oppido Mamertina-Palmi". Catholic-Hierarchy.org. (for Chronology of Bishops) ^{[self-published]}
- Chow, Gabriel. "Diocese of Oppido Mamertina-Palmi (Italy)". GCatholic.org. (for Chronology of Bishops) ^{[self-published]}

Catholic Church titles
Preceded by Vincenzo Ragni	Bishop of Oppido Mamertina; 1694–1697	Succeeded by Bisanzio Fili
