= Diocese of Bova =

Latin Catholic diocese in Italy (7th century - 1986)

The Diocese of Bova was a Latin Church diocese of the Catholic Church in Bova, Calabria, Italy from the seventh century until 1986.

== Ordinaries ==
=== Diocese of Bova ===
Erected: 7th Century
Latin name: Bovensis
Metropolitan: Archdiocese of Reggio Calabria

- Giovanni Dominici (1412–1419 Died)

...

- Sante (1435–1441 Resigned)

...

- Marcello Franci (1577–)
- Bartolomeo Corsini (1587–1590 Died)
- Giovanni Camerota (1592–1622 Died)
- Nicola Maria Madaffari (2 May 1622 – 1627 Died)
- Fabio Olivadisi (1627–1646 Appointed, Bishop of Catanzaro)
- Martino Megali (1646–1656 Died)
- Bernardino d'Aragona (1657–1669 Died)
- Marco Antonio Contestabile (1669–1699 Died)
- Francesco Antonio Gaudiosi (1699–1714 Died)
- Paolo Stabile (1718–1729 Died)
- Giuseppe Barone (1729–1731 Appointed, Bishop of Marsi)
- Tommaso Giosafat Melina 1731–1735 Died)
- Domenico de Marzano (1735–1752 Died)
- Stefano Moràbito (1752–1764 Resigned)
- Antonio Spedalieri (1764–1791 Died)
- Giuseppe Martini (1792–1802 Died)
- Nicola-Maria Laudisio (1819–1824 Confirmed, Bishop of Policastro)
- Giovanni Corcione (1824–1830 Died)
- Giuseppe Maria Giove (1832–1834 Confirmed, Bishop of Gallipoli)
- Vincenzo Rozzolino (1835–1849 Confirmed, Bishop of Caserta)
- Pasquale Taccone (1849–1850 Confirmed, Bishop of Teramo)
- Raffaele Ferrigno (1851–1856 Confirmed, Archbishop of Brindisi)
- Dalmazio d'Andrea (1856–1870 Died)
- Antonio Piterà (1871–1876 Resigned)
- Nicola de Simone (1877–1895 Died)
- Raffaele Rossi (1895–1899 Appointed, Archbishop of Acerenza e Matera)
- Domenico Pugliatti (1900–1914 Died)
- Paolo Albera (1915–1921 Resigned)
- Andrea Taccone (1923–1929 Appointed, Bishop of Ruvo e Bitonto)
- Giuseppe Cognata (1933–1940 Resigned)
- Enrico Montalbetti (1941–1943 Died)
- Antonio Lanza (1943–1950 Died)
- Giovanni Ferro (1950–1960 Resigned)
- Giuseppe Lenotti (1960–1962 Appointed, Bishop of Foggia)
- Aureliano Sorrentino (1962–1966 Appointed, Bishop of Potenza e Marsico Nuovo)
- Giovanni Ferro (1973–1977 Retired)
- Aureliano Sorrentino (1977–1986 Appointed, Archbishop of Reggio Calabria-Bova)
