= Luciano Bux =

Italian Roman Catholic bishop (1936–2014)

- Bishop of Oppido Mamertina-Palmi
- Church: Catholic Church
- Diocese: Diocese of Oppido Mamertina-Palmi
- In office: 5 February 2000 – 2 July 2011
- Predecessor: Domenico Crusco
- Successor: Francesco Milito
- Previous posts: Titular Bishop of Aurusuliana (1995-2000); Auxiliary Bishop of Bari-Bitonto (1995-2000)

Orders
- Ordination: 2 July 1961
- Consecration: 25 March 1995 by Andrea Mariano Magrassi

Personal details
- Born: 29 June 1936 Bari, Province of Bari, Kingdom of Italy
- Died: 8 August 2014 (aged 78)

Luciano Bux (29 June 1936 – 8 August 2014) was a Roman Catholic bishop.

Born in Bari, he was ordained to the priesthood in 1961. Father Bux was appointed titular bishop of Aurusuliana, and auxiliary bishop of Bari-Bitonio in 1995.

In 2000, Bux was appointed Bishop of the Diocese of Oppido Mamertina-Palmi. Bux retired in 2011 on his 75th birthday, and died in 2014, aged 78.
