= Filippo Visconti =

Filippo Visconti may refer to:

- Filippo Maria Visconti (1392–1447), Duke of Milan
- Filippo Visconti (bishop) (1596–1664), Roman Catholic Bishop of Catanzaro
- Filippo Maria Visconti (bishop) (1721–1801), Archbishop of Milan
