= Ciliberti =

Ciliberti is an Italian surname. Notable people with the surname include:

- Antonio Ciliberti (1935–2017), Italian Roman Catholic archbishop
- Barrie Ciliberti (born 1936), American professor and politician
