= Catholic lay organisations =

A Catholic lay association is an association of lay Catholics.

Some of the best known Catholic lay associations are Knights of Columbus, Knights of Columba, Catenians, Knights of Malta, the Piusverein in Germany and Switzerland, Azione Cattolica in Italy and the UK-based Catholic Truth Society. There are also lay Catholic guilds and associations representing a whole range of professions. These include the Catholic Police Guild, Holy Name Society (NYPD), the Association of Catholic Nurses, the Guild of Catholic Doctors, the Catholic Physicians Guild, the Catholic Association of Performing Arts (UK), and the Catholic Actors Guild of America. Note that, officially, no organisation may use the name "Catholic" without "the consent of the lawful Church authority".

== History ==
Historically, Catholic congresses have been held, aimed at discussing certain political or social issues from a Catholic perspective.

The Second Vatican Council commented on the variety of associations involving lay people in its Decree on the Lay Apostolate (1965), and noted especially that associations "which promote and encourage closer unity between the concrete life of the members and their faith" were to be prioritised. The Pontifical Council for the Laity is the body responsible for approving those Catholic associations that exist at an international level. The structure of some Religious Orders allow for lay members' branches to be associated with them. These are often referred to as Third Orders.

The same Council mentioned the role Catholic associations in fostering vocations its Decree on Priestly Training, also published in 1965.

== Examples of Catholic lay organisations ==
Listed here are some examples of organisations involving Catholic lay people.

- Apostolate for Family Consecration, founded in the United States in 1975 by Jerry and Gwen Conker
- Movimento Apostolico, a lay organization founded in Catanzaro, Italy, on 3 November 1979 by Maria Marino Marraffa. Archbishop Antonio Cantisani and the Calabrian Bishops Conference approved its statutes but it is now suppressed.
- Catholic Charismatic Renewal, with around 70 million Roman Catholics worldwide active in the movement, founded in the United States in 1967 among college students.
- The Catholic Women's League, founded in England in 1906
- Catholic Worker Movement: founded in the US in 1933 by Dorothy Day and Peter Maurin, this movement works for peace and the equal distribution of goods.
- Madonna House Apostolate, founded in Canada in 1947 by Catherine Doherty as a community of priests and laypersons has established missionary field houses worldwide.
- National Black Catholic Congress, founded in the United States in 1987 as a successor to the Colored Catholic Congress founded a century earlier by Daniel Rudd.
- World Movement of Christian Workers (WMCW), an international association similar to the Catholic Worker Movement, recognized by the Catholic Church.

== Catholic congresses ==
Martin Spahn and Thomas Meehan, in a 1913 Catholic Encyclopedia article, provide a historical survey of national and international Catholic Congresses taking place against changing social and political backgrounds since the mid-nineteenth century. The first "Catholic congress" to which they refer took place in Germany in 1848. Internationally, "general congresses" and "Eucharistic congresses" have taken place in various locations.

== Union of Prayer ==
The term Union of Prayer referred to some Roman Catholic lay ecclesial movements. They tended to be archconfraternities aiming at the conversion of various groups to Catholicism. Some of these included:

- Association of Prayer and Penitence in honour of the Heart of Jesus, concerned with offering reparation for outrages against the Catholic Church and the pope
- Archconfraternity of Our Lady of Compassion for the Return of England to the Catholic Faith
- Pious Union of Prayer to Our Lady of Compassion for the Conversion of Heretics
- Archconfraternity of Prayers and Good Works for the Reunion of the Eastern Schismatics with the Church under the patronage of Our Lady of the Assumption

== See also ==
- Catholic laity
- Catholic charities
