= Movimento Apostolico =

logo of apostolic movement

The Movimento Apostolico is a Catholic lay association founded in the Archdiocese of Catanzaro-Squillace, Italy in 1979, based on reported supernatural revelations attributed to Maria Marino Marraffa. It operated within the Catholic Church until its suppression by the Holy See in 2021, following an apostolic visitation.

== History ==
The Movimento Apostolico was founded on 3 November 1979 in Catanzaro, Italy. It functioned as a Catholic lay movement focused on catechesis, musical activities, conferences, meetings and evangelization. During the 1980s, the movement expanded within Italy, forming communities connected to diocesan and parish structures. In August 1987, a delegation of its members was received in a private audience by Pope John Paul II at Castel Gandolfo. Over time, the movement organized catechetical and formative activities and developed a network of communities.

=== Suppression ===
In June 2021, the Dicastery for the Laity, Family and Life ordered the suppression of the movement following an apostolic visitation conducted in 2020. According to reports, the decision was based on concerns regarding governance and doctrinal issues. The Holy See also stated that the alleged supernatural origins associated with the founder were not recognized as authentic. The Vatican further noted divisions within the Archdiocese of Catanzaro-Squillace, particularly among clergy, linked to the activities of the movement. Statements from local Church authorities emphasized that the positive elements experienced by members would not be lost despite the suppression. The decision received coverage in national and international media. Following the suppression of the movement and the death of its founder Maria Marino Marraffa, initiatives aimed at preserving and documenting the movement's historical and spiritual legacy continued. Among these efforts was a letter submitted by her grandson Paolo Marraffa to Pope Leo XIV, calling for a re-examination of the movement's history and the preservation of the founder's spiritual legacy.
