= Religious of the Perpetual Adoration =

Religious congregation of the Catholic Church

- Founder: Sister Elizabeth Zwirer
- Origin: 1526; Einsiedeln, Switzerland

The Religious of the Perpetual Adoration was a religious congregation of the Catholic Church. It was founded by Sister Elizabeth Zwirer, in Einsiedeln, Switzerland, 1526, following the Benedictine rule.

== History ==
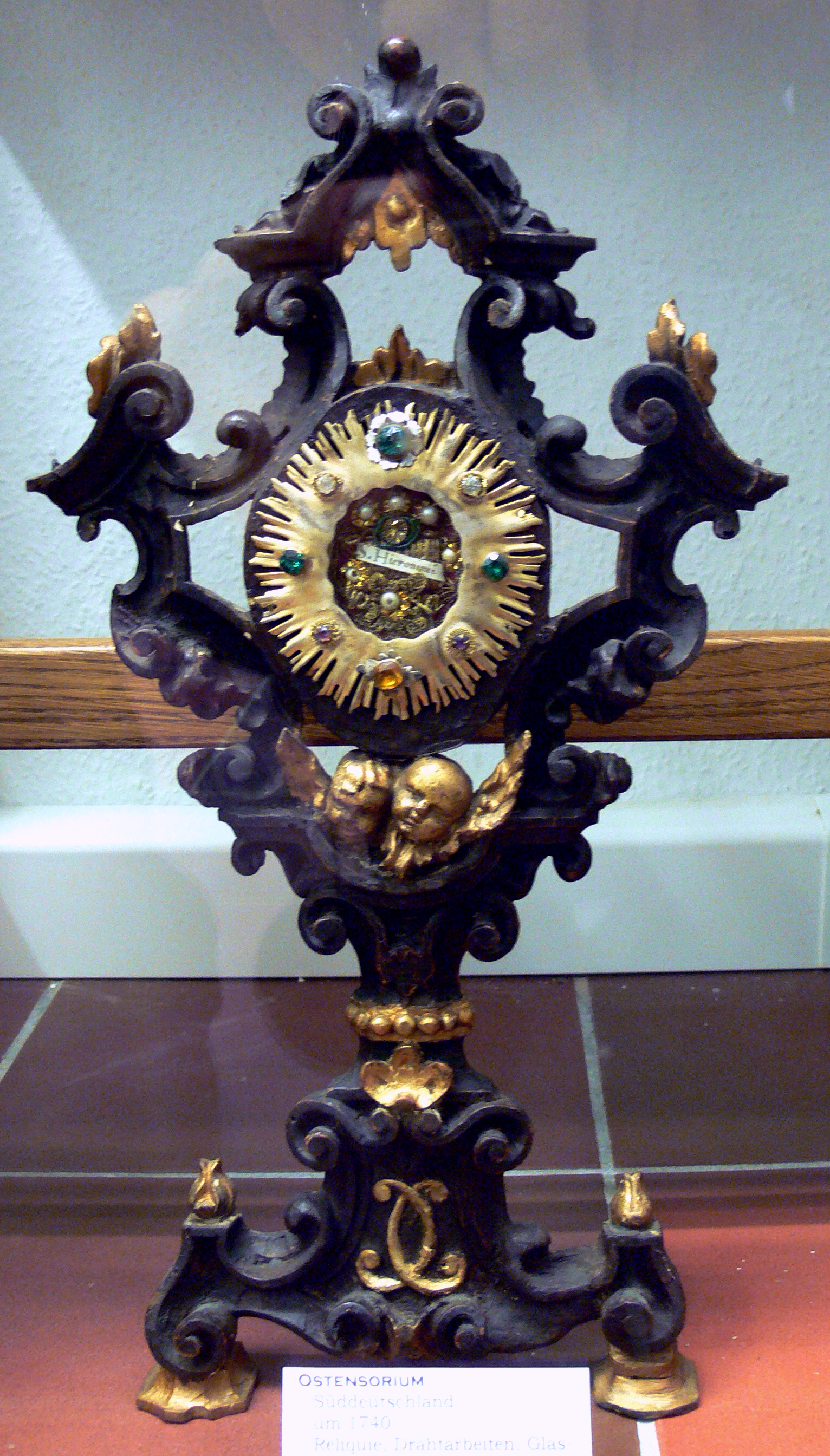
Ostensorium

In early 1789 members started the practice of Adoration of the Blessed Sacrament during the day before the closed tabernacle. A lay association was established, the members of which contributed a small sum of money for the expenses of the sanctuary entailed by perpetual adoration.

On 2 May, 1798, during the French invasion, the sisters were expelled and their monastery destroyed. Five years later, after the Concordat of Napoleon, the community returned. Acting on the advice of their confessor, Pierre Perro, the sisters, on 8 January 1846, began the practice of adoration by night as well as by day. In 1852 to signify their devotion to the Blessed Sacrament, they decided to wear a figure of an ostensorium on the breast of their habit.

In 1859 Empress Elizabeth of Austria presented the monastery with a chalice and a reliquary. A new church was opened in 1882, and is adorned with three paintings, representing the adoration of Christ. The convent at Einsiedeln is the only house of its kind having its own novitiate.

== Membership ==
In 1909 the community numbered 46 professed sisters and 5 novices.
