= Paolo Marraffa =

Italian writer, essayist and civil servant

- Born: November 23, 1993 (age 32); Lamezia Terme, Calabria, Italy
- Occupations: Writer, essayist, municipal official
- Known for: Sustainability and social innovation

Paolo Marraffa (Lamezia Terme, 23 November 1993) is an Italian writer, essayist and public official.

== Biography ==
Paolo Marraffa was born in Lamezia Terme, Calabria, Italy, where he completed his early education before pursuing advanced academic studies. He undertook specialized coursework in business organization, acquiring foundational expertise in corporate governance, strategic planning, and modern administrative structures. He subsequently earned a master's degree in marketing and communication from LUMSA University, focusing his postgraduate research on the evolution of public communication, digital media dynamics, and the integration of communication strategies within institutional frameworks.

Transitioning into the public sector, Marraffa established a career within public administration, taking on responsibilities as a municipal official in the Municipality of Catanzaro. Within this institutional capacity, his professional trajectory has intersected with key administrative initiatives, notably involving modernization processes, digital transition frameworks, and civic service development designed to enhance municipal operational efficiency and public engagement.

== Public activity ==
Marraffa's publications focus on sustainability, innovation, economic development and contemporary social challenges. In Il cambiamento possibile, he examines the impact of Industry 4.0, digital transformation and open innovation on society and organizations.

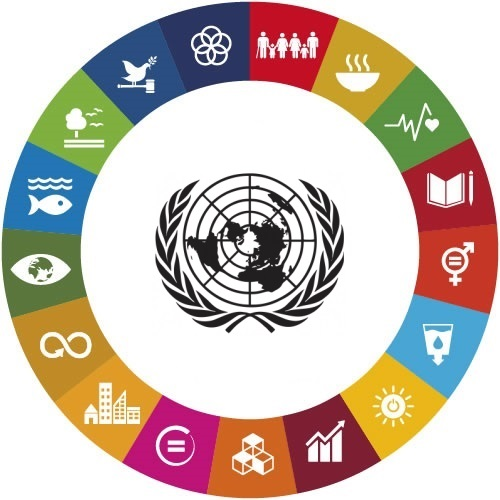

Together with journalist and science educator Dora Anna Rocca, he co-authored Verso la Society 5.0, a work examining the United Nations Sustainable Development Goals, environmental sustainability, technological change and the concept of Society 5.0. A review published by Edscuola described the book as an analysis of contemporary challenges including environmental sustainability, climate change, digital transformation and the future evolution of society.

Marraffa has participated in conferences, book presentations and public discussions dedicated to sustainability, innovation and civic development. His work has contributed to public debate on environmental responsibility, technological change and social development. In the years following the death of his grandmother, Maria Marino Marraffa, founder of the Movimento Apostolico, Marraffa became involved in initiatives aimed at preserving and documenting her spiritual and cultural legacy.

== Selected works ==
- Il cambiamento possibile
- Verso la Society 5.0
