= Augusto Lauro =

Italian Roman Catholic bishop (1923–2023)

His Excellency Augusto Lauro
- Bishop Emeritus of San Marco Argentano-Scalea
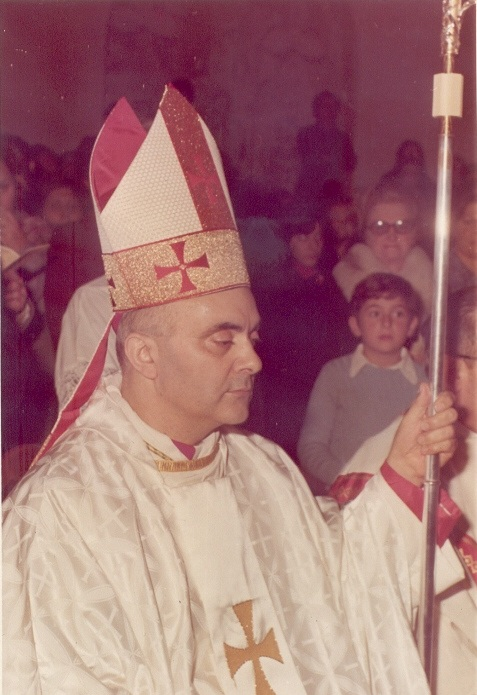
- Metropolis: Cosenza-Bisignano
- Appointed: 7 April 1979
- Term ended: 6 March 1999
- Predecessor: Luigi Rinaldi
- Successor: Domenico Crusco
- Previous posts: Auxiliary Bishop of Cosenza and Titular Bishop of Bigastro (1975–1979)

Orders
- Ordination: 29 June 1947 by Aniello Calcara
- Consecration: 28 October 1975 by Enea Selis

Personal details
- Born: 29 November 1923 Tarvisio, Italy
- Died: 7 March 2023 (aged 99) Cosenza, Italy

Augusto Lauro (29 November 1923 – 7 March 2023) was an Italian prelate of the Roman Catholic Church.

== Biography ==
Lauro was born in Tarvisio and was ordained a priest on 29 June 1947. Lauro was appointed Auxiliary bishop of the Diocese of Cosenza on 8 September 1975, as well as titular bishop of Bigastro, and ordained on 28 October 1975. Lauro was appointed bishop of the Diocese of San Marco Argentano-Scalea on 7 April 1979 where he remained until his retirement on 6 March 1999. He died in Cosenza on 7 March 2023, at the age of 99.

Catholic Church titles
| Preceded by Luigi Rinaldi | Bishop of San Marco Argentano-Scalea; 1979–1999 | Succeeded by Domenico Crusco |
| Preceded by — | Auxiliary Bishop of Cosenza; 1975–1979 | Succeeded by — |
| Preceded by Settimio Todisco | Titular Bishop of Bigastro; 1975–1979 | Succeeded by Alfonso Coto Monge |
