= Fabio Olivadisi =

Italian Roman Catholic bishop (1586–1656)

Most Reverend Fabio Olivadisi
- Bishop of Catanzaro
- Church: Catholic Church
- Diocese: Diocese of Catanzaro
- In office: 1646–1656
- Predecessor: Consalvo Caputo
- Successor: Filippo Visconti
- Previous posts: Bishop of Lavello (1626–1627); Bishop of Bova (1627–1646)

Orders
- Consecration: 30 November 1626 by Marcello Lante della Rovere

Personal details
- Born: 1586 Catanzaro, Italy
- Died: 10 November 1656 (age 70) Catanzaro, Italy

Fabio Olivadisi (1586 – 10 November 1656) was a Roman Catholic prelate who served as Bishop of Catanzaro (1646–1656), Bishop of Bova (1627–1646), and Bishop of Lavello (1626–1627).

== Biography ==
Fabio Olivadisi was born in Catanzaro, Italy in 1586. On 16 November 1626, he was appointed during the papacy of Pope Urban VIII as Bishop of Lavello. On 30 November 1626, he was consecrated bishop by Marcello Lante della Rovere, Cardinal-Priest of Santi Quirico e Giulitta, with Fabrizio Caracciolo Piscizi, Bishop of Catanzaro, and Giovanni Battista Altieri, Bishop of Camerino, serving as co-consecrators. On 20 September 1627, he was appointed during the papacy of Pope Urban VIII as Bishop of Bova. On 16 July 1646, he was appointed during the papacy of Pope Innocent X as Bishop of Catanzaro. He served as Bishop of Catanzaro until his death on 10 November 1656.

== Episcopal succession ==
While bishop, he was the principal co-consecrator of:

- Michele Angelo Vincentini, Bishop of Gerace (1650);
- Ferdinando Apicello, Bishop of Ruvo (1650);
- Lodovico Centofiorini, Bishop of Nicotera (1650); and
- Giovanni Francesco Ferrari, Bishop of Isola (1650).

== External links and additional sources ==
- Cheney, David M. "Diocese of Lavello". Catholic-Hierarchy.org. (Chronology of Bishops) ^{[self-published]}
- Chow, Gabriel. "Titular Episcopal See of Lavello". GCatholic.org. (Chronology of Bishops) ^{[self-published]}
- Cheney, David M. "Diocese of Bova". Catholic-Hierarchy.org. (for Chronology of Bishops) ^{[self-published]}
- Chow, Gabriel. "Diocese of Bova (Italy)". GCatholic.org. (for Chronology of Bishops) ^{[self-published]}
- Cheney, David M. "Archdiocese of Catanzaro-Squillace". Catholic-Hierarchy.org. (for Chronology of Bishops) ^{[self-published]}
- Chow, Gabriel. "Metropolitan Archdiocese of Catanzaro–Squillace (Italy)". GCatholic.org. (for Chronology of Bishops) ^{[self-published]}

Catholic Church titles
Preceded by Francesco Cereo de Mayda	Bishop of Lavello; 1626–1627	Succeeded by Placido Padiglia
Preceded by Nicola Maria Madaffari	Bishop of Bova; 1627–1646	Succeeded by Martino Megali
Preceded by Consalvo Caputo	Bishop of Catanzaro; 1646–1656	Succeeded by Filippo Visconti
