= Bernardino d'Aragona =

Most Reverend Bernardino d'Aragona
- Bishop of Bova
- Church: Catholic Church
- Diocese: Diocese of Bova
- In office: 1657–1669
- Predecessor: Martino Megali
- Successor: Marco Antonio Contestabile

Orders
- Consecration: 11 March 1657 by Bernardino Spada

Personal details
- Born: 1611 Carpanzano, Italy
- Died: 12 July 1669 (age 58) Bova, Italy

Bernardino d'Aragona(1611–1664) was a Roman Catholic prelate who served as Bishop of Bova (1657–1669).

== Biography ==
Bernardino d'Aragona was born in Carpanzano, Italy on 19 February 1657. On 19 February 1657, he was appointed during the papacy of Pope Alexander VII as Bishop of Bova. On 11 March 1657, he was consecrated bishop by Bernardino Spada, Cardinal-Bishop of Palestrina. He served as Bishop of Bova until his death on 12 July 1669.

== External links and additional sources ==
- Cheney, David M. "Diocese of Bova". Catholic-Hierarchy.org. (for Chronology of Bishops) ^{[self-published]}
- Chow, Gabriel. "Diocese of Bova (Italy)". GCatholic.org. (for Chronology of Bishops) ^{[self-published]}

Catholic Church titles
Preceded by Martino Megali	Bishop of Bova; 1657–1664	Succeeded by Marco Antonio Contestabile
