= Salesian Oblates of the Sacred Heart of Jesus =

Salesian Oblates of the Sacred Heart of Jesus (in Italian Salesiane Oblate del Sacro Cuore di Gesù with the abbreviation S.O.S.C.) is an institute of religious sisters of pontifical right of Italian origin founded by Salesian Bishop Mgr. Giuseppe Cognata in 1933 at Bova Marina, Italy. The institute belongs to the Salesian Family.

== History ==
The institute was founded on 8 December 1933, in Bova Marina by Mgr. Cognata, Bishop of the Dioceses of Bova (1933–1940). It was approved as institute of pontifical right on 16 January 1962, and it was recognized by the Italian state on 26 December 1962. The Holy See gave to it the decree of praise on 24 January 1972; and it formally joined the Salesian family on 24 December 1983.

== Activities and expansion ==
The Salesian Oblates are dedicated to Christian education of the youth: they have kindergartens, schools, youth centres (oratories) and pastoral centers.

Besides Italy, their original country, they have communities in Bolivia and Peru.

== Bibliography ==
- Annuario Pontificio per l'anno 2007, Libreria Editrice Vaticana, Città del Vaticano 2007. ISBN 978-88-209-7908-9.
- Guerrino Pelliccia e Giancarlo Rocca (curr.), Dizionario degli Istituti di Perfezione (10 voll.), Edizioni paoline, Milan 1974–2003.
