= Consalvo Caputo =

Italian Roman Catholic prelate

Most Reverend Consalvo Caputo
- Bishop of Catanzaro
- Church: Catholic Church
- Diocese: Diocese of Catanzaro
- In office: 1633–1645
- Predecessor: Luca Castellini
- Successor: Fabio Olivadisi
- Previous post: Bishop of San Marco (1630–1633)

Orders
- Consecration: 24 February 1630 by Luigi Caetani

Personal details
- Born: 12 March 1598 Naples, Italy
- Died: 19 November 1645 (age 47) Catanzaro, Italy

Consalvo Caputo (12 March 1598 – 19 November 1645) was a Roman Catholic prelate who served as Bishop of Catanzaro (1633–1645) and Bishop of San Marco (1630–1633).

== Biography ==
Consalvo Caputo was born in Naples, Italy, on 12 March 1598. On 18 February 1630, he was appointed during the papacy of Pope Urban VIII as Bishop of San Marco. On 24 February 1630, he was consecrated bishop by Luigi Caetani, Cardinal-Priest of Santa Pudenziana, with Giulio Antonio Santoro, Archbishop of Cosenza, Antonio Ricciulli, Bishop Emeritus of Belcastro, serving as co-consecrators. On 8 August 1633, he was appointed during the papacy of Pope Urban VIII as Bishop of Catanzaro. He served as Bishop of Catanzaro until his death on 19 November 1645.

== External links and additional sources ==
Catholic Church titles
Preceded by Giovanni Battista Indelli	Bishop of San Marco; 1630–1633	Succeeded by Defendente Brusati
Preceded by Luca Castellini	Bishop of Catanzaro; 1633–1645	Succeeded by Fabio Olivadisi
