= Giovanni Battista Pontano =

Roman Catholic bishop

Most Reverend Giovanni Battista Pontano
- Bishop of Oppido Mamertina
- Church: Catholic Church
- Diocese: Diocese of Oppido Mamertina
- Predecessor: Fabrizio Caracciolo Piscizi
- Successor: Paolo Diano-Parisi

Orders
- Ordination: 20 September 1608
- Consecration: 25 January 1632 by Antonio Marcello Barberini

Personal details
- Died: May 1662 Oppido Mamertina, Italy

Giovanni Battista Pontano or Giovanni Battista Montano (died 1662) was a Roman Catholic prelate who served as Bishop of Oppido Mamertina (1632–1662).

== Biography ==
Giovanni Battista Pontano was ordained a priest on 20 September 1608. On 19 January 1632, he was appointed during the papacy of Pope Urban VIII as Bishop of Oppido Mamertina. On 25 January 1632, he was consecrated bishop by Antonio Marcello Barberini, Cardinal-Priest of Sant'Onofrio, with Antonio Provana, Archbishop of Turin, and Giovanni Francesco Passionei, Bishop of Cagli, serving as co-consecrators. He served as Bishop of Oppido Mamertina until his death in May 1662.

== External links and additional sources ==
- Cheney, David M. "Diocese of Oppido Mamertina-Palmi". Catholic-Hierarchy.org. (for Chronology of Bishops) ^{[self-published]}
- Chow, Gabriel. "Diocese of Oppido Mamertina-Palmi (Italy)". GCatholic.org. (for Chronology of Bishops) ^{[self-published]}

Catholic Church titles
Preceded by Fabrizio Caracciolo Piscizi	Bishop of Oppido Mamertina; 1632–1662	Succeeded by Paolo Diano-Parisi
