= Carlo Sgombrino =

Italian Roman Catholic prelate (1619–1686)

Most Reverend Carlo Sgombrino
- Bishop of Catanzaro
- Church: Catholic Church
- Diocese: Diocese of Catanzaro
- In office: 1672–1686
- Predecessor: Agazio di Somma
- Successor: Francesco Gori
- Previous post: Bishop of Belcastro (1652–1672)

Orders
- Consecration: 29 December 1652 by Marcantonio Franciotti

Personal details
- Born: 1619 Airola, Italy
- Died: October 1686 (age 67) Catanzaro, Italy

Carlo Sgombrino (1619 – October 1686) was a Roman Catholic prelate who served as Bishop of Catanzaro (1672–1686) and Bishop of Belcastro (1652–1672).

== Biography ==
Carlo Sgombrino was born in 1619 in Airola, Italy. On 11 December 1652, he was appointed during the papacy of Pope Innocent X as Bishop of Belcastro. On 29 December 1652, he was consecrated bishop by Marcantonio Franciotti, Cardinal-Priest of Santa Maria della Pace, with Ranuccio Scotti Douglas, Bishop Emeritus of Borgo San Donnino, serving as co-consecrator. On 8 February 1672, he was appointed during the papacy of Pope Clement X as Bishop of Catanzaro. He served as Bishop of Catanzaro until his death in October 1686.

== External links and additional sources ==
- Cheney, David M. "Diocese of Belcastro". Catholic-Hierarchy.org. (for Chronology of Bishops) ^{[self-published]}
- Chow, Gabriel. "Titular Episcopal See of Belcastro (Italy)". GCatholic.org. (for Chronology of Bishops) ^{[self-published]}
- Cheney, David M. "Archdiocese of Catanzaro-Squillace". Catholic-Hierarchy.org. (for Chronology of Bishops) ^{[self-published]}
- Chow, Gabriel. "Metropolitan Archdiocese of Catanzaro–Squillace (Italy)". GCatholic.org. (for Chronology of Bishops) ^{[self-published]}

Catholic Church titles
Preceded by Francesco Clerico	Bishop of Belcastro; 1652–1672	Succeeded by Carlo Galgano
Preceded by Agazio di Somma	Bishop of Catanzaro; 1672–1686	Succeeded by Francesco Gori
