= Sebastiano Delli Frangi =

Most Reverend Sebastiano Delli Frangi
- Bishop of Cariati e Cerenzia
- Church: Catholic Church
- Diocese: Diocese of Cariati e Cerenzia
- In office: 1688–1714
- Predecessor: Girolamo Barzellini
- Successor: Bartolomeo Porzio

Orders
- Consecration: 22 August 1688 by Savo Millini

Personal details
- Born: 22 August 1634 Palma, Italy
- Died: October 1714 (age 80)

Sebastiano Delli Frangi (22 August 1634 – October 1714) was a Roman Catholic prelate who served as Bishop of Cariati e Cerenzia (1688–1714).

== Biography ==
Sebastiano Delli Frangi was born in Palma, Italy on 22 August 1634. On 9 August 1688, he was appointed during the papacy of Pope Innocent XI as Bishop of Cariati e Cerenzia. On 22 August 1688, he was consecrated bishop by Savo Millini, Bishop of Orvieto, with Pietro Francesco Orsini de Gravina, Archbishop of Benevento, and Gianfrancesco Riccamonti, Bishop of Cervia, serving as co-consecrators. He served as Bishop of Cariati e Cerenzia until his death in October 1714.

== External links and additional sources ==
- Cheney, David M. "Diocese of Cariati". Catholic-Hierarchy.org. (for Chronology of Bishops) ^{[self-published]}
- Chow, Gabriel. "Diocese of Cariati (Italy)". GCatholic.org. (for Chronology of Bishops) ^{[self-published]}

Catholic Church titles
Preceded by Girolamo Barzellini	Bishop of Cariati e Cerenzia; 1688–1714	Succeeded by Bartolomeo Porzio
