= Girolamo Barzellini =

Italian Roman Catholic prelate

Most Reverend Girolamo Barzellini
- Bishop of Cariati e Cerenzia
- Church: Catholic Church
- Diocese: Diocese of Cariati
- In office: 1664–1688
- Predecessor: Agazio di Somma
- Successor: Sebastiano Delli Frangi

Personal details
- Died: 8 April 1688

Girolamo Barzellini (died 8 April 1688) was a Roman Catholic prelate who served as Bishop of Cariati e Cerenzia (1664–1688).

== Biography ==
On 21 July 1664, Girolamo Barzellini was appointed during the papacy of Pope Alexander VII as Bishop of Cariati e Cerenzia. He served as Bishop of Cariati e Cerenzia until his death on 8 April 1688.

== Episcopal succession ==
While bishop, he was the principal co-consecrator of:

- Lorenzo Mayers Caramuel, Bishop of Castellammare di Stabia (1676);
- Antonio del Río Colmenares, Bishop of Gaeta (1676);
- Domenico Antonio Bernardini, Bishop of Castellaneta (1677); and
- Giacomo Santoro, Bishop of Bitetto (1677).

== External links and additional sources ==
- Cheney, David M. "Diocese of Cariati". Catholic-Hierarchy.org. (for Chronology of Bishops) ^{[self-published]}
- Chow, Gabriel. "Diocese of Cariati (Italy)". GCatholic.org. (for Chronology of Bishops) ^{[self-published]}

Catholic Church titles
Preceded by Agazio di Somma	Bishop of Cariati e Cerenzia; 1664–1688	Succeeded by Sebastiano Delli Frangi
