= Agazio di Somma =

Italian prelate and writer

Most Reverend Agazio di Somma
- Bishop of Catanzaro
- Church: Catholic Church
- Diocese: Diocese of Catanzaro
- In office: 1664–1671
- Predecessor: Filippo Visconti
- Successor: Carlo Sgombrino
- Previous post: Bishop of Cariati e Cerenzia (1659–1664)

Orders
- Consecration: 26 January 1659 by Marcantonio Franciotti

Personal details
- Born: 1591 Simeri, Italy
- Died: 1 October 1671 (age 80) Catanzaro, Italy

Agazio di Somma (1591 – 1 October 1671) was a Roman Catholic prelate and Baroque writer who served as Bishop of Catanzaro (1664–1671) and Bishop of Cariati e Cerenzia (1659–1664).

== Biography ==
Agazio di Somma was born in Simeri, Italy in 1591. On 13 January 1659, he was appointed during the papacy of Pope Alexander VII as Bishop of Cariati e Cerenzia. On 26 January 1659, he was consecrated bishop by Marcantonio Franciotti, Cardinal-Priest of Santa Maria della Pace. On 28 April 1664, he was appointed during the papacy of Pope Alexander VII as Bishop of Catanzaro. He served as Bishop of Catanzaro until his death on 1 October 1671.

== Works ==
Agazio di Somma was a prolific writer. He published a chronicle of earthquakes in Calabria during 1638-1641, titled Istorico racconto de' terremoti della Calabria dal 1638 al 1641 (Naples, 1641) and an Italian life of saint Pius V, translated into French by André Félibien in 1672. In a discourse before the Accademia degli Umoristi, he proclaimed that Giambattista Marino's Adone surpassed its model, Torquato Tasso's Jerusalem Delivered. Ironically, two of Marino's staunchest disciples, Girolamo Preti and Antonio Bruni, were the first to denounce the possibility that the Adone might rank superior to the Gerusalemme. The episode annoyed Marino and embittered him against his friends.

== List of works ==
- Agazio di Somma, I due primi canti dell'America, Poema heroico, Rome: Bartolomeo Zannetti, 1624.
- Agazio di Somma (1641). Historico racconto de i terremoti della Calabria dall'anno 1638. fin'anno 1641. Composto dal sig. Agatio di Somma. Naples: appresso Camillo Cauallo.
- Agazio di Somma, L'arte del viver felice, ovvero Le tre giornate di oro. Messina : Giacomo Mattei, 1649 (2nd edit. Naples: Gio. Alberto Tarini, 1654).
- Agazio di Somma, La vie du pape Pie V, translated by André Félibien; Paris : J.B. Coignard, 1672 (on-line).
- Agazio di Somma, Dell'origine dell'anno santo. Pietro De Leo (ed.). Collana Biblioteca di storia e cultura meridionale. Soveria Mannelli: Rubbettino Editore, 2000, ISBN 8849800568 ().

== External links and additional sources ==
- Foà, Simona (1991). "DI SOMMA, Agazio". Dizionario Biografico degli Italiani (in Italian). Vol. 40: Di Fausto–Donadoni. Rome: Istituto dell'Enciclopedia Italiana. ISBN 978-88-12-00032-6.
- Cheney, David M. "Diocese of Cariati". Catholic-Hierarchy.org. (for Chronology of Bishops) ^{[self-published]}
- Chow, Gabriel. "Diocese of Cariati (Italy)". GCatholic.org. (for Chronology of Bishops) ^{[self-published]}
- Cheney, David M. "Archdiocese of Catanzaro-Squillace". Catholic-Hierarchy.org. (for Chronology of Bishops) ^{[self-published]}
- Chow, Gabriel. "Metropolitan Archdiocese of Catanzaro–Squillace (Italy)". GCatholic.org. (for Chronology of Bishops) ^{[self-published]}

Catholic Church titles
Preceded by Francesco Gonzaga	Bishop of Cariati e Cerenzia; 1659–1671	Succeeded by Girolamo Barzellini
Preceded by Filippo Visconti	Bishop of Catanzaro; 1664–1671	Succeeded by Carlo Sgombrino
