= Luca Castellini =

Most Reverend Luca Castellini
- Bishop of Catanzaro
- Church: Catholic Church
- Diocese: Diocese of Catanzaro
- In office: 1629–1631
- Predecessor: Fabrizio Caracciolo Piscizi
- Successor: Consalvo Caputo

Orders
- Consecration: 25 November 1629 by Antonio Marcello Barberini

Personal details
- Died: 1631 Catanzaro, Italy

Luca Castellini, O.P. or Lucas Castellini (died 1631) was a Roman Catholic prelate who served as Bishop of Catanzaro (1629–1631).

== Biography ==
Luca Castellini was ordained a priest in the Order of Preachers. A competent theologian, he was elected Procurator of the Dominican Order, and then, in 1611, Vicar General.

On 19 November 1629, he was appointed by Pope Urban VIII as Bishop of Catanzaro. On 25 November 1629, he was consecrated bishop by Antonio Marcello Barberini, Cardinal-Priest of Sant'Onofrio.

He served as Bishop of Catanzaro for only fourteen months, until his death in 1631.

While bishop he was the principal co-consecrator of Marcantonio Bragadin (cardinal), Bishop of Crema (1629).

He was the author of De electione et confirmatione canonica praelatorum, and De canonizatione sanctorum: Tractatus de miraculis.

== External links and additional sources ==
Catholic Church titles
Preceded by Fabrizio Caracciolo Piscizi	Bishop of Catanzaro; 1629–1631	Succeeded by Consalvo Caputo
