= Martino Megali =

17th-century Roman Catholic bishop

Most Reverend Martino Megali
- Bishop of Bova
- Church: Catholic Church
- Diocese: Diocese of Bova
- In office: 1646–1656
- Predecessor: Fabio Olivadisi
- Successor: Bernardino d'Aragona

Orders
- Consecration: 23 September 1646 by Pier Luigi Carafa (seniore)

Personal details
- Born: date unknown San Mauro Marchesato, Italy
- Died: July 1656 Amalfi, Italy

Martino Megali (died 1656) was a Roman Catholic prelate who served as Bishop of Bova (1646–1656).

== Biography ==
Martino Megali was born in San Mauro Marchesato, Italy. On 10 September 1646, Martino Megali was appointed during the papacy of Pope Innocent X as Bishop of Bova. On 23 September 1646, he was consecrated bishop by Pier Luigi Carafa (seniore), Cardinal-Priest of Santi Silvestro e Martino ai Monti, with Alfonso Sacrati, Bishop Emeritus of Comacchio, and Ranuccio Scotti Douglas, Bishop of Borgo San Donnino, serving as co-consecrators. He served as Bishop of Bova until his death in July 1656.

== External links and additional sources ==
- Cheney, David M. "Diocese of Bova". Catholic-Hierarchy.org. (for Chronology of Bishops) ^{[self-published]}
- Chow, Gabriel. "Diocese of Bova (Italy)". GCatholic.org. (for Chronology of Bishops) ^{[self-published]}

Catholic Church titles
Preceded by Fabio Olivadisi	Bishop of Bova; 1646–1656	Succeeded by Bernardino d'Aragona
