= Francesco Dentice =

16th-century Roman Catholic priest

Most Reverend Francesco Dentice
- Bishop-elect of Cariati e Cerenzia
- Church: Catholic Church
- Diocese: Diocese of Cariati
- Predecessor: Girolamo Candido
- Successor: Martino de Lignano

Personal details
- Died: 1505

Francesco Dentice (died 1505) was a Roman Catholic prelate who served as Bishop-elect of Cariati e Cerenzia (1504–1505).

== Biography ==
On 7 Mar 1504, Francesco Dentice was appointed during the papacy of Pope Julius II as Bishop of Cariati e Cerenzia. He died in 1505 before he was consecrated.

== External links and additional sources ==
- Cheney, David M. "Diocese of Cariati". Catholic-Hierarchy.org. (for Chronology of Bishops) ^{[self-published]}
- Chow, Gabriel. "Diocese of Cariati (Italy)". GCatholic.org. (for Chronology of Bishops) ^{[self-published]}

Catholic Church titles
Preceded by Girolamo Candido	Bishop-elect of Cariati e Cerenzia; 1504–1505	Succeeded by Martino de Lignano
