= Fabrizio Caracciolo Piscizi =

Italian prelate

Most Reverend Fabrizio Caracciolo Piscizi
- Bishop of Oppido Mamertina
- Church: Catholic Church
- Diocese: Diocese of Oppido Mamertina
- In office: 1630–1631
- Predecessor: Antonio Cesonio
- Successor: Giovanni Battista Pontano
- Previous posts: Apostolic Collector to Portugal (1604–1609); Bishop of Catanzaro (1609–1629)

Orders
- Consecration: February 1619 by Decio Carafa

Personal details
- Born: 1583 Naples, Italy
- Died: 1631 (age 48) Oppido Mamertina, Italy

Fabrizio Caracciolo Piscizi or Modernus Caracciolo Piscizi (1583–1631) was a Roman Catholic prelate who served as Bishop of Oppido Mamertina (1630–1631), Bishop of Catanzaro (1609–1629), and Apostolic Collector to Portugal (1604–1609).

== Biography ==
Fabrizio Caracciolo Piscizi was born in Naples, Italy in 1583. On 22 December 1604, he was appointed during the papacy of Pope Clement VIII as Apostolic Collector to Portugal. He resigned as Apostolic Collector to Portugal on 30 January 1609. On 7 January 1619, he was appointed during the papacy of Pope Paul V as Bishop of Catanzaro. In February 1619, he was consecrated bishop by Decio Carafa, Archbishop of Naples. He resigned as Bishop of Catanzaro on 7 November 1629. On 28 January 1630, he was appointed during the papacy of Pope Urban VIII as Bishop of Oppido Mamertina. He served as Bishop of Catanzaro until his death in 1631.

While bishop, he was the principal co-consecrator of Fabio Olivadisi, Bishop of Lavello (1626); and Gerolamo Cappello, Bishop of Termoli (1626).

== External links and additional sources ==
- Cheney, David M. "Nunciature to Portugal". Catholic-Hierarchy.org. (for Chronology of Bishops) ^{[self-published]}
- Cheney, David M. "Archdiocese of Catanzaro-Squillace". Catholic-Hierarchy.org. (for Chronology of Bishops) ^{[self-published]}
- Chow, Gabriel. "Metropolitan Archdiocese of Catanzaro–Squillace (Italy)". GCatholic.org. (for Chronology of Bishops) ^{[self-published]}
- Cheney, David M. "Diocese of Oppido Mamertina-Palmi". Catholic-Hierarchy.org. (for Chronology of Bishops) ^{[self-published]}
- Chow, Gabriel. "Diocese of Oppido Mamertina-Palmi (Italy)". GCatholic.org. (for Chronology of Bishops) ^{[self-published]}

Catholic Church titles
Preceded by Decio Carafa	Apostolic Collector to Portugal; 1630–1631	Succeeded by Gaspare Paluzzi degli Albertoni
Preceded by Giuseppe Pisculli	Bishop of Catanzaro; 1609–1629	Succeeded by Luca Castellini
Preceded by Antonio Cesonio	Bishop of Oppido Mamertina; 1630–1631	Succeeded by Giovanni Battista Pontano
