= Vincenzo Bertolone =

Italian archbishop

The Most Reverend Vincenzo Bertolone S.d.P.
- Archbishop emeritus of Catanzaro-Squillace
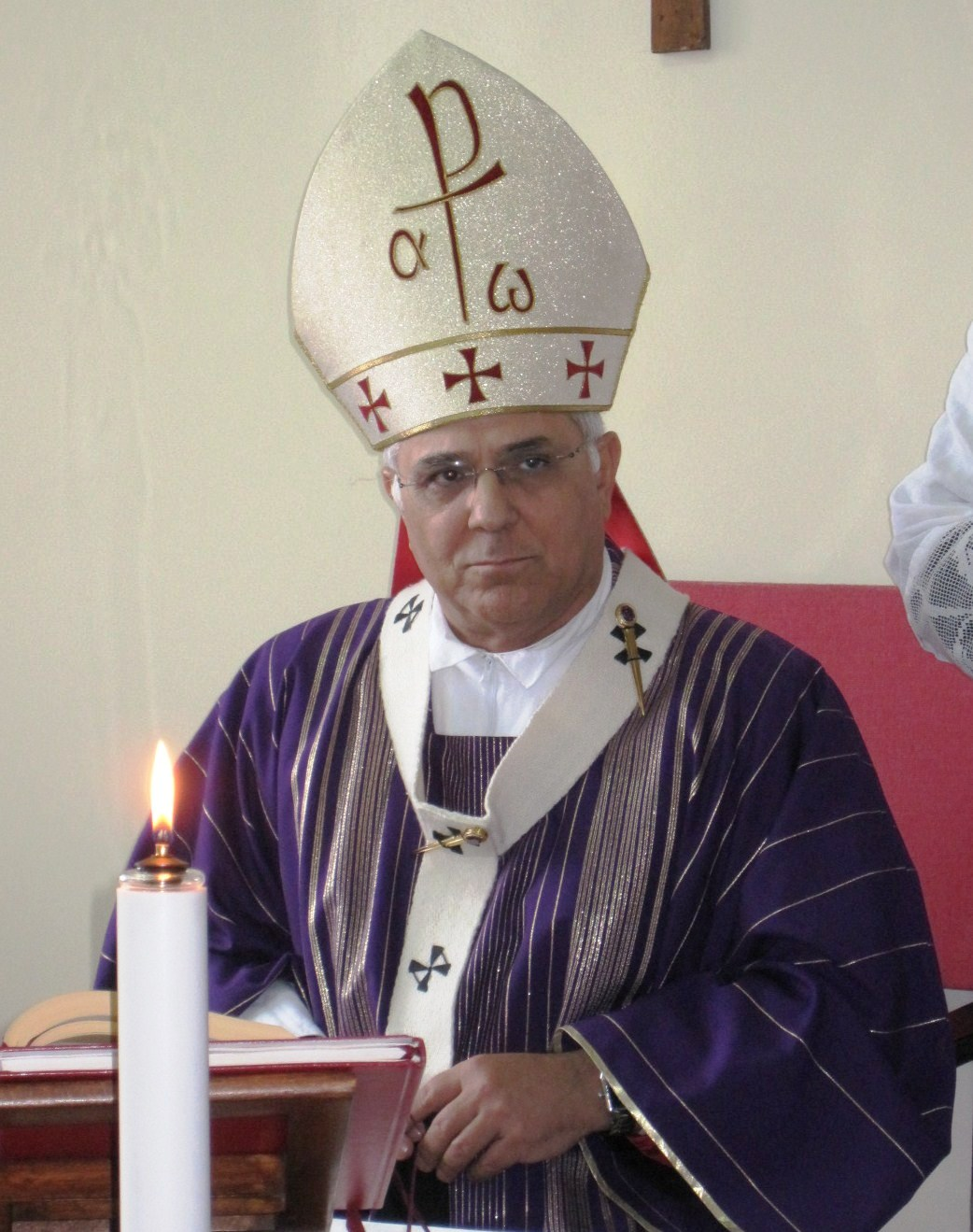
- Bertolone in 2011
- Church: Roman Catholic Church
- Archdiocese: Catanzaro-Squillace
- See: Catanzaro-Squillace
- Appointed: 25 March 2011
- Installed: 29 May 2011
- Term ended: 15 September 2021
- Predecessor: Antonio Ciliberti
- Successor: Claudio Maniago
- Previous posts: Secretary of the Congregation for Institutes of Consecrated Life and Societies of Apostolic Life (2004-07); Bishop of Cassano all'Jonio (2007–11)

Orders
- Ordination: 17 May 1975
- Consecration: 3 May 2007 by Tarcisio Bertone S.D.B.

Personal details
- Born: Vincenzo Bertolone; 17 November 1946 (age 79) San Biagio Platani, Italy
- Denomination: Catholic (Latin Rite)
- Education: University of Palermo; Pontifical University of Saint Thomas Aquinas
- Motto: Humiliter in Lumine Vultus Tui
- Coat of arms

Vincenzo Bertolone S.d.P. (born 17 November 1946) is an Italian prelate of the Catholic Church who was the archbishop of the Archdiocese of Catanzaro-Squillace from 2011 to 2021. He was previously the bishop of the Diocese of Cassano all'Jonio. He has also written and published a number of books on religious topics.

== Early life ==
Bertolone was born in San Biagio Platani province as well as the archdiocese of Agrigento. He obtained his master's degree in 1972 and received his bachelor's degree in theology from the "San Giovanni Evangelista" Theological Institute in Palermo in 1974.

== Priestly ministry ==
He was ordained a priest in Palermo on 17 May 1975 as a member of the order of the Missionary Servants of the Poor. He graduated in pedagogy from the University of Palermo in 1981, and obtained his license in Canon Law at the "Angelicum" in Rome in 1985. In the same year he received the Postulator certificate from the Congregation for the Causes of Saints and, in 1987, he obtained his doctorate in Canon Law.

Bertolone was a teacher of the subject of religion in the state secondary schools of Palermo from 1972 to 1984 and was a chaplain at the "Malaspina" Re-education Institute for troubled minors in Palermo from 1975 to 1980. From 1975 to 1983 he was the treasurer of the Palermo Educational Institute, and would serve as general treasurer from 1976 to 1989 and general councilor from 1976 2006. He was a parish collaborator of "S. Maria della Perseveranza" in Rome from 1983 to 1987, and also in Rome worked as a teacher in a school run by the Ursuline Sisters in 1985 to 1986. In 1988 he became an official of the Congregation for institutes of consecrated life and societies of apostolic life, of which he was appointed undersecretary by Pope John Paul II on 12 June 2004.

== Bishop of Cassano all'Jonio ==
On 10 March 2007, it was announced that Bertolone had been appointed by Pope Benedict XVI as the new bishop of the diocese of Cassano all'Jonio in Calabria. Bertolone was ordained a bishop on 3 May 2007 by Cardinal Tarcisio Bertone S.B.D., with Cardinal Franc Rode and Archbishop Vittorio Luigi Mondello in Rome. He was formally installed as bishop 10 days later on 13 May 2007.

== Archbishop of Catanzaro-Squillace ==
On 25 March 2011, it was announced that Bertolone had been appointed by Pope Benedict XVI as the new archbishop of Catanzaro-Squillace, replacing the retiring Antonio Ciliberti. He was formally installed as archbishop on 29 May 2011. On 3 September 2015 he was elected president of the Calabrian Episcopal Conference.

Bertolone has historically been a strong critic of Sicilian Mafia and 'Ndrangheta, calling them anti-Christian and anti-Gospel, and was one of the stronger advocates for the beatification of Pino Puglisi (an Italian priest killed by the mafia in the 1990s).

Pope Francis accepted his resignation on 15 September 2021, two months in advance of his 75th birthday, the usual retirement date.

== Publications ==
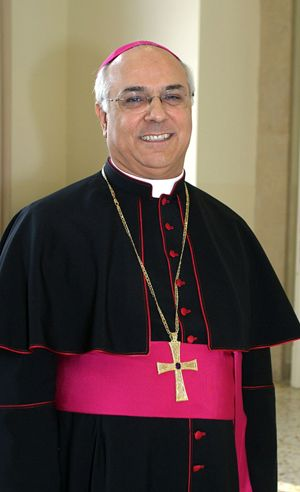
Bertolone in 2013

- La Salus animarum nell’ordinamento giuridico della Chiesa, 1987
- Volto Redentore, Le sette lampade, 1997
- E il mandorlo fiorì, 1999
- I sette doni della grazia, 2000
- I tre compagni di viaggio, 2001
- Francesco Spoto. Il martire del sorriso, Elledici, 2007.
- Sulle orme del divino viandante. Riflessioni sulla vita consacrata, Elledici, 2007.
- Perché, perché Signore? Non sei colpa tu, o Signore..., Edizioni San Paolo, 2010.
- La sapienza del sorriso. Il martirio di don Giuseppe Puglisi, Paoline, 2012.
- Padre Pino Puglisi beato. Profeta e martire, Edizioni San Paolo, 2013.
- I care humanum - Passare la fiaccola della nuova umanità, Paoline, 2014.
- Perfectae caritatis, cinquan'anni dopo. Né estranei agli uomini, né inutili nella città, Edizioni San Paolo, 2015.
- Il grano e la zizzania, Rubbettino, 2017.
- Gesù: eterno giovane tra i giovani, Rubbettino, 2018.
- Scomunica ai mafiosi? Contributi per un dibattito, Rubbettino, 2018.
