= Girolamo Candido =

Most Reverend Girolamo Candido
- Bishop of Cariati e Cerenzia
- Church: Catholic Church
- Diocese: Diocese of Cariati
- In office: 1500–1504
- Successor: Francesco Dentice

Personal details
- Died: 1504

Girolamo Candido, O.F.M. (died 1504) was a Roman Catholic prelate who served as Bishop of Cariati e Cerenzia (1500–1504).

== Biography ==
Girolamo Candido was ordained a priest in the Order of Friars Minor. On 20 Nov 1500, he was appointed during the papacy of Pope Alexander VI as Bishop of Cariati e Cerenzia. He served as Bishop of Cariati e Cerenzia until his death on 1504.

== See also ==
- Catholic Church in Italy

== External links and additional sources ==
- Cheney, David M. "Diocese of Cariati". Catholic-Hierarchy.org. (for Chronology of Bishops) ^{[self-published]}
- Chow, Gabriel. "Diocese of Cariati (Italy)". GCatholic.org. (for Chronology of Bishops) ^{[self-published]}

Catholic Church titles
Preceded by	Bishop of Cariati e Cerenzia; 1500–1504	Succeeded by Francesco Dentice
