= Giuseppe Cognata =

Catholic bishop

Most Reverend Giuseppe Cognata, SDB
- Bishop of Bova
- Church: Catholic Church
- Diocese: Diocese of Bova
- In office: 1933–1940
- Predecessor: Andrea Taccone
- Successor: Enrico Montalbetti, Obs. S.C.

Orders
- Ordination: 29 August 1909
- Consecration: 23 March 1933 by Ven. Card. Augusto Hlond, Metropolitan Archbishop of Gniezno and Poznań (Poland.)

Personal details
- Born: 14 October 1885 Agrigento, Italy
- Died: 21 July 1972 (aged 86) Pellaro, Italy
- Denomination: Roman Catholic

Giuseppe Cognata (Agrigento, 14 October 1885 - Pellaro, 22 July 1972) was an Italian Catholic bishop and member of the Salesians of Don Bosco. He was the founder of the Salesian Oblates of the Sacred Heart of Jesus, a female religious institute of pontifical right. Due to accusations that were proved false many years after, the Congregation for the Doctrine of the Faith condemned Mgr. Cognata to be dismissed of his condition of Bishop on 20 December 1939. Monsignor Giuseppe Cognata in Easter 1962 was reinstated by Pope John XXIII in the Episcopate, after the true came out. The Congregation for the Doctrine of the Faith announced on 17 February 2020 that Pope Francis has given consent to open the Cause of Beatification of Mons. Giuseppe Cognata, S.D.B.

== Life ==
Giuseppe Cognata was born in Agrigento on 14 October 1885 in an important family of his region with great Catholic tradition, especially from his mother.

=== Priesthood ===
At 12 years old, Giuseppe entered the Saint Basil Salesian School of Randazzo in Sicily and also applied for a vocational following as a priest among the order of Don Bosco, among a bitter opposition from his father and grandfather. He made perpetual profession as a religious man on 5 May 1908 in Saint Gregory of Catania in front of the Rector Major of the Salesians, Blessed Michael Rua. The following year, on 29 August 1909, he received priestly ordination in Acireale. He had already successfully achieved a double degree in literature and philosophy and therefore began to work as a professor and assistant. From Sicily, he was then transferred to other Salesian houses in the Veneto and Marche regions.

During the First World War, as many religious young men, Giuseppe was recruited as a soldier in Palermo, Trapani, Padua and precisely in Trapani in a military guise, where he laid the first foundations of the Salesian work which he was called to direct a few years later, after the war. He distinguished himself in various apostolic activities, becoming "all things to all", always tireless, ready for every instance, always mild and smiling. He raised a church dedicated to Mary Help of Christians almost out of nowhere, dedicated himself with zeal and commitment to the school and the oratory (youth centre). From Trapani he was then called to direct the college of Randazzo, then that of Gualdo Tadino in Umbria, and finally he was director of the "Sacro Cuore" in Rome, where today is the Main Salesian headquarters.

=== Bishop ===
On 16 March 1933 Pope Pius XI appointed him bishop of Bova, a particularly poor and disadvantaged Calabrian diocese: a real "mission" on Italian soil, on a human, civil, cultural, religious and spiritual level. It was in fact made up mainly of small towns, lost in the mountains, devoid of roads, water, bread, school and priests. Now the diocese is united in perpetuity with that of Reggio Calabria. He received episcopal ordination the following 23 April in the basilica of the Sacred Heart in via Marsala in Rome from Cardinal August Hlond, metropolitan archbishop of Gniezno and Poznań, co-consecrating the bishop of Sutri and Nepi Luigi Maria Olivares and the titular bishop of Farsalo and auxiliary of Palermo Romolo Genuardi.

Through steep paths and mule tracks, Monsignor Cognata, who had chosen the Pauline expression "Caritas Christi, urget nos" as his episcopal motto, wanted in perfect missionary style to visit and comfort not only all the villages of the diocese, but also groups of poor families. scattered here and there in the most remote and inaccessible places, in the mountains of Bova or in the valleys of Amendolea. He committed himself on the purely human and social field but above all he worked on the spiritual level with courage and charity, with trust in the unfailing help of Providence.

Man of faith and prayer, open to the breath of the Spirit of God, he created a pious society of generous young women, willing to work with courage and joy, in the smallest, most remote, most abandoned centres. Thus was born the Congregation of the Oblate Salesian Sisters of the Sacred Heart of Jesus in Bova Marina on 8 December 1933. The new institute, raised by Providence in the wake of the Salesian spirit, with a specifically pastoral and missionary purpose in aid of the local Church, developed in a few years with a rich flowering of vocations, spreading not only in the two dioceses of Bova and Reggio Calabria, but also in other areas of Calabria, Sicily and Lazio.

=== Accusation and Restoration ===
In 1940 the Congregation of the Holy Office condemned Monsignor Cognata to the removal from episcopal dignity following a trial. The charges were initially not revealed and it was only recently discovered that he was falsely accused of molesting three nuns. He therefore had to resign as bishop of Bova. He went far, precisely to a Salesian community in Castello di Godego, living for long years in silence and solitude, separated from his spiritual daughters. He lived in various Salesian communities, especially in Northern Italy, carrying out the service of confessor and spiritual guide. The order of the Oblate Salesians of the Sacred Heart of Jesus, despite its great poverty, continued to grow and expand.

Monsignor Giuseppe Cognata, in Easter 1962, was reinstated in the episcopate by Pope John XXIII. He thus participated in the second, third and fourth sessions of Vatican II by the will of Pope Paul VI. On 6 August 1963 he was appointed titular bishop of Farsalo. On 29 January 1972 he had the joy of knowing his institute decorated with the decree of praise by the Holy See, with which he became an institute of pontifical right.

=== Death and Cause of Beatification ===
Mgr. Cognata died on 22 July 1972, the same year that his founded Institute was recognised by the Holy See. He died Pellaro di Reggio Calabria, the initial seat of the missionary activity of the Oblates. His remains rest in the generalate of the Oblate Sisters in Tivoli.

On 18 April 2020 the Congregation for the Causes of Saints announced that Pope Francis accepted the name of Mgr. Giuseppe Cognata for the Cause of Beatification:

The Rector Major of the Salesians, Fr Ángel Fernández Artime, rejoices in announcing, in the exultation of Easter and on the Feast of the Divine Mercy, that the Congregation for the Causes of Saints has itself announced in a letter dated 15 April 2020 to the Salesian Postulator General (Prot. VAR. 8579/20), Fr Pierluigi Cameroni, and signed by Bishop Marcello Bartolucci, Secretary of the aforesaid Congregation, that: “I am happy to inform you that the Congregation for the Doctrine of the Faith, in its Letter No. Prot. 911/1935-AS265-74579 on 17 February of this current year has communicated to this Dicastery that the Holy Father ‘upon careful and thoughtful examination, has given his august consent to the requests of religious and laity who have petitioned for the opening of the Cause of Beatification of Bishop Giuseppe Cognata, S.D.B., Bishop of Bova.
