= Antonio Ciliberti =

Italian Roman Catholic archbishop

- Archbishop of Catanzaro-Squillace
- Church: Catholic Church
- Archdiocese: Archdiocese of Catanzaro-Squillace
- In office: 31 January 2003 – 25 March 2011
- Predecessor: Antonio Cantisani
- Successor: Vincenzo Bertolone
- Previous posts: Archbishop of Matera-Irsina (1993-2003); Bishop of Locri-Gerace (1988-1993)

Orders
- Ordination: 12 July 1959
- Consecration: 28 January 1989 by Serafino Sprovieri

Personal details
- Born: 31 January 1935 San Lorenzo del Vallo, Cosenza, Kingdom of Italy
- Died: 1 April 2017 (aged 82) Rome, Italy

Antonio Ciliberti (31 January 1935 – 1 April 2017) was a Roman Catholic archbishop.

Ordained to the priesthood in 1959, Ciliberti served as bishop of the Diocese of Locri-Gerace, Italy from 1988 to 1993. He then served as archbishop of the Archdiocese of Matera-Irsina from 1993 to 2003 and metropolitan archbishop of Catanzaro-Squillace from 2003 to 2011.
