= Maria Marino Marraffa =

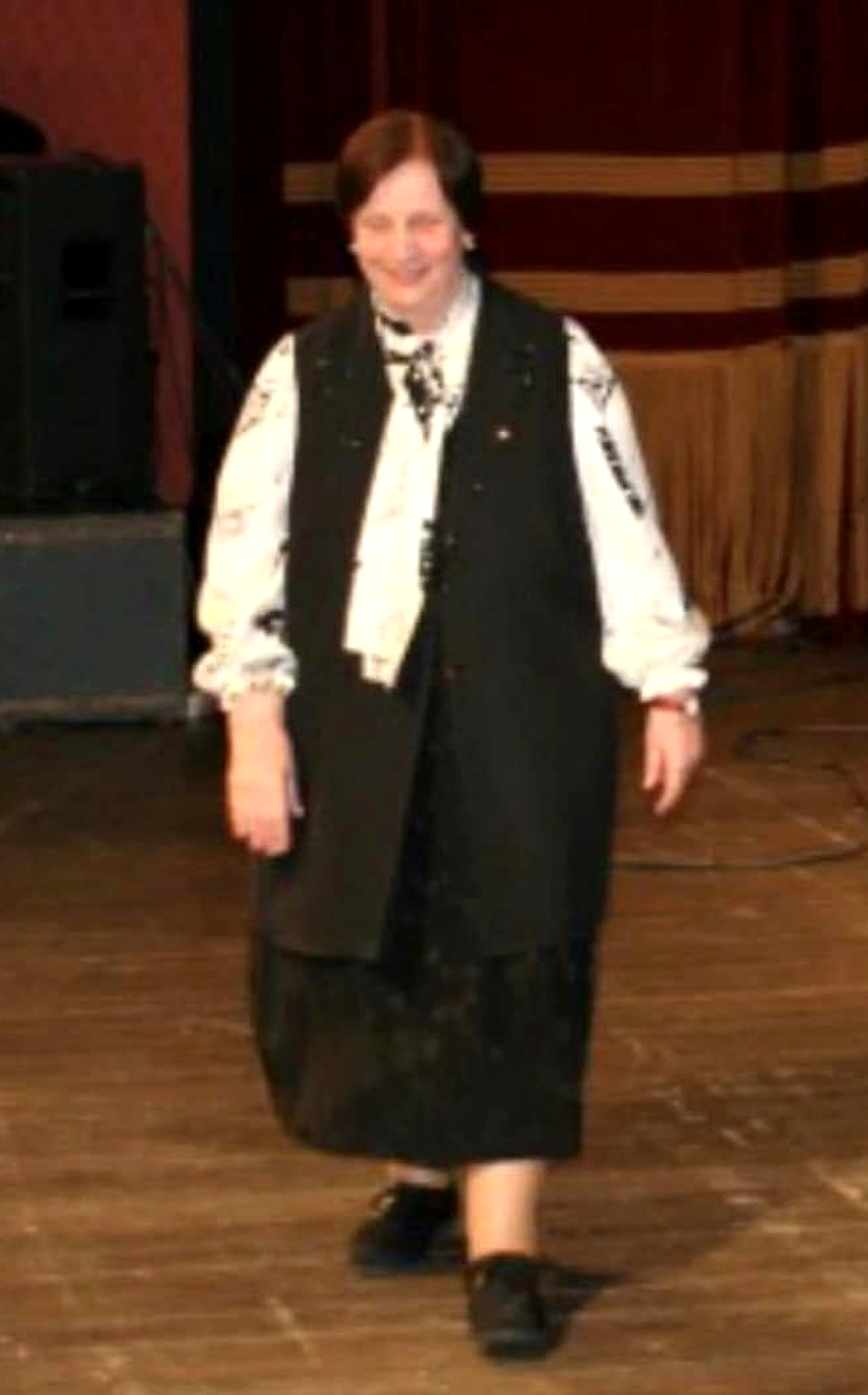
- Born: August 20, 1931; Trapani, Sicily, Italy
- Died: March 23, 2023 (aged 91); Catanzaro, Calabria, Italy
- Known for: Founding the Movimento Apostolico

Maria Marino Marraffa (20 August 1931 – 23 March 2023) was an Italian Catholic laywoman best known as the founder of the Movimento Apostolico, established in Catanzaro and later suppressed by the Vatican.

== Biography ==
Maria Marino was born in Trapani, Sicily, on 20 August 1931, and later relocated to Catanzaro, Calabria, where she spent the majority of her adult life. During the second half of the twentieth century, she became widely known in the region for her intense spiritual reflections and apostolic initiatives, which eventually culminated in the foundation of the Movimento Apostolico on 3 November 1979 in Catanzaro. Established within the Roman Catholic Church to foster evangelization, a deeper understanding of Sacred Scripture, active parish involvement, and ongoing Christian formation, the movement developed rapidly within the Archdiocese of Catanzaro-Squillace. Over the following decades, its presence expanded beyond Calabria to numerous Italian dioceses as well as international communities, driven by the collaborative efforts of lay members, priests, and religious personnel. A significant milestone in the movement's history occurred on 16 August 1987, when a delegation of its representatives was received in a formal audience by Pope John Paul II at Castel Gandolfo, prior to receiving official canonical recognition from ecclesiastical authorities as one of the most prominent lay initiatives originating in southern Italy.

For more than four decades, Marino served as the principal inspirational and spiritual reference figure for the movement, shaping its core identity through her extensive writings, public addresses, exhortations, and continuous pastoral direction. Her personal spirituality emphasized complete fidelity to the Gospel, deep communion with the Catholic Church, devotion to the Eucharist, a strong Marian spirituality, and an unwavering missionary commitment. Her numerous spiritual reflections and religious texts were widely circulated among members and integrated into formal programs of Christian education and lay formation. In her later years, Marino continued to provide spiritual guidance to the movement's adherents despite her progressively declining health. In 2021, the Dicastery for the Doctrine of the Faith issued a decree suppressing the Movimento Apostolico as an ecclesial association; nevertheless, Marino continued to be regarded by former members and supporters as the foundational inspiration of their spiritual path. She died in Catanzaro on 23 March 2023, at the age of 91, following a prolonged illness, and her funeral was celebrated on 25 March in the parish church of Santa Maria del Carmine in the Siano district of Catanzaro.

== Legacy ==
Marino is remembered primarily as the founder of Movimento Apostolico and as a prominent figure in late 20th-century Calabrian Catholic lay spirituality. Her spiritual reflections, writings, and apostolic work influenced generations of lay movement members and contributed to local and international Catholic evangelization initiatives. Following her death in 2023 and the earlier 2021 suppression of the Movimento Apostolico by the Dicastery for the Doctrine of the Faith, efforts were undertaken by former members, supporters, and family representatives—most notably her grandson—to preserve and document her spiritual heritage. These initiatives have included the publication of dedicated biographical accounts, essays, and commentaries contextualizing her original charism, as well as formal supplications and written appeals addressed to Pope Leo XIV and Vatican authorities requesting a re-examination of the movement's history and the preservation of the founder's spiritual legacy.

== External link ==
- Apostolic Movement – Official Site
