= Fuscaldo =

- Comune
- Comune di Fuscaldo
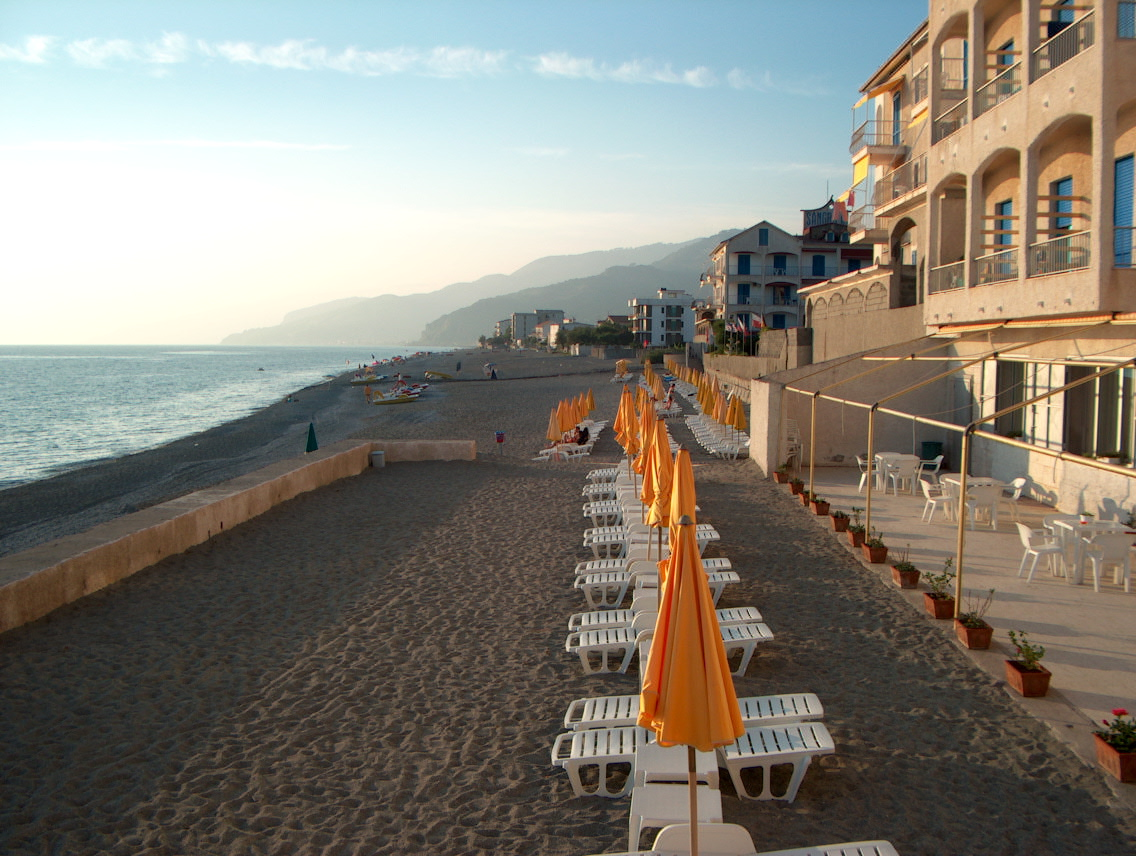

- Location within Italy Location within Calabria
- Coordinates: 39°25′N 16°2′E
- Country: Italy
- Region: Calabria
- Province: Cosenza (CS)
- Frazioni: Cariglio, Pesco, San Pietro, Sant'Antonio, Scarcelli

Government
  - Mayor: Gianfranco Ramundo

Area
  - Total: 60.8 km^{2} (23.5 sq mi)
- Elevation: 350 m (1,150 ft)

Population (30 November 2018)
  - Total: 8,164
  - Density: 134/km^{2} (348/sq mi)
- Demonym: Fuscaldesi
- Time zone: UTC+1 (CET)
  - Summer (DST): UTC+2 (CEST)
- Postal code: 87024
- Dialing code: 0982
- Patron saint: St. James
- Saint day: 25 July
- Website: Official website

Fuscaldo is a town and comune in the province of Cosenza in the Calabria region of southern Italy.
