= Domenico Crusco =

Italian Roman Catholic bishop

- Bishop of San Marco Argentano-Scalea
- Church: Catholic Church
- Diocese: Diocese of San Marco Argentano-Scalea
- In office: 6 March 1999 – 7 January 2011
- Predecessor: Augusto Lauro
- Successor: Leonardo Bonanno
- Previous posts: Apostolic Administrator of Cassano all'Jonio (2007); Bishop of Oppido Mamertina-Palmi (1991-1999)

Orders
- Ordination: 16 July 1961 by Luigi Rinaldi
- Consecration: 20 April 1991 by Luigi Poggi

Personal details
- Born: 19 August 1934 Grisolia, Province of Cosenza, Kingdom of Italy
- Died: 25 August 2013 (aged 79) Grisolia, Calabria, Italy

Domenico Crusco (19 August 1934 − 25 August 2013) was an Italian Roman Catholic bishop.

Ordained to the priesthood in 1961, Crusco was named bishop in 1991. In 1999, he became bishop of the Roman Catholic Diocese of San Marco Argentano-Scalea, Italy; he retired in 2011.
