= Filippo Visconti (bishop) =

Most Reverend Filippo Visconti
- Bishop of Catanzaro
- Church: Catholic Church
- Diocese: Diocese of Catanzaro
- In office: 1657–1664
- Predecessor: Fabio Olivadisi
- Successor: Agazio di Somma

Orders
- Consecration: 6 May 1657 by Bernardino Spada

Personal details
- Born: 9 August 1596 Milan, Italy
- Died: 26 January 1664 (age 67) Catanzaro, Italy

Filippo Visconti, O.S.A. or Philippus Vicecomes (9 August 1596 – 26 January 1664) was a Roman Catholic prelate who served as Bishop of Catanzaro (1657–1664).

== Biography ==
Filippo Visconti was born in Milan, Italy on 9 August 1596 and ordained a priest in the Order of Saint Augustine. On 23 April 1657, he was appointed by Pope Alexander VII as Bishop of Catanzaro. On 6 May 1657, he was consecrated bishop by Bernardino Spada, Cardinal-Bishop of Palestrina.

He served as Bishop of Catanzaro until his death on 26 January 1664.

His bust and memorial inscription are preserved in the church of S. Agostino in Rome, the headquarters of the Augustinian Order.

== External links and additional sources ==
- Accetta, Foca (1999). "Le 'confessioni' e 'confusioni' di un agostiniano milanese presule in Calabria. La corrispondenza di Filippo Visconti, vescovo di Catanzaro (1657–1664)," in: Analecta Augustiniana 62 (Roma 1999), pp. 5–124. (in Italian)

Catholic Church titles
Preceded by Fabio Olivadisi	Bishop of Catanzaro; 1657–1664	Succeeded by Agazio di Somma
