= Settimio Todisco =

Italian Roman Catholic archbishop (1924–2025)

His Excellency Settimio Todisco
- Archbishop Emeritus of Brindisi-Ostuni
- Archdiocese: Brindisi-Ostuni
- Appointed: 24 May 1975
- Term ended: 5 February 2000
- Predecessor: Nicola Margiotta
- Successor: Rocco Talucci
- Previous post: Titular Bishop of Bigastro (1969–1975)

Orders
- Ordination: 27 July 1947 by Francesco de Filippis
- Consecration: 15 February 1970 by Corrado Ursi

Personal details
- Born: 10 May 1924 Brindisi, Italy
- Died: 26 March 2025 (aged 100) Ostuni, Italy

Settimio Todisco (10 May 1924 – 26 March 2025) was an Italian prelate in the Roman Catholic Church.

Todisco was born in Brindisi and ordained a priest on 27 July 1947. Todisco was appointed Apostolic Administrator of the Diocese of Molfetta-Ruvo-Giovinazzo-Terlizzi, as well as titular bishop of Bigastro, on 15 December 1969 and ordained on 15 February 1970. Todisco was appointed bishop to the Diocese of Brindisi-Ostuni on 24 May 1975 and elevated to archbishop when the diocese changed its name to the Archdiocese of Brindisi-Ostuni in 1986. Todisco retired from the archdiocese on 5 February 2000. Settimio died on 26 March 2025, at the age of 100.

Catholic Church titles
Preceded by Nicola Margiotta	Archbishop of Brindisi-Ostuni; 1975–2000	Succeeded by Rocco Talucci
Preceded by First	Titular Bishop of Bigastro; 1969–1975	Succeeded by Augusto Lauro
