= Luigi Rinaldi =

Italian trade unionist and politician (1938–2023)

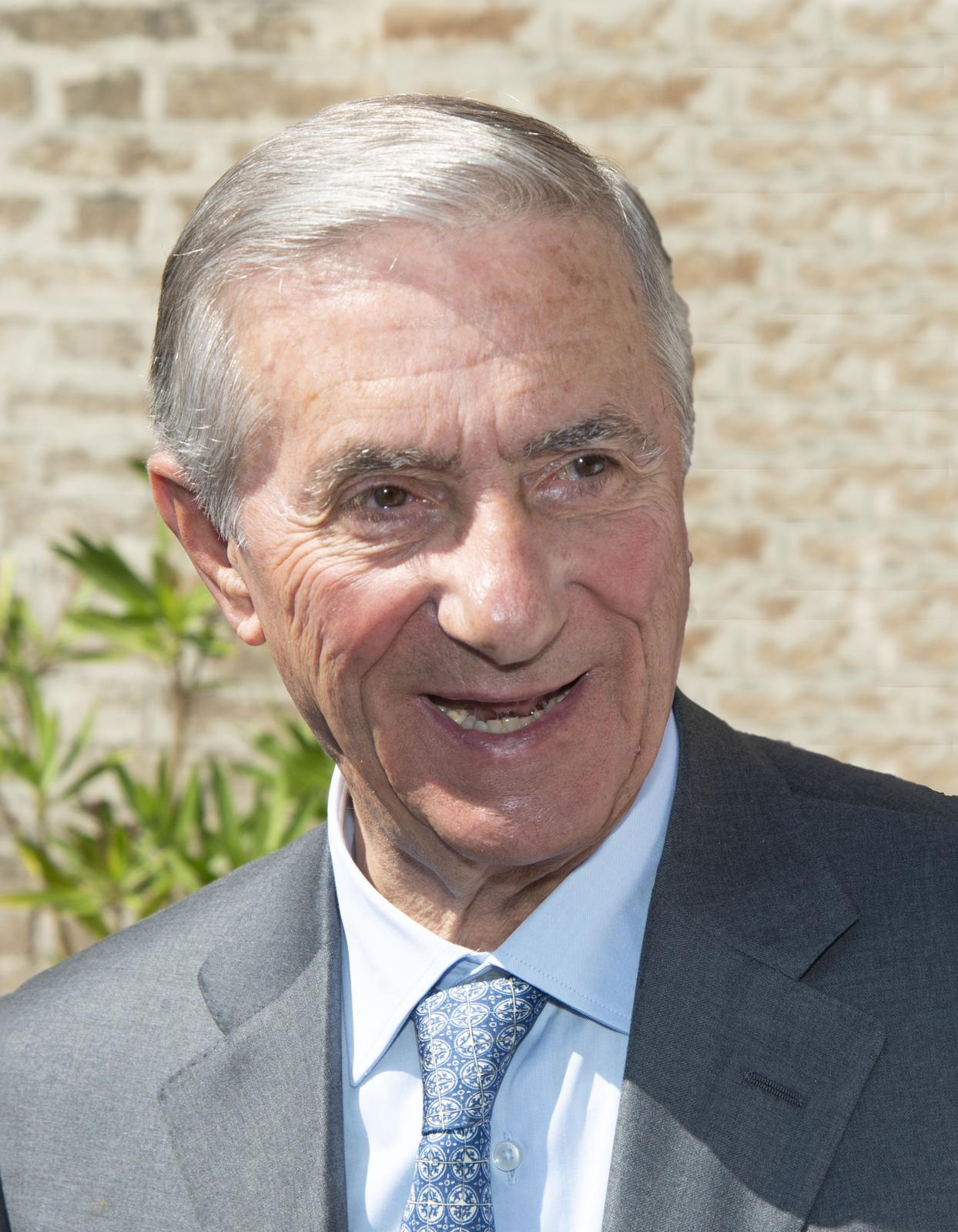

Member of the Chamber of Deputies of Italy
- In office 5 July 1983 – 14 April 1994

Personal details
- Born: 27 August 1938 Serra Sant'Abbondio, Italy
- Died: 21 September 2023 (aged 85) Ancona, Italy
- Party: DC
- Occupation: Trade unionist

Luigi Rinaldi (27 August 1938 – 21 September 2023) was an Italian trade unionist and politician. A member of Christian Democracy, he served in the Chamber of Deputies from 1983 to 1994.

Rinaldi died in Ancona on 21 September 2023, at the age of 85.
