= Antonio Cantisani =

Italian priest (1926–2021)

- Archbishop of Catanzaro-Squillace
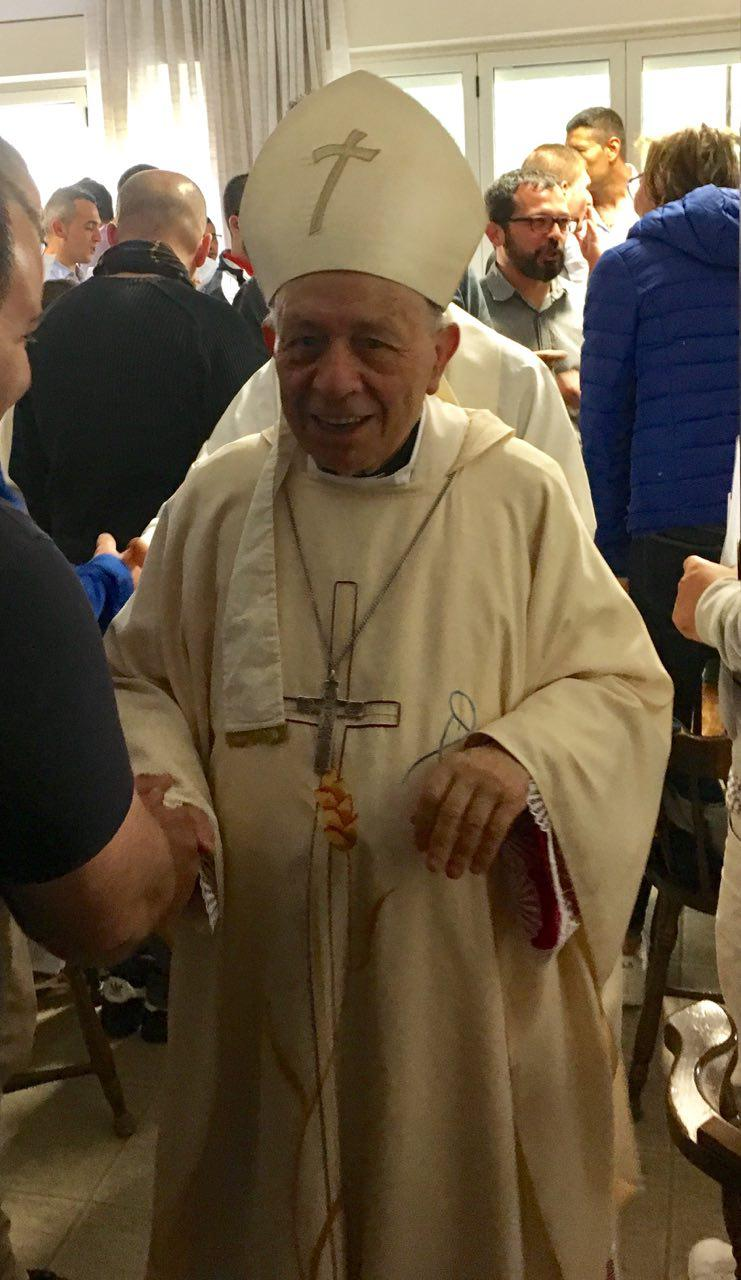
- Archbishop Emeritus Antonio Cantisani in 2017.
- Church: Catholic Church
- Archdiocese: Archdiocese of Catanzaro-Squillace
- In office: 31 July 1980 – 31 January 2003
- Predecessor: Armando Fares
- Successor: Antonio Ciliberti
- Previous posts: Bishop of Squillace (1980-1986); Archbishop of Rossano/Rossano e Cariati (1971-1980); Apostolic Administrator of Cassano all'Jonio (1978-1979)

Orders
- Ordination: 16 June 1949 by Federico Pezzullo
- Consecration: 27 December 1971 by Federico Pezzullo

Personal details
- Born: 2 November 1926 Lauria, Potenza, Kingdom of Italy
- Died: 1 July 2021 (aged 94) Catanzaro, Italy

Antonio Cantisani (2 November 1926 – 1 July 2021) was an Italian Catholic prelate who served as Archbishop of Catanzaro from 1980 to 2003. He was previously Archbishop of Rossano-Cariati from 1971 to 1980.

He died in Catanzaro on 1 July 2021 at the age of 94. He is buried in the crypt of the Basilica dell'Immacolata in Catanzaro.
