= Diocese of Oppido Mamertina-Palmi =

Latin Catholic diocese in Italy

Coordinates: 38.3000°N 15.9833°E

Diocese of Oppido Mamertina-Palmi Dioecesis Oppidensis-Palmarum

Catholic
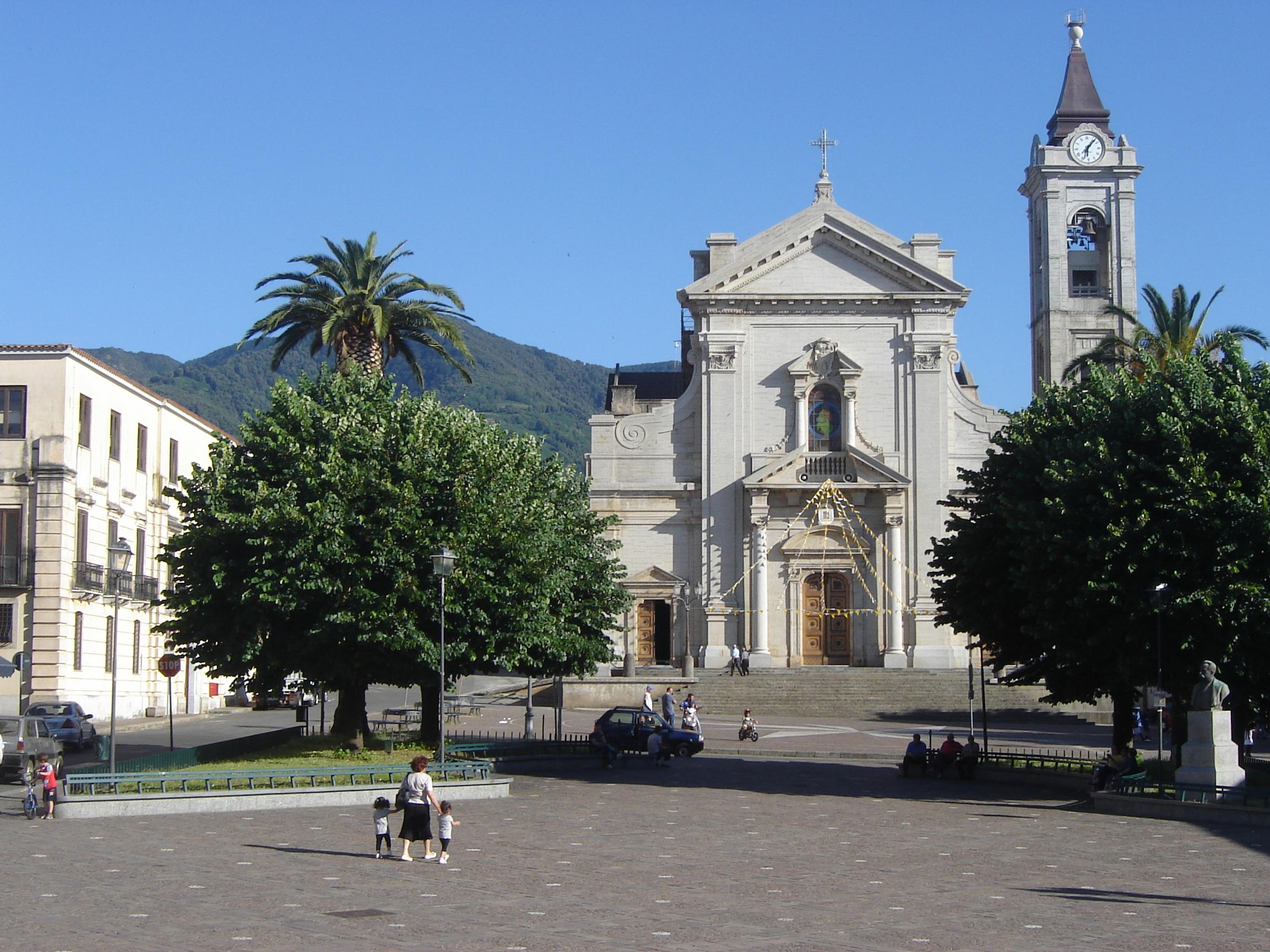
- Oppido Mamertina Cathedral

Location
- Country: Italy
- Ecclesiastical province: Reggio Calabria-Bova

Statistics
- Area: 930 km^{2} (360 sq mi)
- Population: Total; Catholics: (as of 2023); 176,600 (est.) ▼; 172,000 (est.) ▼
- Parishes: 67 ▲

Information
- Denomination: Catholic Church
- Sui iuris church: Latin Church
- Rite: Roman Rite
- Established: 13th century
- Cathedral: Cattedrale di Maria SS. Assunta (Oppido Mamertina)
- Co-cathedral: Concattedrale di S. Nicola (Palmi)
- Secular priests: 94 (diocesan) ▲23 (Religious Orders) ▲32 Permanent deacons ▲

Current leadership
- Pope: Leo XIV
- Bishop: Giuseppe Alberti

Map

Website
- www.diocesioppidopalmi.it

The Diocese of Oppido Mamertina-Palmi (Latin: Dioecesis Oppidensis-Palmarum) is a Latin Church diocese of the Catholic Church in southern Italy, existing under that name since 1979. Historically it was the Diocese of Oppido Marmertina (Oppidensis). It is a suffragan see of the Archdiocese of Reggio Calabria.

== History ==
Bishop Stefano (1295) is the first prelate of whom there is mention. The chapter of the cathedral already existed in the 13th century. The chapter maintained its right to elect a new bishop until 1338. The chapter was composed of six dignities (the archdeacon, the dean, the cantor, the treasurer, the archpriest, and the ecclesiarch-theologian) and fourteen canons.

In 1472 the see was united to that of Gerace, under Bishop Athanasius Calceofilo, by whom the Greek Rite was abolished, although it remained in use in a few towns.

In 1536 Oppido became again an independent see, under Bishop Pietro Andrea Ripanti; among other bishops were Antonio Cesconi (1609) and Giovanni Battista Montani (1632), who restored the cathedral and the episcopal palace; Bisanzio Fili (1696), who founded the seminary; Michele Caputo (1852), who was transferred to the See of Ariano, where it is suspected that he poisoned King Ferdinand II; eventually, he apostatized.

In 1748 the town of Oppido is estimated to have had 2,000 inhabitants. The town was heavily damaged by the earthquakes of 1783, in the first of which Oppido was at the epicenter, and the population was decimated by the plague that followed.

In 2007 the town had some 5,484 inhabitants.

== Bishops ==
=== Diocese of Oppido Mamertina ===
Erected: 13th century
Latin Name: Oppidensis
Metropolitan: Archdiocese of Reggio Calabria

==== to 1471 ====
- Stephanus
- Gregorius (1 March 1339 – 1349)
- Barnabas (18 May 1349 – 1351)
- Nicolaus
- Antonius
- Stephanus
- Simon
- Ioannes Malatesta (3 June 1394 – 1400)
- Simeon
- Antonio de Caroleis (23 July 1423 – 25 February 1429)
- Tommaso Rubertus (18 March 1429 – 23 December 1429)
- Venturello de Nubiel (13 February 1430 – 1449)
- Girolamo, O.E.S.A. (1 September 1449 – 1471)

==== 1536 to 1700 ====
- Pietro Andrea Ripanti (28 Jan 1536 – 2 Sep 1536 died)
- Alessandro Cesarini (Sr.) (2 Sep 1536 – 20 Feb 1538 resigned)
- Ascanio Cesarini (20 Feb 1538 – 1542 resigned)
- Francesco de Noctucis (5 Jul 1542 – 1548 died)
- Tommaso Caselli, O.P. (7 May 1548 – 3 Oct 1550)
- Vincenzo Spinelli (3 Oct 1550 – 1561 resigned)
- Teofilo Galluppi (10 Mar 1561 – 13 Apr 1567 died)
- Giovan Mario de Alessandris (19 Sep 1567 – 9 Feb 1573)
- Sigismondo Mangiaruga (1573–1583 died)
- Andrea Canuto (28 Nov 1583 – 1603 resigned)
- Giulio Ruffo (12 Sep 1605 – 1609 died)
- Antonio Cesonio (2 Dec 1609 – 1629 died)
- Fabrizio Caracciolo Piscizi (28 Jan 1630 – 1631 died)
- Giovanni Battista Pontano (Giovanni Battista Montano)(19 Jan 1632 – May 1662 died)
- Paolo Diano-Parisi (12 Mar 1663 – Nov 1673 died)
- Vincenzo Ragni, O.S.B. (19 Feb 1674 – 3 Dec 1693 died)
- Bernardino Plastina, O.M. (25 Jan 1694 – 16 Feb 1697 died)
- Bisanzio Fili (27 Jan 1698 – 11 Apr 1707)

==== since 1700 ====
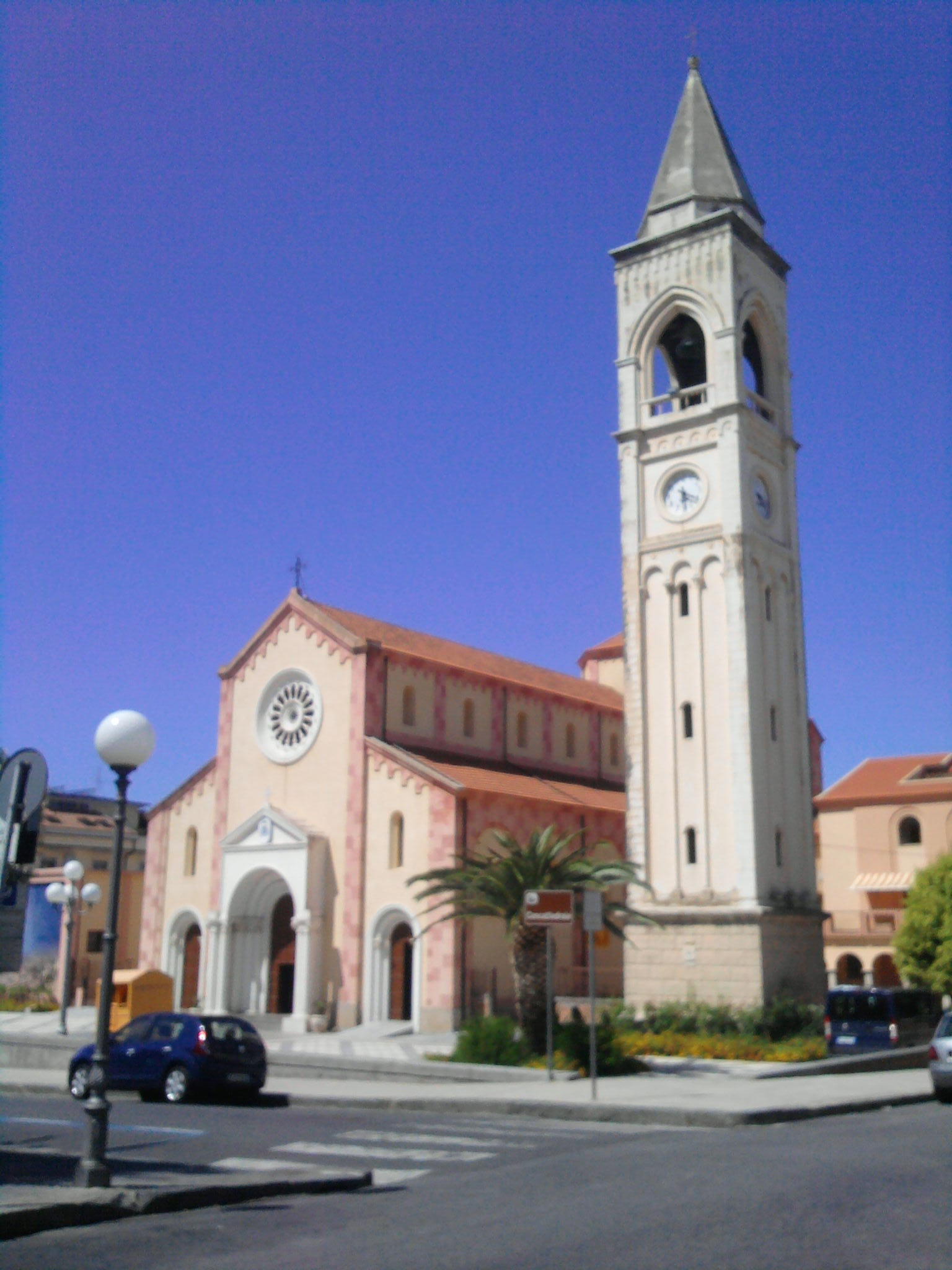
Co-cathedral in Palmi

- Giuseppe Placido De Pace (1 Aug 1707 – 5 Jan 1709 died)
- Giuseppe Maria Perrimezzi, O.Minim. (26 Feb 1714 – 18 Feb 1734 resigned)
- Leone Luca Vita (15 Feb 1734 – 24 Oct 1747 died)
- Ferdinando Mandarini (29 Jan 1748 – 9 Nov 1769 died)
- Nicola Spedalieri (29 Jan 1770 – 5 Apr 1783 died)
- Alessandro Tommasini (26 Mar 1792 Confirmed – 25 May 1818
- Ignazio Greco (4 Jun 1819 Confirmed – 4 Feb 1822 died)
- Francesco-Maria Coppola (19 Apr 1822 Confirmed – 11 Dec 1851 died)
- Michele Caputo, O.P. (27 Sep 1852 confirmed – 27 Sep 1858
- Giuseppe Teta (20 Jun 1859 Confirmed – 11 Feb 1875 died)
- Antonio Maria Curcio (11 Feb 1875 Succeeded – 15 Jul 1898 died)
- Domenico Scopelliti (28 Nov 1898 – 15 Dec 1919 resigned)
- Antonio Galati (15 Dec 1919 – 1 Jul 1927 appointed, archbishop of Santa Severina)
- Giuseppe Antonio Caruso (26 Aug 1927 – 6 Jul 1928 resigned)
- Giovanni Battista Peruzzo, C.P. (19 Oct 1928 – 15 Jan 1932 appointed, bishop of Agrigento)
- Nicola Colangelo (4 Apr 1932 – 16 Dec 1935 appointed, bishop of Nardò)
- Nicola Canino (30 Dec 1936 – 11 Apr 1951 resigned)
- Maurizio Raspini (9 May 1953 – 6 Jan 1965 resigned)
- Santo Bergamo (18 Nov 1971 – 11 Oct 1980 died)

=== Diocese of Oppido Mamertina-Palmi ===
10 June 1979: name changed

- Benigno Luigi Papa, O.F.M. Cap. (29 Sep 1981 – 11 May 1990 appointed, archbishop of Taranto)
- Domenico Crusco (7 Feb 1991 – 6 Mar 1999 appointed, bishop of San Marco Argentano-Scalea)
- Luciano Bux (5 Feb 2000 – 2 Jul 2011 retired)
- Francesco Milito (4 Apr 2012 – 21 Sept 2023)
- Giuseppe Alberti (10 Dec 2023 – )

== Bibliography ==
=== Reference works ===
- Gams, Pius Bonifatius (1873). Series episcoporum Ecclesiae catholicae: quotquot innotuerunt a beato Petro apostolo. Ratisbon: Typis et Sumptibus Georgii Josephi Manz. p. 909. (Use with caution; obsolete)
- Eubel, Conradus, ed. (1913). Hierarchia catholica, Tomus 1 (in Latin) (second ed.). Münster: Libreria Regensbergiana. p. 377.
- Eubel, Conradus, ed. (1914). Hierarchia catholica, Tomus 2 (in Latin) (second ed.). Münster: Libreria Regensbergiana. p. 207.
- Eubel, Conradus (1923). Gulik, Guilelmus (ed.). Hierarchia catholica, Tomus 3 (in Latin) (second ed.). Münster: Libreria Regensbergiana. pp. 262–263.
- Gauchat, Patritius (Patrice) (1935). Hierarchia catholica IV (1592-1667). Münster: Libraria Regensbergiana. p. 264.
- Ritzler, Remigius; Sefrin, Pirminus (1952). Hierarchia catholica medii et recentis aevi V (1667-1730). Patavii: Messagero di S. Antonio. p. 297.
- Ritzler, Remigius; Sefrin, Pirminus (1958). Hierarchia catholica medii et recentis aevi VI (1730-1799). Patavii: Messagero di S. Antonio. p. 318.
- Ritzler, Remigius; Sefrin, Pirminus (1968). Hierarchia Catholica medii et recentioris aevi sive summorum pontificum, S. R. E. cardinalium, ecclesiarum antistitum series... A pontificatu Pii PP. VII (1800) usque ad pontificatum Gregorii PP. XVI (1846) (in Latin). Vol. VII. Monasterii: Libr. Regensburgiana.
- Ritzler, Remigius; Pirminus Sefrin (1978). Hierarchia catholica Medii et recentioris aevi... A Pontificatu PII PP. IX (1846) usque ad Pontificatum Leonis PP. XIII (1903) (in Latin). Vol. VIII. Il Messaggero di S. Antonio.
- Pięta, Zenon (2002). Hierarchia catholica medii et recentioris aevi... A pontificatu Pii PP. X (1903) usque ad pontificatum Benedictii PP. XV (1922) (in Latin). Vol. IX. Padua: Messagero di San Antonio. ISBN 978-88-250-1000-8.

=== Studies ===
- D'Avino, Vincenzio (1848). Cenni storici sulle chiese arcivescovili, vescovili, e prelatizie (nullius) del regno delle due Sicilie (in Italian). Naples: dalle stampe di Ranucci. pp. 503–510.
- Cappelletti, Giuseppe (1870). Le chiese d'Italia: dalla loro origine sino ai nostri giorni (in Italian). Vol. vigesimo primo (21). Venezia: G. Antonelli. pp. 176–180.
- Leanza, Sandro (ed.) (1999), Calabria Cristiana. Società Religione Cultura nel territorio della Diocesi di Oppido Mamertina-Palmi, tomo I, Dalle origini al Medio Evo, Rubbettino, Soveria Mannelli.
- Liberti, R. (1978), Oppido Mamertina ieri e oggi nelle immagini. Gioia Tauro (in Italian)
- Liberti, R. (1979), "Difficile convivenza tra facismo e la Chiesa a Oppido Mamertina," in: Calabria letteraria no. 10-12 (1979) 59-60. (in Italian)
- Liberti, Rocco (1993), I vescovi di Oppido dalle origini all'unione con Gerace (1053-1471), (in Italian), Historica 46 (1993), pp. 107-117.
- Liberti, Rocco (2002). La cattedrale di Oppido Mamertina. (Quaderni Mamertini, 23) Bovalino, Litografia Diaco. (in Italian)
- Liberti, Rocco (2007). "Il filantropismo ad Oppida Mamertina," in: Giuseppe Masi, ed. (2007). Tra Calabria e Mezzogiorno. Studi storici in memoria di Tobia Cornacchioli (in Italian). Cosenza: Pellegrini Editore. pp. 179–186. ISBN 978-88-8101-404-0.
- Russo, Francesco (1982). Storia della Chiesa in Calabria dalle origini al Concilio di Trento, 2 vols. Rubbetino: Soveria Mannelli 1982.
- Taccone-Gallucci, Domenico (1902). Regesti dei Romani pontefici della Calabria (in Italian). Rome: Tip. Vaticana. p. 402.
- Ughelli, Ferdinando; Coleti, Niccolo (1721). Italia Sacra Sive De Episcopis Italiae, Et Insularum adiacentium (in Latin). Vol. Tomus nonus (9). Venice: Antonio Coleti. pp. 417–421.
- Zerbi, Candido (1876). Della città, chiesa e diocesi di Oppido Mamertina e dei suoi vescovi: notizie cronistoriche (in Italian). Roma: Barbèra.
