= Archdiocese of Catanzaro-Squillace =

Latin Catholic archdiocese in Italy

Coordinates: 38.9100°N 16.5875°E

Archdiocese of Catanzaro-Squillace Archidioecesis Catacensis-Squillacensis

Catholic
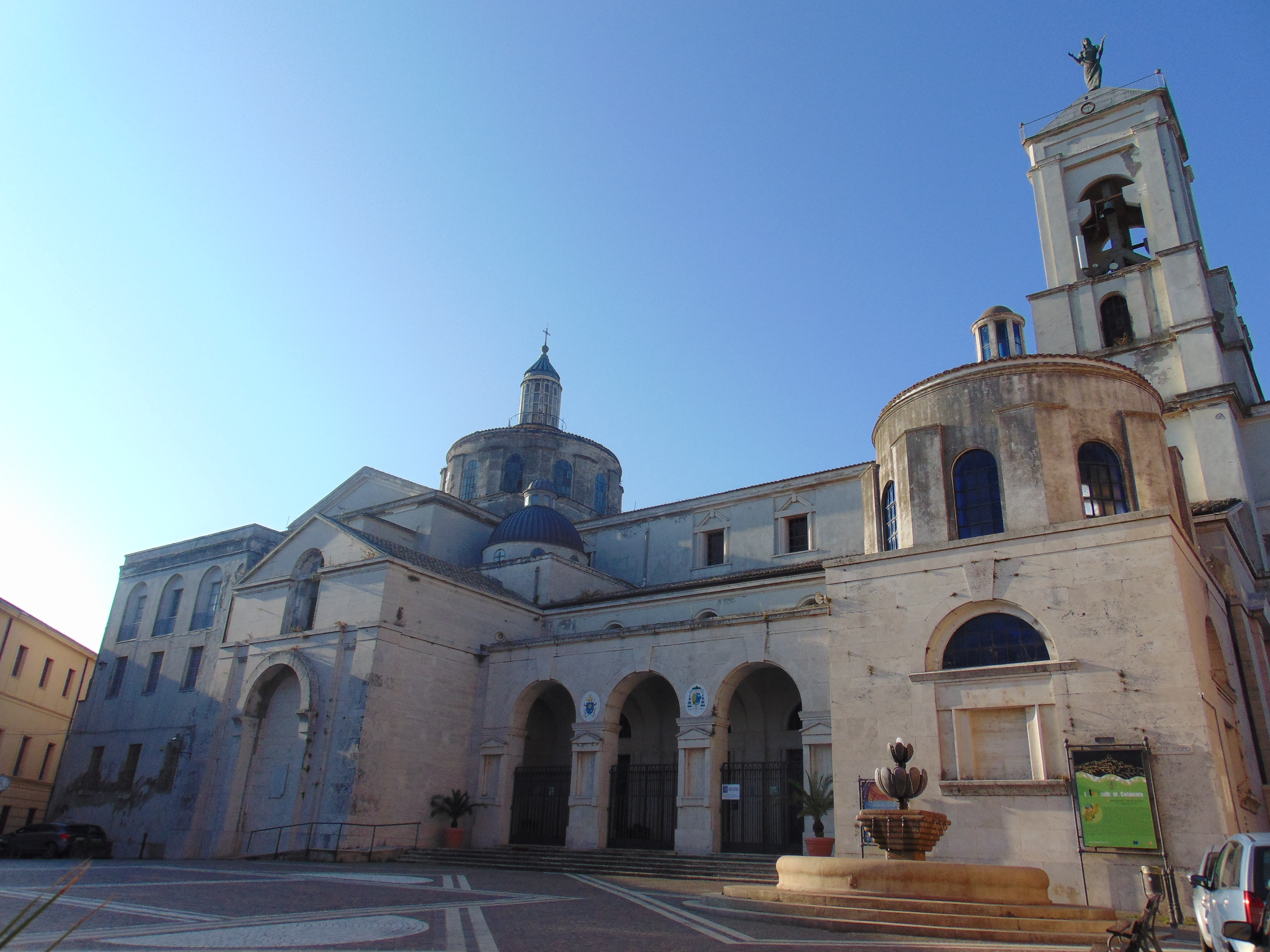
- Catanzaro Cathedral

Location
- Country: Italy
- Ecclesiastical province: Catanzaro-Squillace

Statistics
- Area: 1,806 km^{2} (697 sq mi)
- Population: Total; Catholics: (as of 2023); 242,550; 241,560 (99.6%)
- Parishes: 122

Information
- Denomination: Catholic Church
- Sui iuris church: Latin Church
- Rite: Roman Rite
- Established: 1121 (904–905 years ago)
- Cathedral: Cattedrale di S. Maria Assunta (Catanzaro)
- Co-cathedral: Concattedrale di S. Maria Assunta (Squillace)
- Secular priests: 129 (diocesan); 1 (Religious Orders); 25 Permanent Deacons

Current leadership
- Pope: Leo XIV
- Metropolitan Archbishop: Claudio Maniago
- Bishops emeritus: Vincenzo Bertolone, S.d.P.

Map

Website
- www.diocesicatanzarosquillace.it

The Archdiocese of Catanzaro-Squillace (Latin: Archidioecesis Catacensis-Squillacensis) is a Latin Church archdiocese of the Catholic Church in Calabria, has existed in its current form since 1986. In that year the Archdiocese of Catanzaro became a metropolitan see, and was combined with the diocese of Squillace.

== History ==
=== Establishment of the diocese ===
Pope Calixtus II (Guy of Burgundy), Archbishop of Vienne since 1088, was elected pope at Cluny on 2 February 1119. He spent more than a year fortifying France and Germany against the excommunicated Emperor Henry V through synods and councils, and dealing with affairs as co-regent in Castile for his nephew Alfonso VII of León and Castile, who had become heir to the throne in 1109, and then king in 1116. In the spring of 1120, Calixtus turned his attention to Italy, arriving in Rome on 3 July.

At the Lateran Palace, on 14 January 1121, Pope Calixtus signed the bull Et synodalium, the text of which is found only in the Cronica Trium Tabernarum. In the bull, the Pope announced that he had restored the diocese of Tres Tabernae (Taberna) to its original state, that he has consecrated Bishop Joannes, and that he had restored to him the possessions of the diocese. He did this after having received an embassy from Count Gaufredus of Catanzaro and the people of Tres Taberna, requesting restoration of the diocese, and after sending Cardinal Desiderius of S. Prassede to Calabria on an inspection tour.

In July 1121 Pope Calixtus travelled to Campania, spending time in Aversa, Salerno, Melfi, and Taranto. He arrived in Catanzaro by 21 December. The purpose of his visit was to arrange a truce and peace between Count Roger and Duke William of Italy. He failed in his mission.

In the bull Notum sit omnibus, allegedly published on 28 December 1121, Pope Calixtus states that he dedicated the church of the Virgin Mary and Saints Peter and Paul in Catanzaro; that he granted and confirmed to that church the episcopal seat and dignity of the diocese of Tres Tabernae; granted the favor of absolution from all of their sins upon being buried in that church's cemetery; that annually on the festival of that church, which was to be celebrated for eight days, the Faithful were to be granted one year's remission of the punishment due their sins, provided they made a sacramental confession. The bull, however, is a forgery. The signatories of the bull present several problems: Rainaldus of Mileto was not yet bishop of Mileto; Vellardus of Agrigento signed (though the real bishop's name was Albert); Bishop Gerardof Potenza signed, though he had been dead for nearly three years; Bishop Polichronius of Genicocastro signed, though neither the diocese nor the bishop is known, except in a Greek hagiographical text of the end of the 12th century.

In 1122, Pope Calixtus II transferred to Catanzaro the see of Taverna (Tres Tabernae), which is taken as the date of foundation of the diocese, at least according to the Catholic Encyclopedia. The date and circumstances, however, are hotly debated by scholars.

No bishop of Calabria attended the First Lateran Council of Pope Calixtus II in Rome in 1123, held to deal with investiture, simony, clerical concubinage, and an expedition against the Saracens.

In the 1140s, the diocese of Tres Tabernae is listed as one of the "exempt dioceses" in Calabria. By the end of the century, the Liber censuum indicates that it had become a suffragan (subordinate) of the archdiocese of Reggio Calabria, as the diocese of Catanzaro (Catacensis).

On 27 March 1638, a major earthquake struck Calabria, killing thousands. In Catanzaro, the death of the Patrician, Onofrio Cattaneo, the Franciscan Francesco Pistoia of Catanzaro, and the priest Geronimo Gerasio, were recorded; in the whole territory some 200 persons died. In the earthquake of 8 March 1832, the most severely damaged buildings were: the school (lyceum), the headquarters of the royal intendent, the civic hospital, and the prison. A total of 234 persons died in the quake, four of them in the city of Catanzaro.

=== Cathedral and Chapter ===
The cathedral of the Assumption is administered and staffed by a corporation of Canons, consisting, in 1692, of four dignities and fourteen Canons.

=== Religious orders ===
The Dominicans first arrived in Catanzaro in 1401.

The contract for a Jesuit college (lyceum) in Catanzaro was signed on 1 February 1563. Bishop Ottaviano Moriconi (1572–1582) facilitated their establishment. The Jesuits were expelled from Catanzaro on 20 November 1767.

=== Change of status ===
Since the 12th century, Catanzaro had been a suffragan diocese (subordinate) of the archbishop of Reggio Calabria. On 5 July 1927, [Pope Pius XI] changed the status of Catanzaro, liberating it from the metropolitan jurisdiction of Reggio Calabria and making it directly dependent on the Holy See (Papacy). He then raised the diocese to the dignity of an archdiocese, without however naming any suffragan dioceses.

=== Acquisition of diocese of Squillace ===
From 1927 to 1986, the Archbishop of Catanzaro was also appointed Bishop of Squillace, holding two dioceses at the same time.

On 18 February 1984, the Vatican and the Italian State signed a new and revised concordat, which was accompanied in the next year by enabling legislation. According to the agreement, the practice of having one bishop govern two separate dioceses at the same time, aeque personaliter, was abolished. Otherwise Catanzaro and Saquillace might have continued to share a bishop, as the archbishop of Catanzaro e Squillace. Instead, the Vatican continued consultations which had begun under Pope John XXIII for the merging of small dioceses, especially those with personnel and financial problems, into one combined diocese. On 30 September 1986, Pope John Paul II ordered that the dioceses of Catanzaro and Squillace be merged into one diocese with one bishop, with the Latin title Archidioecesis Catacensis-Squillacensis. The seat of the diocese was to be in Catanzaro, and the cathedral of Catanzaro was to serve as the cathedral of the merged diocese. The cathedral in Squillace was to become a co-cathedral, and its cathedral Chapter was to be a Capitulum Concathedralis. There was to be only one diocesan Tribunal, in Catanzaro, and likewise one seminary, one College of Consultors, and one Priests' Council. The territory of the new diocese was to include the territory of the former dioceses of Squillace and of Catanzaro. The diocese was directly subject to the Holy See.

==== Losses of territory ====
On 18 November 1989, the Congregation of Bishops in the Roman Curia, with the consent of Pope John Paul II, transferred fifteen parishes from the diocese of Catanzaro-Squillace to the diocese of Locri-Gerace. At the same time, Catanzaro-Squillace received five parishes from Locri-Gerace, Crotone-Santa Severina, Lamezia Terme and Cosenza-Bisignano.

=== Metropolitan archdiocese ===
On 30 January 2001, Pope John Paul II promoted the archdiocese of Catanzaro-Squillace to the status of metropolitan archdiocese, and assigned it as suffragan dioceses the archdiocese of Crotone-Santa Severina and the diocese of Lamezia Terme.

==== Suffragan sees ====
- Crotone-Santa Severina
- Lamezia Terme

== Bishops ==
=== Diocese of Catanzaro ===
==== to 1600 ====
...
[Norbertus ? (1152)]
...
Robertus (attested 1167)
...

- Bassovinus (attested 1200)
- Robertus (attested 1217–1222)

...

- Fortunatus, O.Min. (1251–1252)
- Jacobus (attested 1252–1266)

Sede vacante (1268–1274)

- Gabriel (1274–1280)

[Nicolaus]

- Robertus
- Jacobus (1299– ? )
- Venutus de Neocastro, O.Min. (attested 1305)
- Petrus Salamia O.P. (1343–1368?)
- Nicolaus Andreae (1368–1369)
- Astulf (1369–c.1398?)
- Nicolaus Roman Obedience
- Thomas (1398– ? ) Roman Obedience
- Hortensius ? (1414– ? )
- Petrus (1421–1435)
- Antonio de Ispiglo, O.F.M. (1435–1439)
- Nicola Palmerio, O.E.S.A. (1440–1448? Resigned)
- Ricardus (1448–1450)
- Palamides, O.E.S.A. (1450–1467)
- Giovanni Geraldini (1467–1488)
- Stephanus Goffredi (1489–1509)
- Evangelista Tornafranza (1509–1523)
- Antonio de Paola (1523–1529)

Cardinal Andrea della Valle (resigned 1530) Administrator

- Girolamo de Paola (1530)
- Angelo Geraldini (1532–1536)

Cardinal Alessandro Cesarini (1536 Resigned) Administrator

- Sforza Geraldini (1536–1550)
- Ascanio Girolamo Geraldini (1550–1570)
- Angelo da Aversa, O.Min.Obs. (1570–1572)
- Ottaviano Moriconi (1572–1582)
- Nicolò Orazi (1582–1607)

==== 1600 to 1956 ====
- Giuseppe Pisculli, O.F.M. Conv. (1607–1618)
- Fabrizio Caracciolo Piscizi (1619–1629 Resigned)
- Luca Castellini, O.P. (1629–1631)
- Consalvo Caputo (1633–1645)
- Fabio Olivadisi (1646–1656)
- Filippo Visconti, O.S.A. (1657–1664)
- Agazio di Somma (1664–1671)
- Carlo Sgombrino (1672–1686)
- Francesco Gori (1687–1706)
- Giovanni Matteo Vitelloni (1707–1710)
- Emanuele Spinelli d'Acquaro, C.R. (1714–1727)
- Domenico Rossi, O.S.B. (1727–1735)
- Giovanni Romano (1735–1736 Died)
- Octavio da Pozzo (1736–1751)
- Fabio Troyli (1751–1762)
- Antonio De Cumis (1763–1778)
- Salvatore Spinelli, O.S.B. (1779–1792)
- Giovanni Battista Marchese (1792–1802)
- Giovanni Francesco d'Alessandria (1805–1818)
- Michele Clari (Clary), O.S.B.I. (1818–1823)
- Emmanuele Bellorado, O.P. (1824–1828)
- Matteo Franco, C.P.O. (1829–1851)
- Raffaele de Franco (1852–1883)
- Bernardo Antonio De Riso, O.S.B. (1883–1900)
- Luigi Finoja (1900–1906 Resigned)
- Pietro di Maria (1906–1918)
- Giovanni Fiorentini (1919–1956)

=== Archdiocese of Catanzaro ===
Elevated: 5 June 1927

- Armando Fares (1956–1980 Retired)
- Antonio Cantisani (1980–2003 Retired)

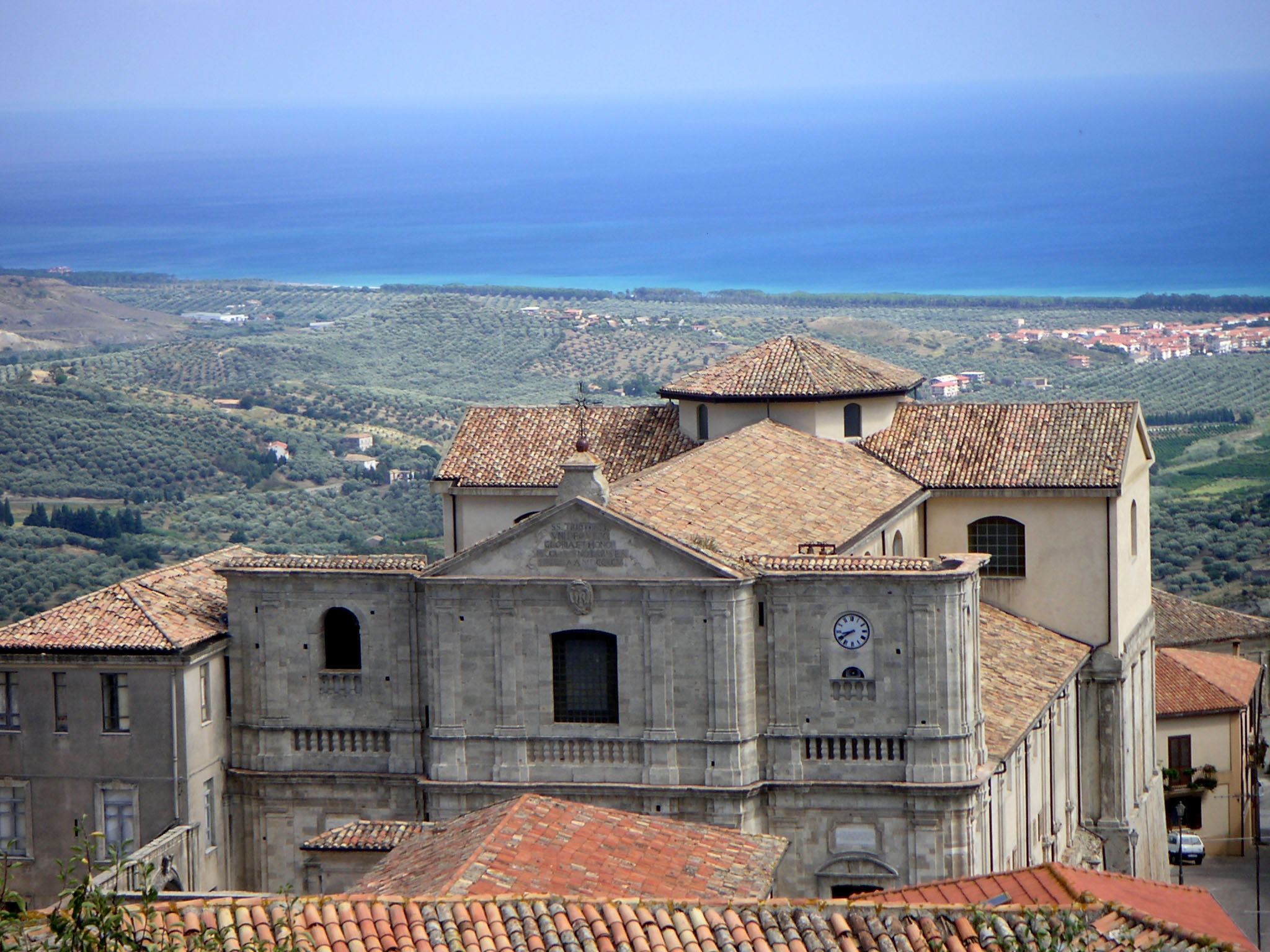
Co-cathedral in Squillace

=== Archdiocese of Catanzaro-Squillace ===
United: 30 September 1986 with the Diocese of Squillace

- Antonio Ciliberti (2003–2011 Retired)
- Vincenzo Bertolone, S.d.P. (2011–2021 Retired)
- Claudio Maniago (2021–present)

== Books ==
=== Reference works ===
- Gams, Pius Bonifatius (1873). Series episcoporum Ecclesiae catholicae: quotquot innotuerunt a beato Petro apostolo. Ratisbon: Typis et Sumptibus Georgii Josephi Manz. p. 874 (Catanzaro).
- Eubel, Conradus, ed. (1913). Hierarchia catholica, Tomus 1 (second ed.). Münster: Libreria Regensbergiana. p. 159 (Calvi); 480-481 (Teano). (in Latin)
- Eubel, Conradus, ed. (1914). Hierarchia catholica, Tomus 2 (second ed.). Münster: Libreria Regensbergiana. p. 243. (in Latin)
- Eubel, Conradus, ed. (1923). Hierarchia catholica, Tomus 3 (second ed.). Münster: Libreria Regensbergiana. p. 305. (in Latin)
- Gauchat, Patritius (Patrice) (1935). Hierarchia catholica IV (1592-1667). Münster: Libraria Regensbergiana. p. 324. (in Latin)
- Ritzler, Remigius; Sefrin, Pirminus (1952). Hierarchia catholica medii et recentis aevi V (1667-1730). Patavii: Messagero di S. Antonio. pp. 137–138 (Calvi); 373 (Teano).
- Ritzler, Remigius; Sefrin, Pirminus (1958). Hierarchia catholica medii et recentis aevi VI (1730-1799). Patavii: Messagero di S. Antonio. p. 399 (Teano).
- Ritzler, Remigius; Sefrin, Pirminus (1968). Hierarchia Catholica medii et recentioris aevi (in Latin). Vol. VII (1800–1846). Monasterii: Libreria Regensburgiana.
- Remigius Ritzler; Pirminus Sefrin (1978). Hierarchia catholica Medii et recentioris aevi (in Latin). Vol. VIII (1846–1903). Il Messaggero di S. Antonio.
- Pięta, Zenon (2002). Hierarchia catholica medii et recentioris aevi (in Latin). Vol. IX (1903–1922). Padua: Messagero di San Antonio. ISBN 978-88-250-1000-8.

=== Studies ===
- Calabretta, Leonardo (2004). Le diocesi di Squillace e Catanzaro. Cardinali, arcivescovi e vescovi nati nelle due diocesi (in Italian). Cosenza: Pellegrini Editore. ISBN 978-88-8101-229-9.
- Cantisani, Antonio (2016). Vescovi a Catanzaro (1582-1686) (in Italian). Catanzaro: La Rondine Edizioni. ISBN 978-88-99135-33-1.
- Cantisani, Antonio (2014). Vescovi a Catanzaro (1687-1791) (in Italian). Catanzaro: La Rondine Edizioni. ISBN 978-88-95418-55-1.
- Cantisani, Antonio (2012). Vescovi a Catanzaro (1792-1851) (in Italian). Catanzaro: La Rondine Edizioni. ISBN 978-88-903763-7-5.
- Cantisani, Antonio (2008). Vescovi a Catanzaro (1852-1918) (in Italian). Catanzaro: La rondine Edizioni. ISBN 978-88-95418-09-4.
- Cappelletti, Giuseppe (1870). Le chiese d'Italia dalla loro origine sino ai nostri giorni (in Italian). Vol. Tomo vigesimo primo (21). Venezia: G. Antonelli. pp. 181–186.
- D'Avino, Vincenzio (1848). Cenni storici sulle chiese arcivescovili, vescovili, e prelatizie (nullius) del regno delle due Sicilie (in Italian). Naples: dalle stampe di Ranucci.
- Kamp, Norbert (1975). Kirche und Monarchie im staufischen Königreich Sizilien: I. Prosopographische Grundlegung, Bistumer und Bistümer und Bischöfe des Konigreichs 1194–1266: 2. Apulien und Calabrien München: Wilhelm Fink 1975.
- Kehr, Paul Fridolin (1975). Italia pontificia. Vol. X: Calabria – Insulae. Berlin: Weidmann. pp. 76-84. (in Latin)
- Sinopoli, C. (1905), Memorie per servire alla storia della chiesa di Catanzaro - Serie cronologica dei vescovi. Catanzaro 1905.
- Ughelli, Ferdinando; Coleti, Niccolo (1721). Italia Sacra Sive De Episcopis Italiae, Et Insularum adiacentium (in Latin). Vol. Tomus nonus (9). Venice: Antonio Coleti. pp. 355–380.
