= Marco Antonio Franciotti =

Italian cardinal and bishop (1592–1666)

His Eminence Marco Antonio Franciotti
- Cardinal-Priest of Santa Maria della Pace
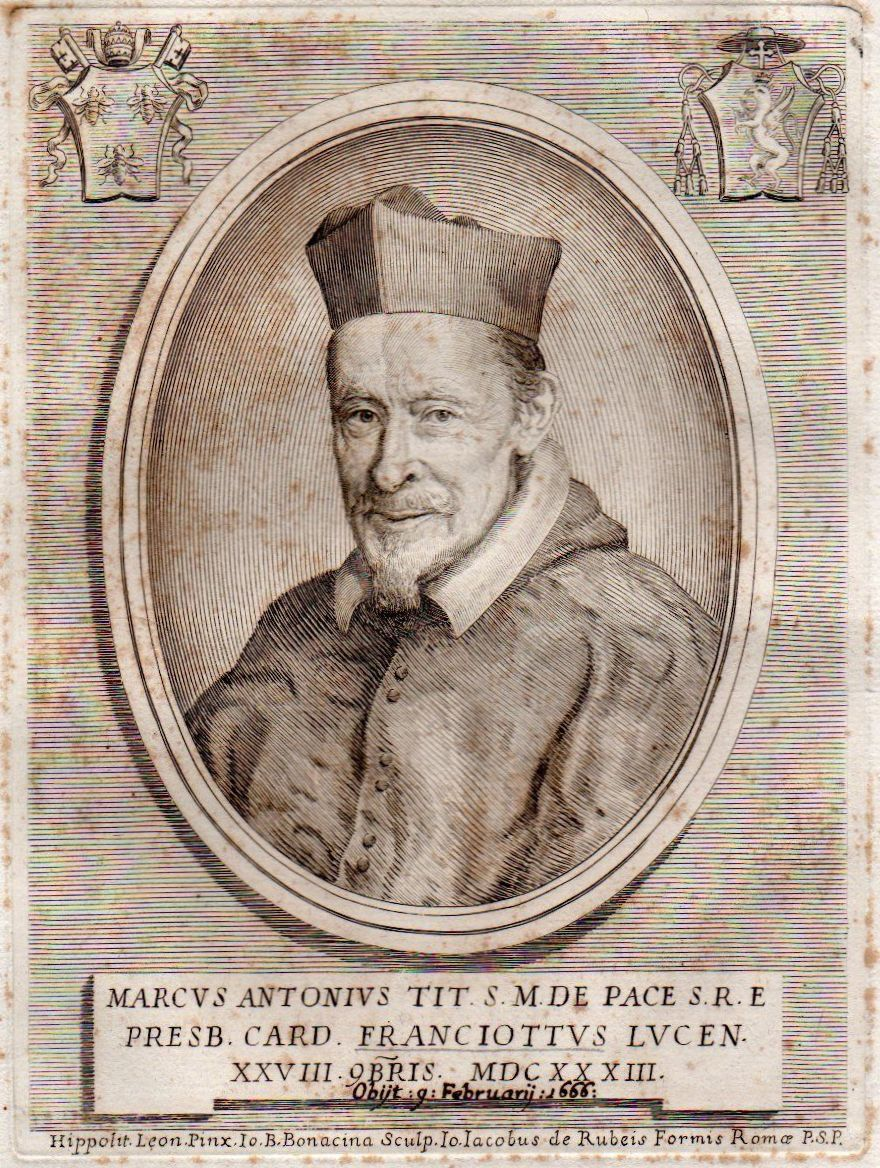
- Church: Catholic Church

Orders
- Consecration: 19 Apr 1637 by Antonio Marcello Barberini

Personal details
- Born: 1592 Lucca, Republic of Lucca
- Died: 8 February 1666 (aged 73–74) Rome, Papal States

Marco Antonio Franciotti (1592 – 8 February 1666) was an Italian Catholic Cardinal and Bishop of Lucca.

== Early life ==
Franciotti was born in 1592 in Lucca, Tuscany, the son of Curzio Franciotti.

He was educated at the University of Bologna where he studied law. Thereafter, he went to Rome and became a papal prelate and was employed by Giambattista Spada. He was appointed Protonotary apostolic participantium in 1619. In 1622, Franciotti was made Governor of Faenza and then Fabriano and general auditor of the Apostolic Chamber the following year. He was promoted to cleric of the Apostolic Chamber in 1626 and was named Prefect of the Annona in 1627 (a honorific title maintained by the church in the same vein as that of Praefectus annonae in Ancient Rome). He was promoted again to Auditor General of the Apostolic Chamber and held the position for 8 years; between 1629 and 1637.

== Cardinalate ==
Franciotti was actually elevated to cardinal by Pope Urban VIII in November 1633 but the elevation was reserved in pectore tacite and was only published in the consistory of 30 March 1637 when Franciotti was appointed Bishop of Lucca; his home city. Franciotti was consecrated a month later, on 19 April 1637 at the Quirinale Palace by Antonio Marcello Barberini, Cardinal-Priest of Sant'Onofrio, with Faustus Poli, Titular Archbishop of Amasea, and Antonio Severoli, Archbishop of Dubrovnik, serving as co-consecrators.

== Conflict in Lucca ==
Contemporary, John Bargrave, provided further insight into Franciotti's activities as Cardinal-Bishop of Lucca and those of his brother, one of the governors of Lucca. According to Bargrave, Franciotti's brother had taken up arms against the other princes of Lucca; being armed inside city walls was expressly forbidden by city law. City officials searched the houses of those suspected of being involved and found large numbers of weapons and were, at the same time, made aware of plots against the city government led by Franciotti's brother. Franciotti's brother and a number of others were arrested and prosecuted.

With his brother sentenced to death, Franciotti rushed to Rome and sought an audience with Pope Urban. Rather than give a proper account of the events leading to his brother's arrest, Franciotti told the Pope that city officials had taken issue with his conduct as Bishop and that the armed men had been employed for the protection of his own episcopal residence. Pope Urban believed his Cardinal and sent letters to Lucca demanding that Franciotti's brother be released. The city refused and the Pope excommunicated those he believed responsible for the slight and ordered that all the churches in the city be closed. City officials wrote numerous letters to church and secular officials alike but were not given permission to reopen their churches until they had come to a resolution with Cardinal Franciotti.

It is unclear if Franciotti's brother was ever executed but Franciotti resigned as Bishop of Lucca in 1645.

== Later life and death ==
Franciotti participated in the conclave of 1644 which elected Pope Innocent X. He was appointed Camerlengo of the Sacred College of Cardinals between 1650 and 1651 and participated in the conclave of 1655 which elected Pope Alexander VII.

Franciotti died on 8 February 1666 in Rome.

== Episcopal succession ==
Episcopal succession of Marco Antonio Franciotti

While bishop, he was the principal consecrator of:

- Giuseppe Ciantes, Bishop of Marsico Nuovo (1640);
- Giambattista Spada, Titular Patriarch of Constantinople (1643);
- Didier Palleti, Bishop of Nice (1644);
- Francesco Angelo Rapaccioli, Bishop of Terni (1646);
- Caesar Reghini, Bishop of Sarsina (1646);
- Pompeo Mignucci, Archbishop of Dubrovnik (1647);
- Giulio Cesare Borea, Bishop of Comacchio (1649);
- Stefano Quaranta, Archbishop of Amalfi (1649);
- Vincenzo Rabatta, Archbishop of Chieti (1650);
- Giovanni Battista Alfieri, Bishop of Fano (1650);
- Carlo Azzolini, Bishop of Bagnoregio (1650);
- Pietro Rota, Bishop of Lucca (1650);
- Leonardo Severoli, Bishop of San Severo (1650);
- Alessandro Porro, Bishop of Bobbio (1650);
- Ercole Coppola, Bishop of Nicotera (1651);
- Antonio Leoncillo, Bishop of Termoli (1651);
- Girolamo Buonvisi, Titular Archbishop of Laodicea in Phrygia (1651);
- Gabriel Ortiz de Orbé, Bishop of Gaeta (1651);
- Alessandro Argoli, Bishop of Veroli (1651);
- Thomas Tomassoni, Bishop of Umbriatico (1652);
- Sallustio Cherubini, Bishop of Città Ducale (1652);
- Rodrigo Cruzado Caballero, Titular Bishop of Usula and Auxiliary Bishop of Cuenca (1652);
- Teodoro Fantoni, Bishop of San Marco (1652);
- Giovanni Alfonso Puccinelli, Archbishop of Manfredonia (1652);
- Giuseppe Boncore, Bishop of Lavello (1652);
- Giorgio Giorgicci, Bishop of Nona (1652);
- Theodorus Skuminowicz, Titular Bishop of Gratianopolis and Auxiliary Bishop of Vilnius (1652);
- Filippo Jacobio, Bishop of Policastro (1652);
- Martino Denti de' Cipriani, Bishop of Strongoli (1652);
- Antonio Pignatelli del Rastrello, Titular Archbishop of Larissa in Thessalia (1652);
- Girolamo Borghese, Bishop of Sovana (1652);
- Carlo Sgombrino, Bishop of Belcastro (1652);
- Gerolamo Bollini, Bishop of Isernia (1653);
- Giovanni Granafei, Bishop of Alessano (1653);
- Annibale Sillano, Bishop of Castro di Puglia (1653);
- Giovanni Battista Imperiali, Bishop of Aleria (1653);
- Francesco Gozzadini, Bishop of Cefalonia e Zante (1654);
- Gian Antonio Paravicini, Archbishop of Santa Severina (1654);
- Agostino Franciotti, Titular Archbishop of Trapezus (1654);
- Mauro Promontorio, Bishop of Ventimiglia (1654);
- Giovanni Mastelloni, Bishop of Vieste (1654);
- Pietro Frescobaldi, Bishop of San Miniato (1654);
- Paolo Squillanti, Bishop of Teano (1654);
- Marco Crisio, Archbishop of Bar (1655);
- Paolo Piromalli, Archbishop of Nachitschewan (1655);
- Paolo Vincenzo Rovero, Bishop of Asti (1655);
- Pierre Parcevich, Titular Bishop of Marcianopolis (1656);
- Giuseppe Petagna, Bishop of Caiazzo (1657);
- Giovanni Battista Repucci, Bishop of Vico Equense (1657);
- Gianlucido Palombara, Bishop of Pesaro (1658);
- Cesare Cancellotti, Bishop of Bisceglie (1658);
- Agazio di Somma, Bishop of Cariati e Cerenzia (1659);
- Marzio Marini, Bishop of Sagone (1659);
- Niccolò Radulovich, Archbishop of Chieti (1659);
- Luis Morales (bishop), Bishop of Ariano (1659);
- Francesco de Estrada, Archbishop of Brindisi (1659);
- Attilio Pietrasanta, Bishop of Vigevano (1659);
- Lorenzo Díaz de Encinas, Bishop of Ugento (1659);
- Maurizio Piccardi, Bishop of Sora (1660);
- Vincenzo Lanfranchi, Bishop of Trivento (1660); and
- Filippo de Monti, Bishop of Teramo (1666).

== See also ==
- Catholic Church in Italy

Catholic Church titles
Preceded by Alessandro Guidiccioni (iuniore)	Bishop of Lucca; 1637–1645	Succeeded by Giavanbattista Rainoldi
Preceded by Giovanni Domenico Spinola	Cardinal-Priest of San Clemente; 1637–1639	Succeeded by Vincenzo Maculani
Preceded by Fabrizio Verospi	Cardinal-Priest of Santa Maria della Pace; 1639–1666	Succeeded by Giacomo Filippo Nini
