= Francesco Nerli (iuniore) =

Italian cardinal

His Eminence Francesco Nerli
- Cardinal-Priest of San Lorenzo in Lucina; Archpriest of the Basilica di San Pietro in Vaticano
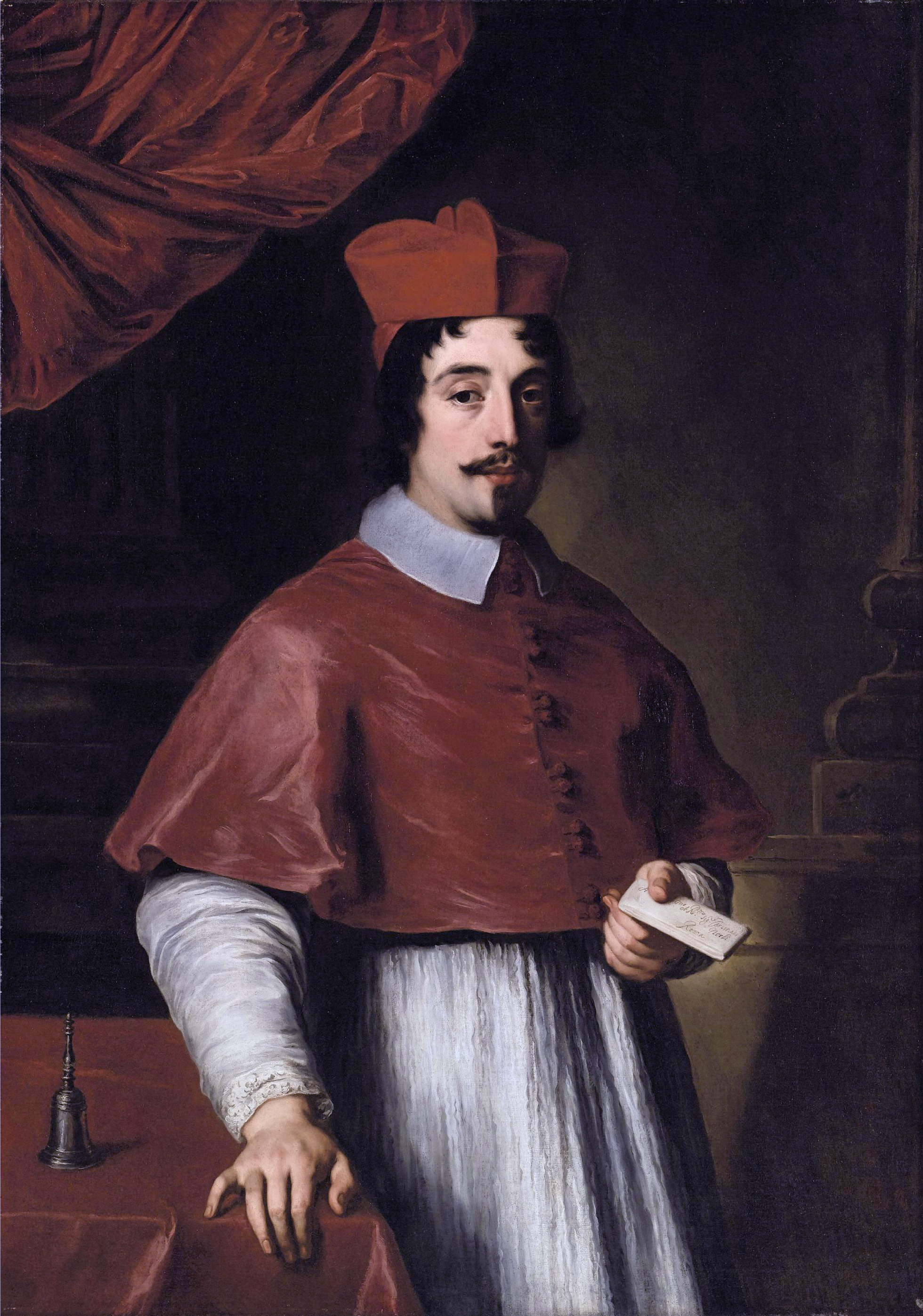
- Portrait by Jacob Ferdinand Voet
- Church: Catholic Church

Orders
- Consecration: 6 Jul 1670 by Carlo Carafa della Spina

Personal details
- Born: 12 Jun 1636 Rome, Papal States
- Died: 8 Apr 1708 (age 71) Rome, Papal States
- Coat of arms

Francesco Nerli, iuniore (12 June 1636 – 8 April 1708) was a Roman Catholic cardinal.

== Biography ==
On 6 Jul 1670, he was consecrated bishop by Carlo Carafa della Spina, Cardinal-Priest of Santa Susanna, with Giambattista Spínola (seniore), Archbishop of Genoa, and Federico Baldeschi Colonna, Titular Archbishop of Caesarea in Cappadocia, serving as co-consecrators.

== Episcopal succession ==
Episcopal succession of Francesco Nerli, iuniore

While bishop, he was the principal consecrator of:

- Pietro Alberini, Titular Archbishop of Nicomedi and Apostolic Nuncio to Savoy (1674);
- Muzio Soriano, Archbishop of Santa Severina (1674);
- Vincenzo Ragni, Bishop of Oppido Mamertina (1674);
- Filippo Neri degli Altoviti, Bishop of Fiesole (1675);
- Giovanni Vespoli-Casanatte, Bishop of Ortona a Mare e Campli (1675);
- Riccardo Annibaleschi della Molara, Bishop of Veroli (1675);
- Francesco Martelli, Titular Archbishop of Corinthus and Apostolic Nuncio to Poland (1675);
- Thomas de Castro, Titular Bishop of Fussala and Vicar Apostolic of Malabar (1675);
- Gregorio Giuseppe Gaetani de Aragonia, Titular Archbishop of Neocaesarea in Ponto and Apostolic Nuncio to Florence (1676);
- Giovan Donato Giannoni Alitto, Bishop of Ruvo (1680);
- Girolamo Prignano, Bishop of Satriano e Campagna (1680);
- Giovan Giorgio Mainardi, Bishop of Ripatransone (1680);
- Giuseppe Ottavio Attavanti, Bishop of Arezzo (1683);
- Michele Carlo Visdomini Cortigiani, Bishop of San Miniato (1683);
- Antonio Francesco Roberti, Archbishop of Urbino (1685);
- Giovanni Girolamo Naselli, Bishop of Ventimiglia (1685);
- Francesco Antonio Giannone, Bishop of Boiano (1685);
- Lorenzo Casoni, Titular Archbishop of Caesarea in Cappadocia and Apostolic Nuncio to Naples (1690);
- Nicolò Acciaioli, Cardinal-Bishop of Frascati (1693); and
- Domenico Folgori, Titular Archbishop of Nazareth (1695).

== External links and additional sources ==
- Cheney, David M. "Nunciature to France". Catholic-Hierarchy.org. (for Chronology of Bishops) ^{[self-published]}
- Chow, Gabriel. "Apostolic Nunciature France". GCatholic.org. (for Chronology of Bishops) ^{[self-published]}

Catholic Church titles
Preceded by Stefano Brancaccio	Titular Archbishop of Hadrianopolis in Haemimonto; 1670	Succeeded by Pompeo Varese
Preceded by Galeazzo Marescotti	Apostolic Nuncio to Poland; 1670–1671	Succeeded by Angelo Maria Ranuzzi
Preceded by Michele Antonio Vibò	Apostolic Nuncio to France; 1672–1673	Succeeded by Fabrizio Spada
Preceded by Francesco Maria Mancini	Cardinal-Priest of San Matteo in Merulana; 1673–1704	Succeeded by Nicola Grimaldi
Preceded by Federico Borromeo (iuniore)	Cardinal Secretary of State; 1673–1676	Succeeded by Alderano Cybo
Preceded by Francesco Nerli (seniore)	Archbishop of Florence; 1670–1682	Succeeded by Giacomo Antonio Morigia
Preceded by Ludovicus Giustiniani	Archbishop (Personal Title) of Assisi; 1685–1689	Succeeded by Carolus Salvatori
Preceded by Carlo Barberini	Archpriest of the Basilica di San Pietro in Vaticano; 1704–1708	Succeeded by Annibale Albani
Preceded by Carlo Barberini	Cardinal-Priest of San Lorenzo in Lucina; 1704–1708	Succeeded by Galeazzo Marescotti
