= Giambattista Spada =

Roman Catholic cardinal

His Eminence Giambattista Spada
- Cardinal-Priest of San Crisogono
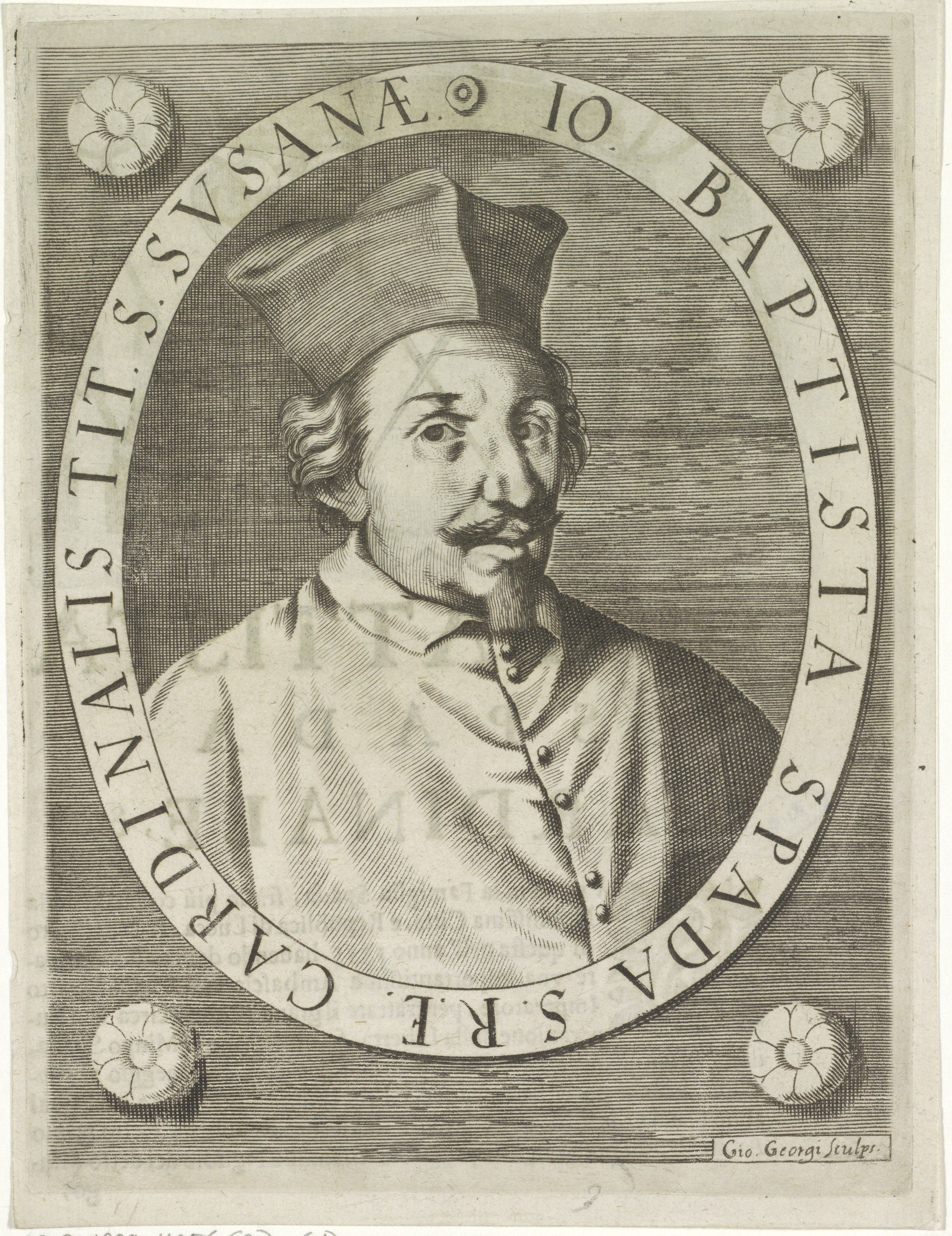
- Church: Catholic Church

Orders
- Consecration: 23 August 1643 by Marcantonio Franciotti

Personal details
- Born: 28 August 1597 Lyon, France
- Died: 23 January 1675 (age 77) Rome, Italy

Giambattista Spada or Giovanni Battista Spada (28 August 1597 – 23 January 1675) was a Roman Catholic cardinal.

== Biography ==
On 23 August 1643, he was consecrated bishop by Marcantonio Franciotti, Bishop of Lucca, with Ranuccio Scotti Douglas, Bishop of Borgo San Donnino, and Giovanni Battista Scanaroli, Titular Bishop of Sidon, serving as co-consecrators.

== Episcopal succession ==
Episcopal succession of Giambattista Spada

While bishop, he was the principal consecrator of:

- Francesco Antonio De Luca, Bishop of Anglona-Tursi (1654);
- Carlo Pio di Savoia, Bishop of Ferrara (1655);
- Paolo Suardo, Archbishop of Sorrento (1659);
- Anselmo Dandini, Bishop of Cervia (1662);
- Carlo Spinola, Archbishop of Rossano (1664);
- Fabio Guinigi, Archbishop of Ravenna (1674);
- Vincenzo Bonifacio, Titular Bishop of Famagusta (1674);

and the principal co-consecrator of:

- Ercole Coppola, Bishop of Nicotera (1651);
- Girolamo Buonvisi, Titular Archbishop of Laodicea in Phrygia (1651);
- Gabriel Ortiz de Orbé, Bishop of Gaeta (1651);
- Alessandro Argoli, Bishop of Veroli (1651);
- Giovanni Alfonso Puccinelli, Archbishop of Manfredonia (1652);
- Giuseppe Boncore, Bishop of Lavello (1652);
- Alfonso Michele Litta, Archbishop of Milan (1652);
- Marcello Santacroce, Bishop of Tivoli (1652);
- Gerolamo Bollini, Bishop of Isernia (1653);
- Giovanni Granafei, Bishop of Alessano (1653);
- Marzio Ginetti, Cardinal-Bishop of Albano (1653);
- Annibale Sillano, Bishop of Castro di Puglia (1653).

Catholic Church titles
| Preceded by Giovanni Giacomo Panciroli | Titular Patriarch of Constantinople; 1643–1654 | Succeeded by Volumnio Bandinelli |
| Preceded by Giulio Cesare Sacchetti | Cardinal-Priest of Santa Susanna; 1654–1659 | Succeeded by Carlo Carafa della Spina |
| Preceded by Camillo Melzi | Cardinal-Priest of San Marcello; 1659–1673 | Succeeded by Federico Baldeschi Colonna |
| Preceded by Lorenzo Imperiali | Cardinal-Priest of San Crisogono; 1673–1675 | Succeeded by Carlo Pio di Savoia |
