= Giuseppe Eusanio =

Most Reverend Giuseppe Eusanio
- Titular Bishop of Porphyreon
- Church: Catholic Church
- Predecessor: Honuphrius Ippoliti
- Successor: Pierre Lambert Ledrou
- Previous post: Titular Bishop of Helenopolis in Bithynia (1669–1670)

Orders
- Consecration: 4 May 1670 by Giacomo Franzoni

Personal details
- Born: 1619 Prata d'Ansidonia, Italy
- Died: 23 April 1692 (age 73)

Giuseppe Eusanio (1619 – 23 April 1692) was a Roman Catholic prelate who served as Titular Bishop of Porphyreon (1672–1692) and Titular Bishop of Helenopolis in Bithynia (1669–1670).

== Biography ==
Giuseppe Eusanio was born in Prata d'Ansidonia, Italy in 1619 and ordained a priest in the Order of Saint Augustine. On 2 December 1669, he was appointed during the papacy of Pope Clement IX as Titular Bishop of Helenopolis in Bithynia. On 4 May 1670, he was consecrated bishop by Giacomo Franzoni, Bishop of Camerino, with Giambattista Spínola, Archbishop of Genoa, and Francesco Maria Febei, Titular Archbishop of Tarsus serving as co-consecrators. On 2 May 1672, he was appointed during the papacy of Pope Clement X as Titular Bishop of Porphyreon. He served as Titular Bishop of Porphyreon until his death on 23 April 1692.

== Episcopal succession ==
Episcopal succession of Giuseppe Eusanio

While bishop, he was the principal co-consecrator of:

- Pietro Alberini, Titular Archbishop of Nicomedia (1674);
- Muzio Soriano, Archbishop of Santa Severina (1674);
- Vincenzo Ragni, Bishop of Oppido Mamertina (1674);
- Agostino Isimbardi, Bishop of Cremona (1676);
- Girolamo Orsaja, Archbishop of Rossano (1676);
- Domenico Valvassori, Bishop of Gravina (di Puglia) (1686);
- François Genet, Bishop of Vaison (1686); and
- Paolo Naldini (bishop), Bishop of Capodistria (1686).

== External links and additional sources ==
- Cheney, David M. "Helenopolis in Bithynia (Titular See)". Catholic-Hierarchy.org. (for Chronology of Bishops) ^{[self-published]}
- Chow, Gabriel. "Titular Episcopal See of Helenopolis in Bithynia (Turkey)". GCatholic.org. (for Chronology of Bishops) ^{[self-published]}
- Cheney, David M. "Porphyreon (Titular See)". Catholic-Hierarchy.org. (for Chronology of Bishops) ^{[self-published]}
- Chow, Gabriel. "Titular Episcopal See of Porphyreon (Israel)". GCatholic.org. (for Chronology of Bishops) ^{[self-published]}

Catholic Church titles
Preceded by Jean Louis Bertier	Titular Bishop of Helenopolis in Bithynia; 1669–1670	Succeeded by Philip Thomas Howard of Norfolk
Preceded by Honuphrius Ippoliti	Titular Bishop of Porphyreon; 1670–1687	Succeeded by Pierre Lambert Ledrou
