= Girolamo Buonvisi =

Italian Catholic cardinal

His Eminence Girolamo Buonvisi
- Cardinal-Priest of San Girolamo dei Croati
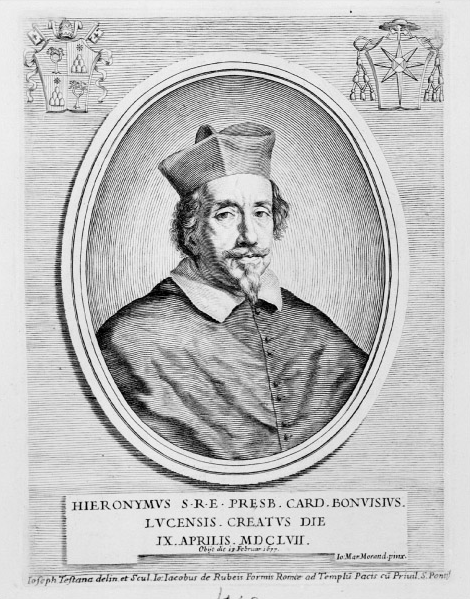
- Church: Catholic Church

Orders
- Consecration: 30 Jul 1651 by Marcantonio Franciotti

Personal details
- Born: 12 May 1607 Lucca, Italy
- Died: 21 Feb 1677 (age 69)

Girolamo Buonvisi (1607–1677) was a Roman Catholic Cardinal.

== Biography ==
On 30 Jul 1651, he was consecrated bishop by Marcantonio Franciotti, Cardinal-Priest of Santa Maria della Pace, with Giambattista Spada, Titular Patriarch of Constantinople, and Carlo Carafa della Spina, Bishop of Aversa, serving as co-consecrators.

== Episcopal succession ==
While bishop, he was the principal co-consecrator of:

- Giacomo Giordano, Bishop of Lacedonia (1651);
- Gabriel Ortiz de Orbé, Bishop of Gaeta (1651); and
- Alessandro Argoli, Bishop of Veroli (1651).

Catholic Church titles
Preceded by Wojciech Lipnicki	Titular Archbishop of Laodicea in Phrygia; 1651–1657	Succeeded by Giulio Spinola
Preceded by Francesco Peretti di Montalto	Cardinal-Priest of San Girolamo dei Croati; 1657–1677	Succeeded by Giovanni Battista de Luca
Preceded by Pietro Rota (bishop)	Archbishop (Personal Title) of Lucca; 1657–1677	Succeeded by Giulio Spinola
