= Pietro Alberini =

Italian Roman Catholic prelate (1625–1679)

Most Reverend Pietro Alberini
- Titular Archbishop of Nicomedia
- Church: Catholic Church
- In office: 1674–1679
- Predecessor: Antonio Neto dos Santos
- Successor: Lorenzo Corsini

Orders
- Consecration: 4 March 1674 by Francesco Nerli (iuniore)

Personal details
- Born: 1625 Rome, Italy
- Died: 9 July 1679 (age 54)

Pietro Alberini (1625 – 9 July 1679) was a Roman Catholic prelate who served as Titular Archbishop of Nicomedia (1674–1679) and Apostolic Nuncio to Savoy (1674–1675).

== Biography ==
Pietro Alberini was born in Rome, Italy in 1625. On 15 January 1674, he was appointed during the papacy of Pope Clement X as Titular Archbishop of Nicomedia. On 4 March 1674, he was consecrated bishop by Francesco Nerli (iuniore), Archbishop of Florence with Francesco Boccapaduli, Bishop Emeritus of Città di Castello, and Giuseppe Eusanio, Titular Bishop of Porphyreon serving as co-consecrators. On 4 March 1674, he was appointed during the papacy of Pope Clement X as Apostolic Nuncio to Savoy where he served until his resignation in Nov 1675. He served as Titular Archbishop of Nicomedia until his death on 9 July 1679.

== See also ==
- Catholic Church in Italy

== External links and additional sources ==
- Cheney, David M. "Nicomedia (Titular See)". Catholic-Hierarchy.org. (for Chronology of Bishops) ^{[self-published]}
- Chow, Gabriel. "Titular Metropolitan See of Nicomedia (Turkey)". GCatholic.org. (for Chronology of Bishops) ^{[self-published]}
- Cheney, David M. "Nunciature to Savoy". Catholic-Hierarchy.org. (for Chronology of Bishops) ^{[self-published]}

Catholic Church titles
Preceded by Fabrizio Spada	Apostolic Nuncio to Savoy; 1674–1675	Succeeded by Giuseppe Mosti
Preceded by Antonio Neto dos Santos	Titular Archbishop of Nicomedia; 1674–1679	Succeeded by Lorenzo Corsini
