= Pietro Rota (bishop of Lucca) =

Most Reverend Pietro Rota
- Bishop of Lucca
- Church: Catholic Church
- Diocese: Diocese of Lucca
- In office: 1650–1657
- Predecessor: Giavanbattista Rainoldi
- Successor: Girolamo Buonvisi

Orders
- Consecration: 3 July 1650 by Marcantonio Franciotti

Personal details
- Born: 1600 Ravenna, Italy
- Died: 12 February 1657 (age 57) Lucca, Italy

Pietro Rota (1600 – 12 February 1657) was a Roman Catholic prelate who served as Bishop of Lucca (1650–1657).

== Biography ==
Pietro Rota was born in Ravenna, Italy in 1600. On 27 June 1650, he was appointed during the papacy of Pope Innocent X as Bishop of Lucca. On 3 July 1650, he was consecrated bishop by Marcantonio Franciotti, Cardinal-Priest of Santa Maria della Pace, with Luca Torreggiani, Archbishop of Ravenna, and Ranuccio Scotti Douglas, Bishop Emeritus of Borgo San Donnino, serving as co-consecrators. He served as Bishop of Lucca until his death on 12 February 1657.

Catholic Church titles
Preceded by Giavanbattista Rainoldi	Bishop of Lucca; 1650–1657	Succeeded by Girolamo Buonvisi
