= Carmelo Pujia =

Carmelo Pujia may refer to:

- Carmelo Pujia (bishop)
- Carmelo Pujia (politician)
