= Jacobus Wemmers =

Most Reverend Jacobus Wemmers
- Titular Bishop of Memphis
- Church: Catholic Church
- In office: 1645
- Successor: Francisco Suárez de Villegas

Orders
- Consecration: 24 April 1645 by Jerónimo Domín Funes

Personal details
- Born: 21 October 1598 Antwerp, Duchy of Brabant, Spanish Netherlands
- Died: 21 August 1645 (aged 46) Naples, Kingdom of Naples

Jacobus Wemmers (1598–1645) was a Carmelite friar who served as apostolic legate to Ethiopia, and briefly bore the title of Titular Bishop of Memphis (1645).

== Biography ==
Jacobus Wemmers was born in Antwerp, Duchy of Brabant (now Belgium), on 21 October 1598, the son of Gisbert Wemmers and Marie Hanotel. He entered the Carmelite Order on 22 September 1616, and made his vows on 25 of September the following year. He showed a love of learning, and obtained a doctorate in theology.

On 3 May 1640 Pope Urban VIII appointed him apostolic legate to Ethiopia, with faculties to use the Ethiopian liturgical rite.

He was appointed Titular Bishop of Memphis on 24 April 1645, in the pontificate of Pope Innocent X, and on 5 June was consecrated bishop by Jerónimo Domín Funes, Bishop of Gaeta, with Placido Padiglia, Bishop of Alessano, and Francesco de' Notari, Bishop of Lavello, serving as co-consecrators.

He died in Naples on 21 August 1645 ("the 12th of the calends of September"), while en route to Ethiopia. He was buried in Santa Maria del Carmine, Naples, with an epitaph reading

D.O.M. Illustrissimus ac Reverendissimus Dom Fr. Jacobus Wemmers, Antverpiensis Carmelita, Mempheos Episcopus, scientiis, moribusque præclarus: gregem ardens maximè, ardores minimi facit æstivos: pro Ægypto cælum appellit: & qui Ecclesiæ multa scripsit, huic Ecclesiæ adscripsit ossa XII. kalendas septembris, anno Domini M.DC.XLV.

== Works ==
- Lexicon Aethiopicum (Rome, Sacred Congregation for the Propagation of the Faith, 1638).

== External links and additional sources ==
- Cheney, David M. "Memphis (Titular See)". Catholic-Hierarchy.org. (for Chronology of Bishops) ^{[self-published]}
- Chow, Gabriel. "Titular Episcopal See of Memphis (Egypt)". GCatholic.org. (for Chronology of Bishops) ^{[self-published]}

Catholic Church titles
Preceded by	Titular Bishop of Memphis; 1645	Succeeded by Francisco Suárez de Villegas
