= Federico Borromeo (iuniore) =

Italian cardinal

His Eminence Federico Borromeo
- Cardinal Secretary of State
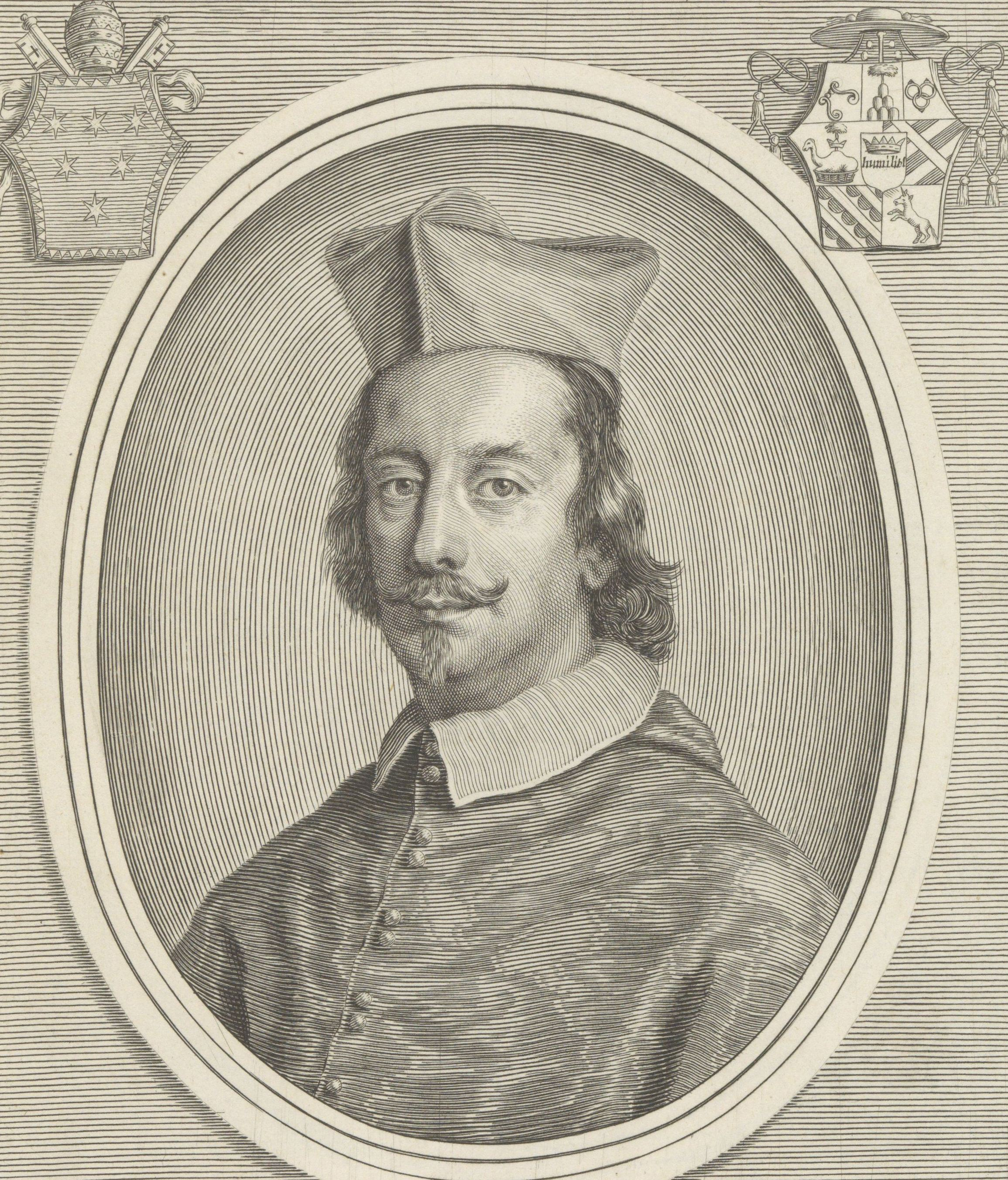
- Church: Roman Catholic Church
- Appointed: May 1670
- Term ended: 18 February 1673
- Other post: Cardinal-Priest of Sant'Agnese fuori le mura

Orders
- Consecration: 30 Nov 1654 by Francesco Peretti di Montalto
- Created cardinal: 22 December 1670 by Clement X

Personal details
- Born: 29 May 1617 Milan, Duchy of Milan
- Died: 18 Feb 1673 (age 55) Rome, Papal States

Federico Borromeo, iuniore (29 May 1617 – 18 February 1673) was a Roman Catholic cardinal.

== Biography ==
On 30 Nov 1654, he was consecrated bishop by Francesco Peretti di Montalto, Archbishop of Monreale, with Giovan Battista Foppa, Archbishop of Benevento, and Giovanni Battista Scanaroli, Titular Bishop of Sidon, serving as co-consecrators.

== Episcopal succession ==
Episcopal succession of Federico Borromeo, iuniore

While bishop, he was the principal consecrator of:

- Johann Konrad von Roggenbach, Bishop of Basel (1659);
- Ulrich de Mont, Bishop of Chur (1662);
- Juan Asensio Barrios, Bishop of Lugo (1670);
- Mario Alberizzi, Titular Archbishop of Neocaesarea in Ponto and Apostolic Nuncio to Emperor (1671);
- Pompeo Varese, Titular Archbishop of Hadrianopolis in Haemimonto (1671);
- Giovanni Rasino, Bishop of Vigevano (1671);
- Tommaso de Franchi, Bishop of Melfi e Rapolla (1671);
- Francesco Maria Neri, Bishop of Massa Lubrense (1672);

and the principal co-consecrator of:

- Giannicolò Conti, Bishop of Ancona e Numana (1666).

Catholic Church titles
Preceded by Honoratus Caetani	Titular Patriarch of Alexandria; 1654–1671	Succeeded by Alessandro Crescenzi (cardinal)
Preceded by Carlo Carafa della Spina	Apostolic Nuncio to Switzerland; 1654–1665	Succeeded by Federico Baldeschi Colonna
Preceded by Vitaliano Visconti	Apostolic Nuncio to Spain; 1668–1670	Succeeded by Antonio de Benavides y Bazán
Preceded by Decio Azzolini (iuniore)	Cardinal Secretary of State; 1670–1673	Succeeded by Francesco Nerli (iuniore)
Preceded by Antonio Bichi	Cardinal-Priest of Sant'Agostino; 1671–1672	Succeeded by Lorenzo Brancati di Lauria
Preceded by Vitaliano Visconti	Cardinal-Priest of Sant'Agnese fuori le mura 1672–1673	Succeeded by Toussaint de Forbin de Janson
