= Gerolamo Bollini =

Italian Roman Catholic prelate

Most Reverend Gerolamo Bollini
- Bishop of Narni
- Church: Catholic Church
- Diocese: Diocese of Isernia
- In office: 1653–1660
- Predecessor: Pietro Paolo de' Rustici
- Successor: Tiburzio Bollini

Orders
- Consecration: 22 June 1653 by Marcantonio Franciotti

Personal details
- Born: 1593 Rome
- Died: 1660 (age 67) Isernia, Italy

Gerolamo Bollini (1593–1660) was a Roman Catholic prelate who served as Bishop of Isernia (1653–1660).

== Biography ==
Gerolamo Bollini was born in Rome, Italy in 1593 and ordained a priest in the Order of Saint Benedict. On 9 June 1653, he was appointed during the papacy of Pope Innocent X as Bishop of Isernia. On 22 June 1653, he was consecrated bishop by Marcantonio Franciotti, Cardinal-Priest of Santa Maria della Pace, with Giambattista Spada, Titular Patriarch of Constantinople, and Ranuccio Scotti Douglas, Bishop Emeritus of Borgo San Donnino, serving as co-consecrators. He served as Bishop of Isernia until his death in 1660. While bishop, he was the principal co-consecrator of Giuseppe Battaglia, Bishop of Montemarano (1657).

== See also ==
- Catholic Church in Italy

== External links and additional sources ==
- Cheney, David M. "Diocese of Isernia-Venafro". Catholic-Hierarchy.org. (for Chronology of Bishops) ^{[self-published]}
- Chow, Gabriel. "Diocese of Isernia-Venafro (Italy)". GCatholic.org. (for Chronology of Bishops) ^{[self-published]}

Catholic Church titles
| Preceded by Pietro Paolo de' Rustici | Bishop of Isernia; 1653–1660 | Succeeded by Tiburzio Bollini |
