= Carlo Carafa della Spina =

Italian Roman Catholic cardinal

His Eminence Carlo Carafa della Spina
- Cardinal-Priest of Santa Maria in Via
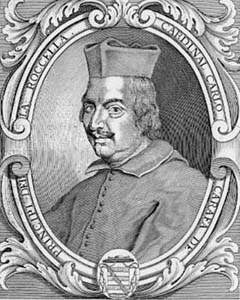
- Church: Catholic Church

Orders
- Consecration: 1 Jan 1645 by Ciriaco Rocci

Personal details
- Born: 21 Apr 1611 Rome, Italy
- Died: 23 Jan 1675 (age 77) Rome, Italy

Carlo Carafa della Spina (1611–1680) was a Roman Catholic cardinal.

== Biography ==
On 1 Jan 1645, he was consecrated bishop by Ciriaco Rocci, Cardinal-Priest of San Salvatore in Lauro, with Fabio Lagonissa, Titular Patriarch of Antioch, and Alfonso Gonzaga, Titular Archbishop of Rhodus, serving as co-consecrators.

== Episcopal succession ==
Episcopal succession of Carlo Carafa della Spina

While bishop, he was the principal consecrator of:

- Jost Knab, Bishop of Lausanne (1654);
- Giovanni Delfino (iuniore), Titular Archbishop of Thagaste and Coadjutor Patriarch of Aquileia (1656);
- Paul de Tauris-Jancic, Bishop of Pedena (1663);
- Lorenzo Astiria, Bishop of Malta (1670);
- Francesco Buonvisi, Titular Archbishop of Thessalonica and Apostolic Nuncio to Germany (1670);
- Francesco Nerli (iuniore), Titular Archbishop of Hadrianopolis in Haemimonto (1670);
- Giuseppe Cigala, Bishop of Mazara del Vallo (1670);
- Giovanni Battista Paterio, Bishop of Andros (1672);
- Gerolamo Rocca, Bishop of Ischia (1672);
- Francesco Antonio Gallo, Bishop of Bitonto (1672);
- Onofrio Manesi, Bishop of Bisignano (1672);
- Francesco Antonio Carafa, Archbishop of Lanciano (1675);
- Carlo della Palma, Bishop of Pozzuoli (1675);

and the principal co-consecrator of:

- Giovanni de Torres, Titular Archbishop of Hadrianopolis in Haemimonto and Apostolic Nuncio to Poland (1645);
- Girolamo Buonvisi, Titular Archbishop of Laodicea in Phrygia (1651);
- Girolamo Boncompagni, Archbishop of Bologna (1652);
- Alfonso Michele Litta, Archbishop of Milan (1652);
- Calanio della Ciaja, Bishop of Nardò (1652);
- Lodovico Betti, Bishop of Osimo (1652);
- Francesco Gaetano, Titular Archbishop of Rhodus and Apostolic Nuncio to Spain (1652);
- Neri Corsini, Titular Archbishop of Tamiathis (1652);
- Giantommaso Gastaldi, Bishop of Brugnato (1652); and
- Francisco de Rojas-Borja y Artés, Archbishop of Tarragona (1653).

Catholic Church titles
Preceded by Carlo Carafa	Bishop of Aversa; 1644–1665	Succeeded by Paolo Carafa
Preceded by Jost Knab	Apostolic Nuncio to Switzerland; 1653–1654	Succeeded by Federico Borromeo (iuniore)
Preceded by Francesco Boccapaduli	Apostolic Nuncio to Venice; 1654–1658	Succeeded by Giacomo Altoviti
Preceded by Scipione Pannocchieschi d'Elci	Apostolic Nuncio to Emperor; 1658–1664	Succeeded by Giulio Spinola
Preceded by Giambattista Spada	Cardinal-Priest of Santa Susanna; 1664–1675	Succeeded by Bernhard Gustav von Baden-Durlach
Preceded by César d'Estrées	Cardinal-Priest of Santa Maria in Via; 1675–1680	Succeeded by Francesco Maidalchini
