= Paolo Odierna =

Most Reverend Paolo Odierna
- Bishop of Gaeta
- Church: Catholic Church
- Diocese: Diocese of Gaeta
- In office: 1494–1506
- Successor: Fernando Herrera (bishop)

Personal details
- Died: 13 August 1506 Gaeta, Italy

Paolo Odierna (died 1506) was a Roman Catholic prelate who served as Bishop of Gaeta (1494–1506).

== Biography ==
On 22 October 1494, Paolo Odierna was appointed during the papacy of Pope Alexander VI as Bishop of Gaeta. He served as Bishop of Gaeta until his death on 13 August 1506.

== External links and additional sources ==
- Cheney, David M. "Archdiocese of Gaeta". Catholic-Hierarchy.org. (for Chronology of Bishops) ^{[self-published]}
- Chow, Gabriel. "Archdiocese of Gaeta (Italy)". GCatholic.org. (for Chronology of Bishops) ^{[self-published]}

Catholic Church titles
Preceded by	Bishop of Gaeta; 1494–1506	Succeeded by Fernando Herrera (bishop)
