= Fernando Herrera (bishop) =

Most Reverend Fernando Herrera
- Bishop of Gaeta
- Church: Catholic Church
- Diocese: Diocese of Gaeta
- In office: 1506–1518
- Predecessor: Paolo Odierna
- Successor: Tommaso De Vio

Personal details
- Died: 1518 Gaeta, Italy

Fernando Herrera (died 1518) was a Roman Catholic prelate who served as Bishop of Gaeta (1506–1518) in southern Italy, in the city of Gaeta.

== Biography ==
On 4 November 1506, Fernando Herrera was appointed by Pope Julius II as Bishop of Gaeta. He served in that capacity until his death in 1518.

== External links and additional sources ==
- Cheney, David M. "Archdiocese of Gaeta". Catholic-Hierarchy.org. (for Chronology of Bishops) ^{[self-published]}
- Chow, Gabriel. "Archdiocese of Gaeta (Italy)". GCatholic.org. (for Chronology of Bishops) ^{[self-published]}

Catholic Church titles
Preceded by Paolo Odierna	Bishop of Gaeta; 1506–1518	Succeeded by Tommaso De Vio
