= Carlo Berlingeri =

Roman Catholic Archbishop of Santa Severina

Most Reverend Carlo Berlingeri
- Archbishop of Santa Severina
- Church: Catholic Church
- Diocese: Diocese of Santa Severina
- In office: 1679–1719
- Predecessor: Muzio Soriano
- Successor: Nicolas Pisanelli

Orders
- Ordination: 9 December 1668
- Consecration: 30 November 1679 by Alessandro Crescenzi

Personal details
- Born: 1643 Cotrone, Italy
- Died: 5 January 1719 (age 76) Santa Severina, Italy

Carlo Berlingeri (1643–1719) was a Roman Catholic prelate who served as Archbishop of Santa Severina (1679–1719).

== Biography ==
Carlo Berlingeri was born in Cotrone, Italy in 1643 and ordained a priest on 9 December 1668. On 27 November 1679, he was appointed during the papacy of Pope Innocent XI as Archbishop of Santa Severina. On 30 November 1679, he was consecrated bishop by Alessandro Crescenzi, Bishop of Recanati e Loreto, with Prospero Bottini, Titular Archbishop of Myra, and Pier Antonio Capobianco, Bishop Emeritus of Lacedonia, serving as co-consecrators. He served as Archbishop of Santa Severina until his death on 5 January 1719.

== External links and additional sources ==
- Cheney, David M. "Archbishop Muzio Soriano". Catholic-Hierarchy.org. (for Chronology of Bishops) ^{[self-published]}
- Chow, Gabriel. "Archdiocese of Santa Severina". GCatholic.org. (for Chronology of Bishops) ^{[self-published]}

Catholic Church titles
Preceded by Muzio Soriano	Archbishop of Santa Severina; 1679–1719	Succeeded by Nicolas Pisanelli
