= Francesco de Estrada =

Most Reverend Francesco de Estrada
- Archbishop of Brindisi
- Church: Catholic Church
- Archdiocese: Archdiocese of Brindisi
- In office: 1569–1671
- Predecessor: Lorenzo Reynoso
- Successor: Alfonso Álvarez Barba Ossorio

Orders
- Consecration: 17 August 1659 by Marcantonio Franciotti

Personal details
- Born: 1599 Montilla, Spain
- Died: 23 November 1671 (age 72) Brindisi, Italy

Francesco de Estrada (1599–1671) was a Roman Catholic prelate who served as Archbishop of Brindisi (1569–1671).

== Biography ==
Francesco de Estrada was born in Montilla, Spain in 1599. On 28 July 1659, he was appointed during the papacy of Pope Alexander VII as Archbishop of Brindisi. On 17 August 1659, he was consecrated bishop by Marcantonio Franciotti, Cardinal-Priest of Santa Maria della Pace, with Stefano Quaranta, Archbishop of Amalfi, and Francisco Suárez de Villegas, Titular Bishop of Memphis, serving as co-consecrators. He served as Archbishop of Brindisi until his death on 23 November 1671.

Catholic Church titles
Preceded by Lorenzo Reynoso	Archbishop of Brindisi; 1569–1671	Succeeded by Alfonso Álvarez Barba Ossorio
