= Alessandro Argoli (bishop of Veroli) =

Roman Catholic bishop

Most Reverend Alessandro Argoli
- Bishop of Veroli
- Church: Catholic Church
- Diocese: Diocese of Veroli
- In office: 1651–1654
- Predecessor: Vincenzo Lanteri
- Successor: Francesco Lambardi (bishop)

Orders
- Ordination: May 1650
- Consecration: 5 November 1651 by Marcantonio Franciotti

Personal details
- Born: 4 September 1594 Avezzano, Italy
- Died: 26 April 1654 (age 59)

Alessandro Argoli (1594–1654) was a Roman Catholic prelate who served as Bishop of Veroli (1651–1654).

== Biography ==
Alessandro Argoli was born in Avezzano, Italy on 4 September 1594 and was ordained a priest in May 1650. On 28 October 1651, he was appointed during the papacy of Pope Innocent X as Bishop of Veroli. On 5 November 1651, he was consecrated bishop by Marcantonio Franciotti, Cardinal-Priest of Santa Maria della Pace, with Giambattista Spada, Titular Patriarch of Constantinople, and Girolamo Buonvisi, Titular Archbishop of Laodicea in Phrygia, serving as co-consecrators. He served as Bishop of Veroli until his death on 26 April 1654.

== External links and additional sources ==
- Cheney, David M. "Diocese of Frosinone-Veroli-Ferentino". Catholic-Hierarchy.org. (for Chronology of Bishops) ^{[self-published]}
- Chow, Gabriel. "Diocese of Frosinone-Veroli-Ferentino (Italy)". GCatholic.org. (for Chronology of Bishops) ^{[self-published]}

Catholic Church titles
Preceded by Vincenzo Lanteri	Bishop of Veroli; 1651–1654	Succeeded by Francesco Lambardi (bishop)
