= Jerónimo Domín Funes =

Spanish Roman Catholic bishop

Most Reverend Jerónimo Domín Funes
- Bishop of Gaeta
- Church: Catholic Church
- Diocese: Diocese of Gaeta
- In office: 1636–1650
- Predecessor: Jacinto del Cerro
- Successor: Gabriel Ortiz de Orbé

Orders
- Consecration: 21 December 1637 by Gil Álvarez Carrillo de Albornoz

Personal details
- Born: 9 January 1576 Calatayud, Spain
- Died: 23 April 1650 (age 74) Gaeta, Italy

Jerónimo Domín Funes (9 January 1576 – 23 April 1650) was a Roman Catholic prelate who served as Bishop of Gaeta (1636–1650).

== Biography ==
Jerónimo Domín Funes was born in Calatayud, Spain and ordained a priest in the Order of Our Lady of Mount Carmel. On 30 December 1636, he was selected as Bishop of Gaeta and confirmed by Pope Urban VIII on 14 December 1637. On 21 December 1637, he was consecrated bishop by Gil Carrillo de Albornoz, Cardinal-Priest of Santa Maria in Via, with Diego Requeséns, Titular Archbishop of Cartagine, and Biago Proto de Rubeis, Archbishop of Messina, serving as co-consecrators. He served as Bishop of Gaeta until his death on 23 April 1650.

While bishop, he was the principal consecrator of Jacobus Wemmers, Titular Bishop of Memphis (1645).

== External links and additional sources ==
- Cheney, David M. "Archdiocese of Gaeta". Catholic-Hierarchy.org. (for Chronology of Bishops) ^{[self-published]}
- Chow, Gabriel. "Archdiocese of Gaeta (Italy)". GCatholic.org. (for Chronology of Bishops) ^{[self-published]}

Catholic Church titles
| Preceded by Jacinto del Cerro | Bishop of Gaeta; 1636–1650 | Succeeded by Gabriel Ortiz de Orbé |
