= Gabriel Ortiz de Orbé =

17th-century Roman Catholic bishop

Most Reverend Gabriel Ortiz de Orbé
- Bishop of Gaeta
- Church: Catholic Church
- Diocese: Diocese of Gaeta
- In office: 1651–1661
- Predecessor: Jerónimo Domín Funes
- Successor: Juan de Paredes

Orders
- Consecration: 5 Nov 1651 by Marcantonio Franciotti

Personal details
- Born: 1600 Castello Mendieta, Spain
- Died: 1661 (aged 60–61)

Gabriel Ortiz de Orbé (1600–1661) was a Roman Catholic prelate who served as Bishop of Gaeta (1651–1661).

== Biography ==
Gabriel Ortiz de Orbé was born in 1600 in Castello Mendieta, Spain. On 28 Oct 1651, he was appointed during the papacy of Pope Innocent X as Bishop of Gaeta. On 5 Nov 1651, he was consecrated bishop by Marcantonio Franciotti, Cardinal-Priest of Santa Maria della Pace, with Giambattista Spada, Titular Patriarch of Constantinople, and Girolamo Buonvisi, Titular Archbishop of Laodicea in Phrygia, serving as co-consecrators. He served as Bishop of Gaeta until his death in 1661.

== External links and additional sources ==
- Cheney, David M. "Archdiocese of Gaeta". Catholic-Hierarchy.org. (for Chronology of Bishops) ^{[self-published]}
- Chow, Gabriel. "Archdiocese of Gaeta (Italy)". GCatholic.org. (for Chronology of Bishops) ^{[self-published]}

Catholic Church titles
Preceded by Jerónimo Domín Funes	Bishop of Gaeta; 1651–1661	Succeeded by Juan de Paredes
