= Muzio Soriano =

17th-century Roman Catholic bishop

Most Reverend Muzio Soriano
- Archbishop of Santa Severina
- Church: Catholic Church
- Archdiocese: Archdiocese of Santa Severina
- In office: 1674–1679
- Predecessor: Giuseppe Palermo
- Successor: Carlo Berlingeri

Orders
- Ordination: 22 May 1655
- Consecration: 4 Mar 1674 by Francesco Nerli (iuniore)

Personal details
- Born: 11 Oct 1629 Cotrone, Italy
- Died: 26 Aug 1679 (age 49)

Muzio Soriano (1629–1679) was a Roman Catholic prelate who served as Archbishop of Santa Severina (1674–1679).

== Biography ==
Muzio Soriano was born on 11 Oct 1629 in Cotrone, Italy and ordained a priest on 22 May 1655. On 19 Feb 1674, he was appointed during the papacy of Pope Clement X as Archbishop of Santa Severina. On 4 Mar 1674, he was consecrated bishop by Francesco Nerli (iuniore), Archbishop of Florence, with Francesco Boccapaduli, Bishop Emeritus of Città di Castello, and Giuseppe Eusanio, Titular Bishop of Porphyreon, serving as co-consecrators. He served as Archbishop of Santa Severina until his death on 26 Aug 1679.

== External links and additional sources ==
- Cheney, David M. "Archbishop Muzio Soriano". Catholic-Hierarchy.org. (for Chronology of Bishops) ^{[self-published]}
- Chow, Gabriel. "Archdiocese of Santa Severina". GCatholic.org. (for Chronology of Bishops) ^{[self-published]}

Catholic Church titles
Preceded by Giuseppe Palermo	Archbishop of Santa Severina; 1674–1679	Succeeded by Carlo Berlingeri
