= Riccardo Annibaleschi della Molara =

Most Reverend Riccardo Annibaleschi della Molara
- Bishop of Veroli
- Church: Catholic Church
- Diocese: Diocese of Veroli
- In office: 1675–1689
- Predecessor: Francesco Angelucci
- Successor: Domenico de Zaoli

Orders
- Ordination: 31 Mar 1675
- Consecration: 3 Jun 1675 by Francesco Nerli (iuniore)

Personal details
- Born: 1634 Rome, Italy
- Died: Mar 1689 (age 55)

Riccardo Annibaleschi della Molara (1634–1689) was a Roman Catholic prelate who served as Bishop of Veroli (1675–1689).

== Biography ==
Riccardo Annibaleschi della Molara was born in Rome, Italy in 1634. On 19 Mar 1675, he was ordained a deacon and on 31 Mar 1675 he was ordained a priest. On 27 May 1675, he was appointed during the papacy of Pope Clement X as Bishop of Veroli. On 3 Jun 1675, he was consecrated bishop by Francesco Nerli (iuniore), Archbishop of Florence. He served as Bishop of Veroli until his death in Mar 1689.

== External links and additional sources ==
- Cheney, David M. "Diocese of Frosinone-Veroli-Ferentino". Catholic-Hierarchy.org. (for Chronology of Bishops) ^{[self-published]}
- Chow, Gabriel. "Diocese of Frosinone-Veroli-Ferentino (Italy)". GCatholic.org. (for Chronology of Bishops) ^{[self-published]}

Catholic Church titles
Preceded by Francesco Angelucci	Bishop of Veroli; 1675–1689	Succeeded by Domenico de Zaoli
