= Francesco Patrizi (bishop) =

Francesco Patrizi of Siena (Franciscus Patricius Senensis) (1413–1494) was an important political philosopher of the Italian Renaissance before the generation of Niccolò Machiavelli (1469-1527) and Francesco Guicciardini (1483-1540). He was the principal exponent of the humanist tradition of ‘virtue politics.’ He was the first Western political philosopher since antiquity to devote sustained attention to the question of how a republic devoted to liberty and equality could uphold meritocratic principles in government—how it could ensure that its rulers and political class generally were public-spirited, well-educated men of virtue and wisdom. He was the first political philosopher since Aristotle to devote sustained attention to citizenship (in both its republican and royal varieties), and the first to explore the potential of a planned urban environment to shape civic values and facilitate a free way of life. He was also the pioneer of a new ‘historico-prudential’ approach to political thought that applied the study of the humanities, above all history, to the reform of republican and royal institutions.

He acted as governor of Foligno, then in the Papal States, for several years from 1461. Pius II, who was a personal friend, appointed him bishop of Gaeta in the same year.

== Significance ==
Though almost unknown today, Patrizi’s influence in the later Renaissance, as shown by the printing history of his works, was enormous. In the sixteenth century his political writings were published more often than either More’s Utopia or Erasmus’ Education of a Christian Prince. Printings of Machiavelli’s three great political treatises—The Prince, the Discourses, and The Art of War—slightly outnumbered the printings of Patrizi’s two major works, How to Found a Republic and On Kingship. But on the evidence of their printing history, Patrizi was arguably more influential among the more highly educated. Editions of Machiavelli were mostly in Italian, a European language of culture by the later sixteenth century, but Patrizi’s works were far better known in Latin, the international language of scholarship. They were also translated into Italian, French, Spanish and German, and epitomes of his works circulated in Latin, French, and English.

One reason for Patrizi’s popularity was his extraordinary learning. Patrizi was the first political theorist in European history to have access to almost the entire corpus of ancient Greek political thought and history we possess today. A highly accomplished Hellenist himself, he was able to study and synthesize the newly available Greek literature that was rapidly filling the shelves of Italian libraries during the quattrocento, both in the original and in new Latin translations made by his fellow humanists. Medieval scholastics had been able to study Aristotle’s Politics after the Dominican friar William of Moerbeke translated it into Latin around 1260, and the encounter with Aristotle made a deep impression on theorists from Thomas Aquinas to Marsilius of Padua. But the translation movement of the Renaissance vastly extended the Latin West’s access to the heritage of ancient Greece. The medievals had not possessed any of the political works of Plato, Xenophon, Isocrates, Polybius, Dio Chrysostom, or Plutarch. They had no access to the political history of the Greeks written by Herodotus, Thucydides, or Xenophon, or to the Greek historians of the Roman Empire such as Polybius, Appian, Dionysius of Halicarnassus, Diodorus Siculus, and Arrian. Patrizi read and excerpted all these authors, and many other Greek and Latin writers as well.

== Ideas ==
One conviction Patrizi took from his Greek authorities, fundamental to virtue politics, was that political institutions could not function well unless the princes and magistrates who inhabited them were well educated men of good character and practical wisdom. ‘The man who cannot govern himself cannot govern others’ was a favorite classical adage with him as with other humanists. Unlike some other humanists, however, Patrizi did not adopt the view, common in his day, that institutions were irrelevant so long as rulers were virtuous. Patrizi recognized the superficiality of this view. He posed the question how institutions could be designed to promote virtue among rulers and to protect the organs of the republic from wounds inflicted by ignorant, greedy and power-hungry persons. He devised a mode of public deliberation that privileged the voices of the best citizens. He proposed as his optimus status reipublicae, or best possible republic, a mixed constitution led by aristocrats, though his necessary condition for membership in the aristocracy was not high birth but good character and humane learning. He was nevertheless aware of the claims all good citizens have to participate in their own government and understood, like Aristotle, that broader participation by citizens in their government reinforces political stability.

Citizens could not participate in government without some education. By a natural process of thought Patrizi became the first author in European history to advocate universal literacy among the citizen class as well as public funding for teachers of the liberal arts. In the De republica he outlines a detailed curriculum designed to foster virtue in citizen-rulers. Patrizi went so far as to say that no one should be considered a citizen who did not possess basic literacy. He was in fact the first political thinker since Aristotle to devote sustained attention to the concept of citizenship in both its republican and royal varieties. To provide equal justice for all citizens, the best republic had to be built on the rule of law: the law must always stand above and limit the will of magistrates. The principles of law, however, were to be drawn from nature and tradition—above all, the tradition of Roman law—and not from revelation. Religious law was its own distinct system and should be administered by priests, not enforced by the state. Patrizi calls for reformation of the legal system to protect it from the influence of wealth; hence both prosecutors and defense attorneys should work for honor alone or be paid by the state. He did not propose an independent judiciary but relied on an elaborate system of appeal to prevent corruption.

Like other humanists, Patrizi advocated a moral economy, one in which the pursuit of mercantile profit was to be subordinated to the needs of family and community. The moral economy, Patrizi thought, could be achieved by educating merchants and bankers in the virtues of frugality and generosity and teaching them to avoid greed and luxury. The republic could help by building strong civic norms of acceptable behavior. Among these norms Patrizi emphasizes the importance of work for all citizens and the avoidance of idleness. No one should live entirely on rents or devote himself wholly to pleasure. Patrizi defends private property but says it must be limited; and the rich should be prevented from taking advantage of the poor. Patrizi proposed a scheme of agrarian reform whereby state lands would be leased on a long-term basis to the rural poor in order to prevent them from falling under the power of wealthy landowners. According to the Sienese philosopher, the income from its land leases would give the state financial independence and allow it to keep taxes low and avoid reliance on forced loans from the rich, a method of finance that always undermined the independence of magistrates.

Patrizi was also an advocate of the ‘virtuous environment.’ Following the lead of Leon Batttista Alberti and of his patron, Pope Pius II, Patrizi was the first political theorist to explore the potential of urban planning to shape civic values and to facilitate a free way of life. Drawing on the expertise of architects and on classical antiquity for inspiration, Patrizi believed that magistrates and founders of new cities should make their cities strong and beautiful. The public and private spaces were to remind citizens of their Roman ancestors. The fine arts were to be cultivated with a view to encouraging virtue, piety, and love of country. The city should also encourage the study of poetry, oratory, history, and philosophy to ennoble the minds of its citizens.

== Biography ==
Francesco Patrizi’s political experience was extensive and varied. He was born into the most important hereditary bloc of political families in his native city of Siena, the Nove, which remained the dominant force in Sienese politics for most of his lifetime. He held numerous offices in the Sienese republic, including the priorate – the republic’s governing body – and other executive posts in the city’s territories. He headed at least six major ambassadorial missions in the decade before the coup (1457) that led to his exile. He also enjoyed a prominent social position in the city. He married, had four children, and maintained a large household with an urban palazzo and rural properties. He was a professor of literature in Siena’s public Studio (or university) and private tutor to Achille Petrucci, offspring of the city’s most important political family of the quattrocento and a future civic leader. After his exile from Siena in 1457, Patrizi supported himself briefly as private tutor to the son of the Milanese ambassador, and in that capacity met leading statesmen and princes from Tuscany and northern Italy. When his friend Enea Silvio Piccolomini became Pope Pius II in September 1458, Patrizi took holy orders and was made the Bishop of Gaeta (1461). Soon thereafter, Pius appointed him governor of Foligno and its territories, a key post in the Papal State. After Pius’ death in 1464, his position in Foligno became untenable owing to a popular uprising, and he retired to administer his diocese in Gaeta, a port city in the Kingdom of Naples. The Kingdom was ruled by Ferdinand I of Naples (known as Ferrante), the most powerful monarch of the peninsula. In Gaeta Patrizi finished his two major political treatises, De institutione reipublicae (finished 1471/72) and De regno et regis institutione (1483/84). His life in that small city was mostly a retired one, but even so he was called upon to advise the heir to the throne, Alfonso of Calabria, and to represent the Kingdom as the Aragonese orator (or ambassador) on two major public occasions, the marriage of Alfonso with Ippolita Maria Sforza in Milan (1465), and the ceremonies for the coronation of Pope Innocent VIII (1484).

== Works ==
=== Political Treatises ===
- De institutione reipublicae, datable to 1461/71, although the presumed dedication copy is dated 1479. 9 books on the ideal structure and institutions of a republic, including considerations of the ideas of other thinkers, history, and common wisdom.
- De regno et regis institutione, datable to 1481/84. 9 books of his ideas on kingship and monarchy, which also discuss previous scholars’ work as well as history and general knowledge.

=== Latin Poetry ===
- Poematum libri IV. A collection of 41 poems in various meters, composed in Patrizi’s early career and scribally published in 1461 with a dedication to Pope Pius II. The only one to become well known was 2.2, “De Christi Natali,” which survives in at least eighteen copies and was printed in Padua in 1482. In some manuscripts it was attributed falsely to Francesco Filelfo or Tommaso Schifaldo, a student of Patrizi.
- Epigrammaton liber. A collection of 345 epigrams of varying lengths, composed by Patrizi in the latter part of his career and apparently left unpublished at his death.

=== Grammatical works ===
- De metris Horatii (1441-1444?). A treatise on Horatian meters, surviving in two manuscripts.
- Epitome of Quintilian’s Institutes. Written probably between 1457 and 1460, and dedicated to Patrizi’s pupil, Francesco Tranchedini.
- Epitome of Priscian’s Institutes of Grammar. Probably written between 1457 and 1460. Commentary on Petrarch’s Canzoniere. The work was commissioned by Patrizi’s patron, Alfonso, duke of Calabria in 1476 or 1477. It is the only surviving work of Patrizi written in the vernacular, apart from a small number of letters.

=== Speeches ===
- Oratio de laudibus philosophiae, composed for the inauguration of the school year in Siena, 1426.
- Oratio ad Hippolytam Mariam Sfortiam. Also called De maritalis coniugii dignitate oratio or De matrimonio. Delivered in Milan before Duke Francesco Sforza for the wedding of his daught Ippolita Maria to Alfonso, duke of Calabria in May, 1465. Oratio ad Innocentium VIII. Oration on behalf of King Ferrante of Naples to celebrate the crowning of Innocent VII as pope, 29 December 1484.

=== Historical works ===
De origine et antiquitate urbis Senae. The date of composition is uncertain, but it probably falls after 1460.

=== Letters ===
Letters. De Capua divides the surviving letters into two groups: (a) the Foligno Corpus (173 letters), written while Patrizi was the governor of Foligno; and (b) the Lettere sparse or scattered letters (63 letters, to and from Patrizi), collected from various manuscript sources by De Capua. De magistratu gerendo. A letter-treatise directed to Achille Petrucci, written about 1445.

== Bibliography ==
- F. Battaglia, Enea Silvio Piccolomini e Francesco Patrizi, Siena, 1936;
- G. M. Cappelli, Ad actionem secundum virtutem tendit. Vita activa e vita contemplativa nel pensiero umanistico, in F. Lisi (ed.), The Ways of Life in Classical political Philosophy, Sankt Augustin, Academia Verlag, 2004, pp. 203–30
- G. Chiarelli, Il “De Regno” di Francesco Patrizi, Rivista Internazionale di Filosofia del Diritto, XII (1932), pp. 716–38;
- Paola de Capua. 1991. “Francesco Patrizi, Epistolario.” Ph.D. dissertation, Università degli Studi di Messina.
- Paola de Capua. 2014. Le lettere di Francesco Patrizi. Messina: Centro internazionale di studi umanistici
- James Hankins. 2023. Political Meritocracy in Renaissance Italy: The Virtuous Republic of Francesco Patrizi of Siena. Cambridge, MA: Harvard University Press.
- Gabriele Pedullà. 2010. “Francesco Patrizi e le molte vite dell’umanista.” In Sergio Luzzato andGabriele Pedulla, eds. Atlante della letteratura italiana. Vol. 1: Dalle origini al Rinascimento, ed. Amedeo De Vincentiis, 1: 457-464. Turin: Einaudi.
- M. S. Sapegno, Il trattato politico e utopico, in Letteratura italiana, dir. A. Asor Rosa, III/2. Le forme del testo: La prosa, Torino, Einaudi, 1984, p. 969-70.
