= Francisco Suárez de Villegas =

Most Reverend Francisco Suárez de Villegas
- Titular Bishop of Memphis
- Church: Catholic Church
- In office: 1649–1664
- Predecessor: Jacobus Wemmers

Orders
- Ordination: 24 November 1611
- Consecration: 21 December 1649 by Giulio Roma

Personal details
- Died: 17 April 1664

Francisco Suárez de Villegas, O. Carm. (died 1664) was a Roman Catholic prelate who served as Titular Bishop of Memphis (1649–1664).

== Biography ==
Francisco Suárez de Villegas was born in Lisbon, Portugal and ordained a priest in the Order of the Brothers of the Blessed Virgin Mary of Mount Carmel on 24 November 1611. On 9 December 1649, he was appointed during the papacy of Pope Innocent X as Vicar Apostolic and Titular Bishop of Memphis. On 21 December 1649, he was consecrated bishop by Giulio Roma, Bishop of Tivoli, with Onorato Onorati, Bishop of Urbania e Sant'Angelo in Vado, and Francesco Visconti, Bishop of Cremona, serving as co-consecrators. He served as Vicar Apostolic and Titular Bishop of Memphis until his death on 17 April 1664.

== Episcopal succession ==
While bishop, he was the principal co-consecrator of:

- Flaminio Marcellino, Bishop of Cesena (1655);
- Francesco de Estrada, Archbishop of Brindisi (1659);
- Attilio Pietrasanta, Bishop of Vigevano (1659); and
- Lorenzo Díaz de Encinas, Bishop of Ugento (1659).

== External links and additional sources ==
- Cheney, David M. "Memphis (Titular See)". Catholic-Hierarchy.org. (for Chronology of Bishops) ^{[self-published]}
- Chow, Gabriel. "Titular Episcopal See of Memphis (Egypt)". GCatholic.org. (for Chronology of Bishops) ^{[self-published]}

Catholic Church titles
Preceded by Jacobus Wemmers	Titular Bishop of Memphis; 1649–1664	Succeeded by
