= Pierre Parcevich =

Most Reverend Pierre Parcevich
- Church: Catholic Church
- In office: 1656–1674
- Predecessor: Marcus Bandulovi
- Successor: Vitus Piluzzi

Orders
- Consecration: 25 March 1656 by Marcantonio Franciotti

Personal details
- Born: 1608 Chiprovatz
- Died: 23 July 1674 (age 66)

Pierre Parcevich (1608–1674) was a Roman Catholic prelate who served as Titular Bishop of Marcianopolis (1656–1674).

== Biography ==
Pierre Parcevich was born in Chiprovatz in 1608. On 6 March 1656, he was appointed during the papacy of Pope Alexander VII as Titular Bishop of Marcianopolis and Vicar Apostolic. On 25 March 1656, he was consecrated bishop by Marcantonio Franciotti, Cardinal-Priest of Santa Maria della Pace. He served as Titular Bishop of Marcianopolis until his death on 23 July 1674.

== External links and additional sources ==
- Cheney, David M. "Marcianopolis (Titular See)". Catholic-Hierarchy.org. (for Chronology of Bishops) ^{[self-published]}
- Chow, Gabriel. "Titular Metropolitan See of Marcianopolis (Bulgaria)". GCatholic.org. (for Chronology of Bishops) ^{[self-published]}

Catholic Church titles
Preceded by Marcus Bandulovi	Titular Bishop of Marcianopolis; 1656–1674	Succeeded by Vitus Piluzzi
