= Luigi Vari =

Italian Catholic prelate

- Archbishop of Gaeta
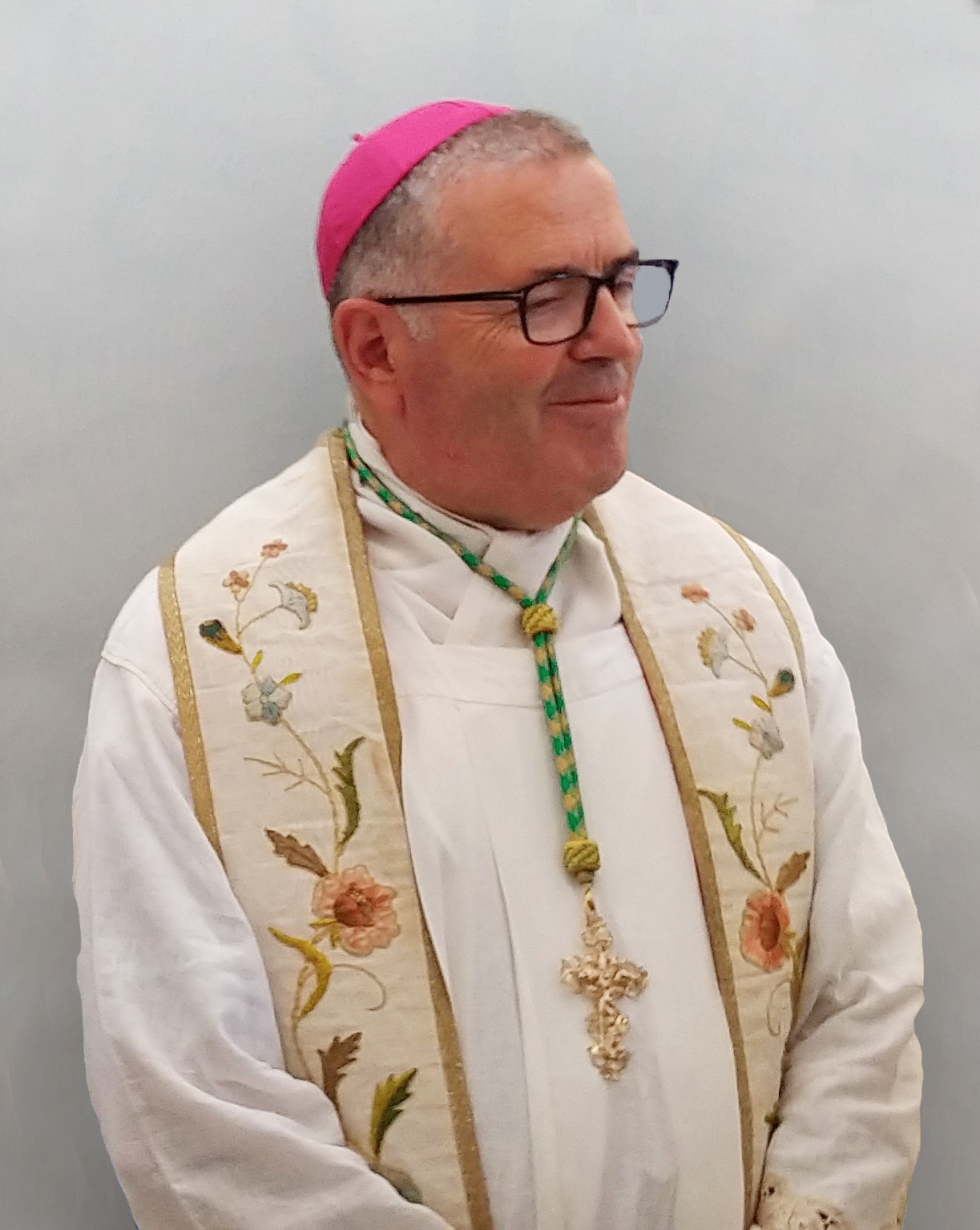
- Vari in 2019
- Church: Catholic Church
- Archdiocese: Archdiocese of Gaeta
- Appointed: 21 April 2016
- Predecessor: Fabio Bernardo D'Onorio

Orders
- Ordination: 13 September 1980 by Dante Bernini
- Consecration: 21 June 2016 by Vincenzo Apicella

Personal details
- Born: 2 March 1957 (age 69) Segni, Lazio, Italy
- Coat of arms

Luigi Vari (born 2 March 1957) is an Italian prelate of the Catholic Church who has been Archbishop of Gaeta since 2016.

== Biography ==
Luigi Vari was born in Segni on 2 March 1957, the second of three sons born to Felicetta and Bruno Vari. He obtained his classical high school diploma in 1975 and earned a baccalaureate in theology at the regional seminary, the Pontifical Leonian College in Anagni. He was ordained a priest of the Diocese of Velletri (Note: It became part of the Diocese of Velletri-Segni on 20 October 1981.) on 13 September 1980. He continued his theological studies in Rome, living at the Pontifical French Seminary and obtaining a licentiate in Biblical science at the Pontifical Biblical Institute.

Returning to the diocese of Velletri-Segni, he was assistant pastor of the parish of Santa Maria in Trivio from 1983 to 1991 and parish priest of the parish of Santa Maria Maggiore in Valmontone from 1991 to 2016. On the diocesan level, he was appointed assistant of Catholic Action and then regional assistant for Lazio of the Catholic Action youth sector in 1987. After teaching religion from 1983 to 1991, he was director of the School Office and Head of Catholic Religion Teachers from 2006 to 2008. He was a member of the Presbyteral Council from 1983 to 2016, a member of the College of Consultors from 1991 to 2016 and Episcopal Vicar for Pastoral Care from 1995 to 2016.

He continued to pursue his academic career as well. In the years 1998-1999 he attended doctoral courses in theology at the Pontifical University of St. Thomas Aquinas in Rome, earning his doctorate in theology in 2010 with the thesis: "Like the eyes of the servant in the hand of the mistress. Perspectives for a narrative reading of the Bible: Lk 6, 36-50". He was a lecturer at the Pontifical Leonian College from 1985 to 2016 and taught the New Testament at the Apollinare Institute of the Pontifical University of the Holy Cross from 1999 to 2002. He was Extraordinary Professor of the Leonian Theological Institute, attached to the Pontifical Theological Faculty "Teresianum" from 2002 to 2016 and director of that institute from 2010 to 2016.

On 21 April 2016, Pope Francis appointed him Archbishop of Gaeta. He received his episcopal consecration in his parish church in Valmonte on 21 June by Dante Bernini, a former bishop of Velletri-Segni, and he was installed in Gaeta on 9 July.

He was made a member of the Congregation for the Causes of Saints on 5 December 2020.
