= Lorenzo Casoni =

Italian Roman Catholic cardinal

His Eminence Lorenzo Casoni
- Cardinal-Priest of San Pietro in Vincoli
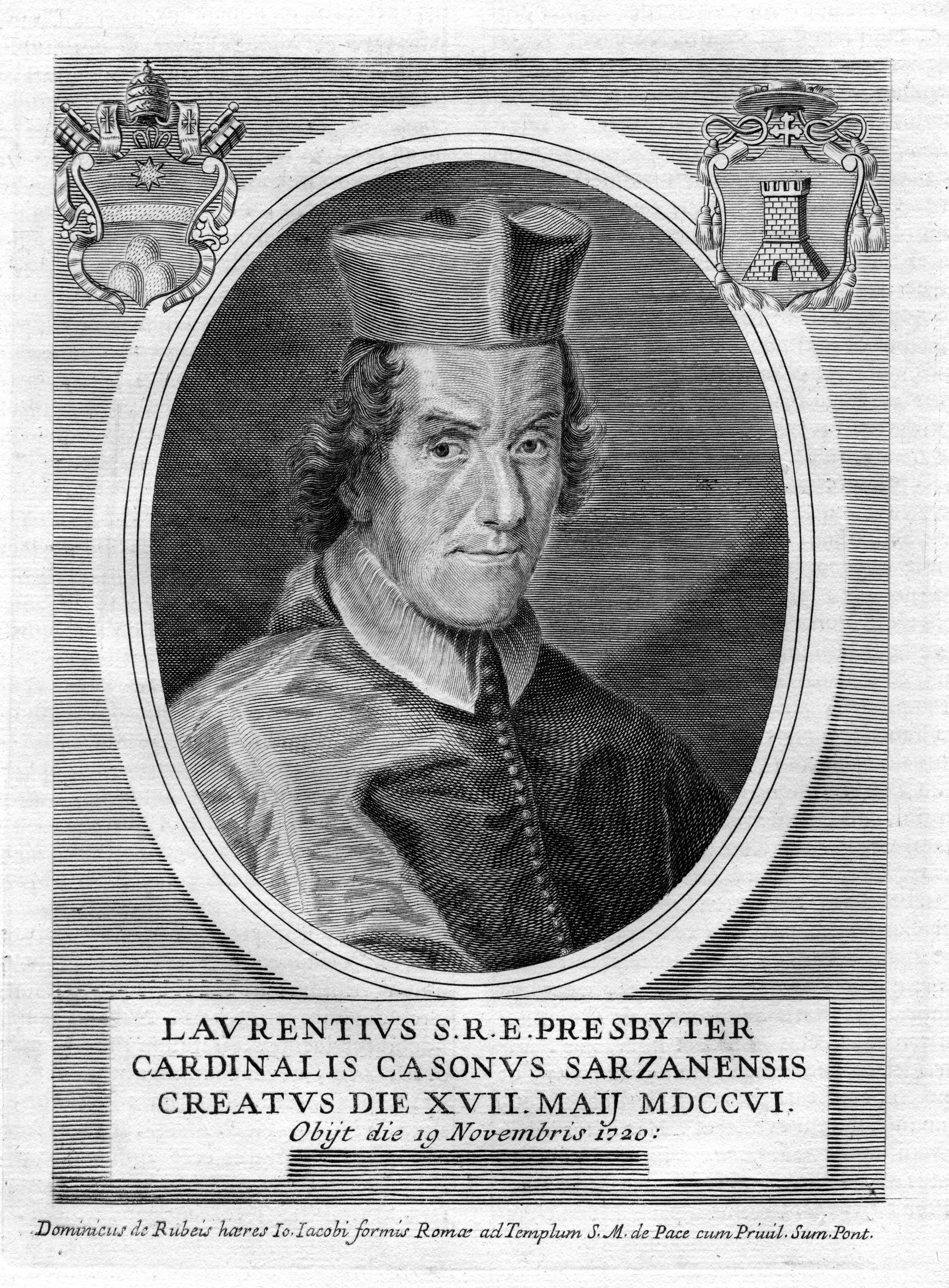
- Church: Catholic Church

Orders
- Consecration: 12 Mar 1690 by Francesco Nerli (iuniore)

Personal details
- Born: September 10, 1645 Sarzana, Italy
- Died: 19 Nov 1720 (age 75) Rome, Italy

Lorenzo Casoni (September 10, 1645-November 19, 1720) was a Roman Catholic cardinal.

== Biography ==
Lorenzo Casoni was born in Sarzana on September 10, 1645, the son of Niccolò, count of Villanova, and Giulia Petriccioli. The family was of noble and religious origins: his cousin was Monsignor Agostino Favoriti, secretary of Pope Innocent XI, to which post he later succeeded. His great-grandnephews were later Cardinal Filippo Casoni, in 1801, and Cardinal Luigi Vannicelli Casoni, in 1839.

Pope Innocent XI made him "secret chamberlain of honor" and canon of Santa Maria Maggiore. On March 3, 1690, he was elected titular archbishop of Caesarea, with dispensation for not receiving the diaconate and presbyterate.

On 12 Mar 1690, he was consecrated bishop by Francesco Nerli (iuniore), Cardinal-Priest of San Matteo in Merulana.

Pope Clement XI elevated him to the rank of cardinal in the consistory of May 17, 1706. In honor of the two popes who had helped him, he had two monuments erected in the Chapel of the Crucifix in Sarzana, his hometown.

He died on November 19, 1720, at the age of 75.

Catholic Church titles
Preceded by Giacomo Cantelmo	Titular Archbishop of Caesarea in Cappadocia; 1690–1706	Succeeded by Giorgio Spinola
Preceded by Marcantonio Vincentini	Apostolic Nuncio to Naples; 1690–1702	Succeeded by Giambattista Patrizi
Preceded by Urbano Sacchetti	Cardinal-Priest of San Bernardo alle Terme; 1706–1715	Succeeded by Francesco Barberini (iuniore)
Preceded by Ferdinando d'Adda	Cardinal-Priest of San Pietro in Vincoli; 1715–1720	Succeeded by Lorenzo Corsini
