= Girolamo Asteo =

Roman Catholic prelate

Most Reverend Girolamo Asteo
- Bishop of Veroli
- Church: Catholic Church
- Diocese: Diocese of Veroli
- In office: 1608–1626
- Predecessor: Eugenio Fucci
- Successor: Baglione Carradoli

Orders
- Consecration: 23 November 1608 by Marcello Lante della Rovere

Personal details
- Born: 1562
- Died: 15 August 1626 (aged 63–64) Veroli, Italy

Girolamo Asteo, O.F.M. Conv. (1562 – 1626) was a Roman Catholic prelate who served as Bishop of Veroli (1608–1626).

== Biography ==
Girolamo Asteo was born in 1562 and ordained a priest in the Order of Friars Minor Conventual. On 17 November 1608, he was appointed during the papacy of Pope Paul V as Bishop of Veroli. On 23 November 1608, he was consecrated bishop by Marcello Lante della Rovere, Bishop of Todi, with Giovanni Battista del Tufo, Bishop Emeritus of Acerra, and Paolo de Curtis, Bishop Emeritus of Isernia, serving as co-consecrators. He served as Bishop of Veroli until his death on 15 August 1626.

== External links and additional sources ==
- Cheney, David M. "Diocese of Frosinone-Veroli-Ferentino". Catholic-Hierarchy.org. (for Chronology of Bishops) ^{[self-published]}
- Chow, Gabriel. "Diocese of Frosinone-Veroli-Ferentino (Italy)". GCatholic.org. (for Chronology of Bishops) ^{[self-published]}

Catholic Church titles
Preceded by Eugenio Fucci	Bishop of Veroli; 1608–1626	Succeeded by Baglione Carradoli
