= Vitus Piluzzi =

Roman Catholic prelate

Most Reverend Vitus Piluzzi
- Titular Archbishop of Marcianopolis
- Church: Catholic Church
- In office: 1678–1704
- Predecessor: Pierre Parcevich
- Successor: Giovanni Vincenzo Castelli

Orders
- Consecration: 18 September 1678 by Alessandro Crescenzi (cardinal)

Personal details
- Died: 6 January 1704

Vitus Piluzzi, O.F.M. Conv. (died 6 January 1704) was a Roman Catholic prelate who served as Titular Archbishop of Marcianopolis (1678–1704).

== Biography ==
Vitus Piluzzi was ordained a priest in the Order of Friars Minor Conventual. On 5 September 1678, he was appointed during the papacy of Pope Innocent XI as Titular Archbishop of Marcianopolis. On 18 September 1678, he was consecrated bishop by Alessandro Crescenzi (cardinal), Bishop of Recanati e Loreto, with Domenico Gianuzzi, Titular Bishop of Dioclea in Phrygia, and Bartolomeo Menatti, Bishop of Lodi, serving as co-consecrators. He served as Titular Archbishop of Marcianopolis until his death on 6 January 1704.

While bishop, he was the principal co-consecrator of Giaconto Tuartkovich, Bishop of Ston.

== External links and additional sources ==
- Cheney, David M. "Marcianopolis (Titular See)". Catholic-Hierarchy.org. (for Chronology of Bishops) ^{[self-published]}
- Chow, Gabriel. "Titular Metropolitan See of Marcianopolis". GCatholic.org. (for Chronology of Bishops) ^{[self-published]}

Catholic Church titles
Preceded by Pierre Parcevich	Titular Archbishop of Marcianopolis; 1678–1704	Succeeded by Giovanni Vincenzo Castelli
