= Carmelo Pujia (bishop) =

Italian bishop and archbishop

Carmelo Pujia (25 October 1852, Filadelfia – 20 August 1937) was an Italian bishop and archbishop.

== Offices ==
- Bishop of Anglona-Tursi - appointed 13 July 1897, ordained bishop 16 January 1898
- Archbishop of Santa Severina - appointed 30 October 1905
- Bishop of Crotone (suffragan of Reggio archdiocese) - appointed 13 February 1925
- Archbishop of Reggio Calabria - appointed 11 February 1927, installed 10 July 1927
