= Francesco Peretti di Montalto =

Italian Catholic Cardinal

Francesco Peretti di Montalto (1597 – 4 May 1655) was an Italian Catholic Cardinal.

Peretti was born to an Italian noble family. By birth, he was to be the successor of his father; Prince of Venafro, Venetian patrician, Marquis of San Martino, Count of Celano and Baron of Pescina. However, he was also a nephew of Cardinal Alessandro Peretti di Montalto and a great-grand-nephew of Pope Sixtus V. As his father's only son, he was urged to marry to continue the family line. He chose the Princess of Cesi but his father disapproved. Dismayed by his father's prohibition, he ran away from home and went to Rome to become a priest.

Little is known of his early ecclesiastic career, but having served faithfully, he was elevated to cardinal on 16 December 1641 by Pope Urban VIII and was made Cardinal-priest of San Girolamo degli Schiavoni on 10 February 1642. He participated in the Papal conclave of 1644 which elected Pope Innocent X.

He was elected Archbishop of Monreale in 1650. He was named Camerlengo of the Sacred College of Cardinals from 1653 to 1654 and participated in the Papal conclave of 1655 which elected Pope Alexander VII.

Peretti was responsible for commissioning the Baroque facade of the Basilica of Sant'Andrea della Valle by Carlo Rainaldi, which was started in 1655. He died on 3 May of that year at the age of 58 and was buried in the chapel of his family pope, Sixtus V.

Catholic Church titles
Preceded by Péter Pázmány	Cardinal-Priest of San Girolamo dei Croati; 1642–1655	Succeeded by Girolamo Buonvisi
Preceded by Giovanni Torresiglia	Archbishop of Monreale; 1650–1655	Succeeded by Luis Alfonso de Los Cameros
