= Porphyreon =

Roman-era towns in Phoenice Prima

Porphyreon is the name for two towns, north and south, in the late Roman province of Phoenice Prima. One of the towns was a bishopric that was a suffragan of the metropolitan see of Tyre.

== Porphyreon North ==
The northern Porphyreon was described by Scylax north of Sidon and also by Palerin of Bordeaux eight miles from Sidon. It corresponds to present-day Jieh, Lebanon.

== Porphyreon South (bishopric) ==
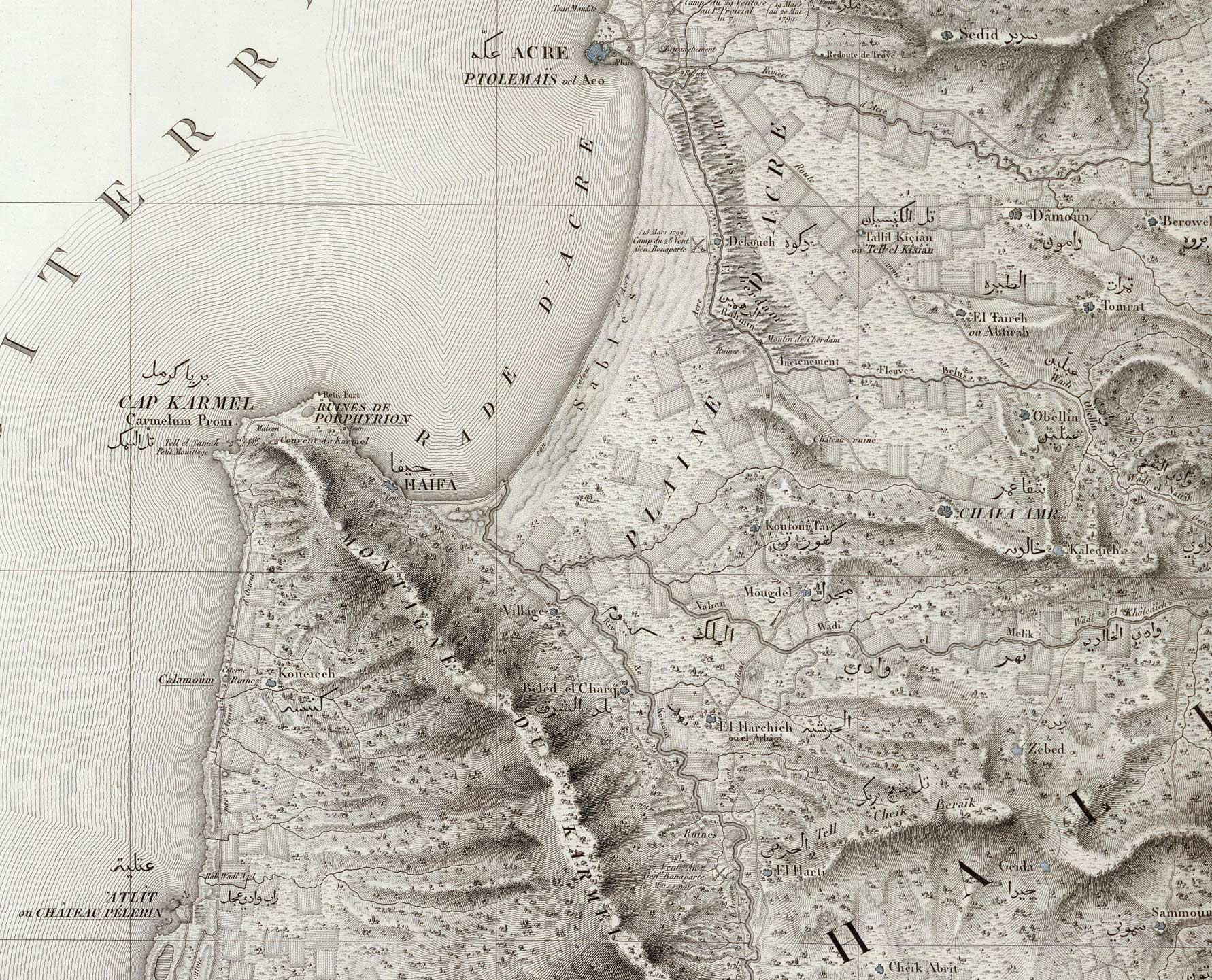
Porphyreon's location presumed in the 1799 Carte de l'Égypte (Description de l'Égypte), near Haifa el-Atika

Porphyreon south, according to the Pseudo-Antoninus, may be located six or seven miles north of Carmel. Historians of the Crusades (William of Tyre and James of Vitry) confound this town with Caipha.

In fact Simeon Stylite the Young, contemporary of Paul, Bishop of Porphyreon, affirms that the episcopal town may be found near Castra, a place inhabited by the Samaritans. Now, in the same epoch the Pseudo-Antoninus locates the Castra Samaritanorum a Sucamina (Caipha) milliario subtus monte Carmelo south of Porphyreon.

The church of Porphyreon, dedicated to the Blessed Virgin, was built by Justinian I. Procopius of Caesarea mentions Porphyreon in his book The Secret History of the Court of Justinian, mentioning that a lawyer from Caesarea named Evangelius, who had amassed great riches and landed estates, purchased Porphyrean, a village on the coast, for 3 centenars of gold, and when Justinian had heard of this, he immediately seized it from Evangelius, returning him only a small part of what he had paid, saying that it was unseemly that such a village should belong to Evangelius, the lawyer.

The ruins of Porphyreon should be found near Belus, the Nahr Namein, in the sands of which may still be seen the murex brandaris and the murex trunculus (thorny shell fish), from which is extracted the famous purple dye of Tyre, and which gave its name to Porphyreon. In modern days, the location of Porphyreon was identified with the later Arabic settlement of Tell es-Samak. The first excavations at the site were conducted by Joseph Elgavish and lasted 17 seasons, (1963–1979), exposing the strata from the Hellenistic, Roman and Byzantine periods. In 2010 a four-year Archaeological Project was launched, funded by the Hecht Foundation and carried out by Michael Eisenberg.

The Napoleonic era map survey of Pierre Jacotin marks the Ruines de Porphyrion as being located a kilometre north-east of the grotte d'Elie (now the site of the Stella Maris Monastery).

=== Bishopric ===
Porphyreon is described in the Notitia Episcopatuum of Antioch as belonging to the sixth century, but does not appear in that of the tenth century. Le Quien mentions five of its bishops:

- Thomas, 451;
- Alexander, at the end of the fifth century;
- Theodore, 518;
- Christophorus, 536;
- and Paul (contemporary of Justinian II), 565-78.
