= Roman Catholic Archdiocese of Santa Severina =

The archdiocese of Santa Severina was a Roman Catholic ecclesiastical territory in Calabria, southern Italy, that existed until 1986, when it was united with the diocese of Crotone to form the Archdiocese of Crotone-Santa Severina.

== History ==
Santa Severina (῾Αγία Σεβερίνη, Σεβεριάνη), built on a rocky precipice on the site of the ancient Siberena, became an important fortress of the Byzantines in their struggles with the Saracens. It is not known whether it was an episcopal see from the beginning of the Byzantine domination; When it became an archbishopric, probably in the tenth century, its suffragan sees were the Diocese of Orea, the Diocese of Acerenza, the Diocese of Gallipoli, the Diocese of Alessano and the Diocese of Castro.

The Greek Rite disappeared from the diocese under the Normans, but was retained in the San Severina cathedral during a great part of the thirteenth century. The earliest known bishop was one Giovanni, but his date is uncertain. From 1096, when the name of Bishop Stefano is recorded, the list of prelates is uninterrupted. Among them were:

- Ugo (1269), formerly prior of the Holy Sepulchre in Jerusalem;
- Jacopo (1400), who died in repute of sanctity;
- Alessandro della Marra (1488), who restored the episcopal palace and the cathedral;
- Giovanni Matteo Sertori, present at the Fifth Lateran Council;
- Giulio Sertori (1535), legate to Ferrara under Charles V of Spain and Philip II;
- Giulio Antonio Santorio (1566), later a cardinal;
- Fausto Caffarello (1624);
- Gian Antonio Parravicini (1654), as parish priest of Sondrio in Valtellina zealous against heretics;
- Francesco Falabello (1660), who suffered in defense of church rights;
- Carlo Berlingeri (1678);
- Nicolo Carmini Falco (1743), editor of the history of Dio Cassius.

In 1818, the territory of the suppressed diocese of Belcastro was united to Santa Severina. Belcastro, considered by some authorities to be the ancient Chonia, had bishops from 1122; noted was Jacopo di Giacomelli (1542), present at the Council of Trent. Bishops of San Leone are known from 1322 till 1571, when the diocese was united to that of Santa Severina. Other suppressions in that year, united to Santa Severina, were the Diocese of Cerenzia, Diocese of Strongoli, Diocese of Umbriatico. Another later holder was Carmelo Pujia from 1905 to 1925.

The archdiocese became reduced to one suffragan see, the diocese of Cariati.

== Bishops of Santa Severina ==
Erected: 7th Century
Latin Name: Dioecesis Sanctae Severinae

== Archbishops of Santa Severina ==
Elevated: 11th Century
Latin Name: Archidioecesis Sanctae Severinae

- Pietro Orseoli (1483–1483 Died)
- Alessandro della Marra (1488–1509 Died)
- Giovanni Matteo Sartori (1509–1531 Resigned)
- Giovanni Salviati (1531–1535 Resigned)
- Giulio Sartori (1535–1554 Resigned)
- Giovanni Battista Orsini (1554–1566 Died)
- Giulio Antonio Santorio (1566–1573 Resigned)

Territory Added: 1571 November 27 from the suppressed Diocese of San Leone

- Francesco Antonio Santorio (1573–1586 Appointed, Archbishop of Acerenza e Matera)
- Alfonso Pisani (1586–1623 Died)
- Fausto Caffarelli (1624–1654 Died)
- Giovanni Antonio Paravicini (1654–1659 Died)
- Francesco Falabella (1660–1670 Died)
- Giuseppe Palermo (1670–1673 Died)
- Muzio Soriano (1674–1679 Died)
- Carlo Berlingeri (1679–1719 Died)
- Nicolas Pisanelli (1719–1731 Died)
- Luigi d'Alessandro (1732–1743 Appointed, Archbishop (Personal Title) of Alessano)
- Nicolò Carmine Falcone (1743–1759 Died)
- Giovanni Battista Pignatelli (1759–1763 Appointed, Archbishop (Personal Title) of Anglona-Tursi)
- Antonino Ganini (1763–1795 Died)
- Pietro Fedele Grisolia (1797–1809 Died)

Territory Added: 1818 from the suppressed Diocese of Belcastro, Diocese of Strongoli, and Diocese of Umbriatico

Territory Added: 1818 the former Diocese of Cerenzia was added from the split Diocese of Cariati e Cerenzia with the Diocese of Cariati continuing on as a separate diocese

- Salvatore Maria Pignattaro (1818–1823 Confirmed, Archbishop (Personal Title) of Isernia)
- Giuseppe Giovanni Vincenzo (Lodovico) de Gallo Laculebero (1824–1848 Died)
- Annibale-Raffaele Montalcini (1848 –1861 Died)
- Alessandro de Risio (1872–1896 Resigned)
- Nicola Piccirilli (1896–1904 Appointed, Archbishop of Conza e Campagna)
- Carmelo Pujia (1905–1927 Appointed, Archbishop of Reggio Calabria)
- Antonio Galati (1927–1946 Died)
- Giovanni Francesco Dadone (1952–1963 Appointed, Archbishop (Personal Title) of Fossano)
- Michele Federici (1963–1973 Appointed, Archbishop (Personal Title) of Veroli-Frosinone)
- Giuseppe Agostino (1973–1986 Appointed, Archbishop of Crotone-Santa Severina)

United: 30 September 1986 with the Diocese of Crotone to form the Archdiocese of Crotone-Santa Severina
