= Archdiocese of Gaeta =

Roman Catholic archdiocese in Italy

Archdiocese of Gaeta Archidioecesis Caietana

Catholic
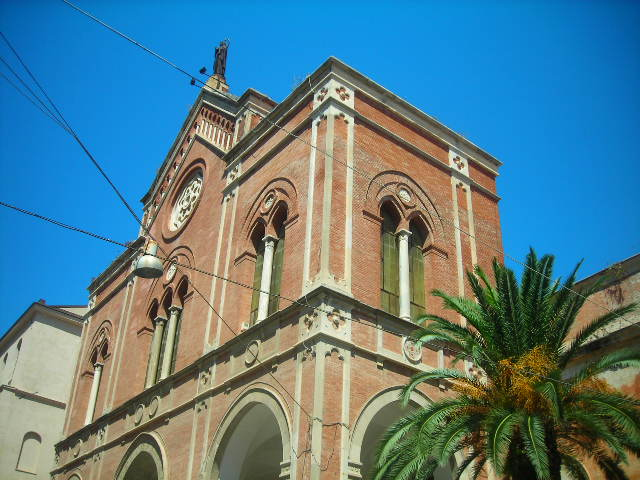
- Gaeta Cathedral

Location
- Country: Italy
- Ecclesiastical province: Immediately exempt to the Holy See

Statistics
- Area: 760 km^{2} (290 sq mi)
- Population: Total; Catholics: (as of 2023); 163,680; 158,159 (94.8%)
- Parishes: 57

Information
- Denomination: Catholic
- Sui iuris church: Latin Church
- Rite: Roman Rite
- Established: 8th century
- Cathedral: Cathedral of Saints Erasmus and Marcian and St. Mary of the Assumption (Gaeta)
- Patron saint: St. Erasmus; St. Marcian; Our Lady of Civita; St. Albina
- Secular priests: 79 (Archdiocesan); 19 Permanent Deacons

Current leadership
- Pope: Leo XIV
- Archbishop: Luigi Vari
- Vicar General: Mariano Parisella
- Bishops emeritus: archbishop Fabio Bernardo D'Onorio, O.S.B.

Website
- www.arcidiocesigaeta.it

The Archdiocese of Gaeta (Latin: Archidioecesis Caietana) is a Latin Church ecclesiastical territory or archdiocese of the Catholic Church in Lazio, Italy. The archbishop's cathedra is located in the Cathedral of Saints Erasmus and Marcian and St. Mary of the Assumption in the episcopal see of Gaeta. A non-metropolitan see, the archdiocese is exempt, immediately subject to the Holy See. The current archbishop of Gaeta is Luigi Vari, ordained on April 21, 2016 by Pope Francis.

== History ==
By mandate of Pope Gregory I in October 590, on the petition of Bishop Bacaudas of Formiae, the diocese of Minturno (Minturnae), which was completely destitute of both clergy and people, was added to the see of Formia, which was itself desolate, and Minturnae's income, rights, and privileges were transferred to the See of Formiae. In April 597, following the death of Bishop Bacaudas, Pope Gregory appointed Bishop Agnellus of Terracina as Apostolic Visitor of Formiae, instructing him to summon the clergy and people to elect a successor, and stating that no priest from outside the diocese should be elected, unless no acceptable candidate could be found in the diocese of Formiae. The successful candidate was Alvinus, who, in October 598, received permission to use sanctuaries of martyrs to build a basilica.

The importance of Gaeta dates from 846, when Constantine, Bishop of Formiae, fled there and established his residence. In or soon after 999 Bishop Bernard of Gaeta annexed the see of Traetto. The earliest church in Gaeta was S. Lucia, which was built in the 8th or 9th century, but does not appear in the written record until 986. The next-oldest was S. Maria del Parco (S. Maria Assunta), in which the remains of S. Erasmus were deposited in 842, to keep them from desecration by the Saracens. The remains of S. Marcellus were brought from Syracuse secretly, for the same reason, and hidden in S. Maria del Parco; and, when the secret was revealed in 917, piety and patriotism moved Bishop Bonus and the Hypati, Giovanni and Docibilis, to begin construction of a more suitable and imposing basilica, in the romanesque style, to replace the little S. Maria del Parco. The cathedral was dedicated by Pope Paschal II personally on 3 February 1106.

Pope Paschal died in January 1118, and immediately after the election of his successor, Pope Gelasius II (Giovanni Gaetani) on 24 January, the new pope was compelled by the violence of the Frangipane family to flee the city. By way of the Tiber River, the papal party reached Porto, but then had to take to the sea for a rough voyage to Terracina, and from there to Gaeta. On 10 March 1118, he was consecrated and crowned pope in Gaeta. The papal court stayed in Gaeta through the rest of Lent, but celebrated Easter on April 14 in Capua.

A series of large earthquakes, which began on 1 June 1231, severely damaged buildings from Rome to the Capua, and under Bishop Peter, in 1255, it became necessary to rebuild the cathedral, to which project Pope Alexander IV donated 50 ounces of gold. The new cathedral incorporated the old, as a kind of "double cathedral".

The cathedral was staffed and administered by a chapter, which consisted of four dignities (headed by the archpriest), and sixteen canons. Two of the canons were designated the theologus and the penitentiarus, in accordance with the decrees of the Council of Trent.

=== Election of 1276 ===
A copy of the Bull of Confirmation of Bishop Bartholomew, dated 21 December 1276, provides useful details about the workings of an episcopal election in Gaeta. On the death of Bishop Benvenuto, the Archpriest and Chapter of Gaeta fixed a date for the election, summoning all who ought to be present and all who wished to attend. On the day, they decided to proceed by the "Way of Scrutiny" (one of three means authorized by Canon Law), and elected three scrutineers, two Canons and the Prior of S. Silvinianus in Gaeta, to collect their own and the other votes and make them public. The Chapter had twenty-one votes, and four Priors of churches in Gaeta also had votes. Seventeen Canons and the four Priors voted for Bartholomew, one of the Canons of Gaeta; the rest voted for Canon Leo Proia. Canon Petrus Bocaterela announced the result and declared Bartholomew elected. Some of the losing party suggested that the election should be contested, but Canon Proia resigned his rights. The results were then sent to Pope John XXI, who had just been elected pope on 8 September 1276, and was living at Viterbo at the time. The pope had the bishop-elect's reputation and the canonical validity of the election investigated, and accepted the result that the election should be confirmed. The bull was duly drawn up, signed, and copies sent to Bishop-elect Bartholomew, to the Archpriest and Chapter, to the clergy of the diocese of Gaeta, and to the people of Gaeta.

When Pope Gregory XII was deposed by the Council of Pisa on 5 June 1409, he fled from Cividale to Gaeta. There he held meetings with King Ladislaus of Naples. Ladislaus had been crowned in Gaeta on 29 May 1390, by the papal legate, Cardinal Angelo Accaiuoli, and had a palace there, where his mother resided. During this time, the papal chamberlain Paolo, dressed in the papal red cassock, was impersonating Gregory XII elsewhere. Gregory remained in Gaeta until 1411, until King Ladislas repudiated him and took up Pope John XXIII. Gregory was compelled to seek safety in Rimini.

=== Post-Napoleonic Italy ===
In 1806, Gaeta was occupied by French forces under the command of General Masséna, who had been sent to install Napoleon's brother Joseph as King of Naples. The title of Duke of Gaeta was assigned to Joseph Bonaparte's minister of finance, Charles Gaudin. French laws were applied to the kingdom, which, among other things, meant the abolition of the mendicant Orders, and the reassignment of their churches and convents to civic purposes. The French were driven out in 1815.

Following the defeat and exile of Napoleon, the Congress of Vienna, and the return of Pope Pius VII from imprisonment in France, it became necessary to restore good order in the Church, and to revise the terms of previous concordats with various European powers. The Kingdom of Naples proved a difficult case, since its ruler refused to acknowledge the feudal overlordship of the papacy over southern Italy and Sicily. Finally, after changing its name to "The Kingdom of the Two Sicilies" and repudiating the old feudal subordination, a concordat was signed with King Ferdinand on 16 February 1818, which was ratified by Pope Pius VII on 7 March 1818. Among other items, it was agreed that the reduction in the number of dioceses, which had been promised in the Concordat of 1741, would actually be carried out. On the same day, in a separate document, the King of the Two Sicilies was granted the privilege of nominating all of the archbishops and bishops of the kingdom.

On 27 June 1818 Pius VII, signed the bull "De Utiliori", which carried out the terms of the reorganization of dioceses agreed to in the Concordat. The cathedral church of Fondi was suppressed, and its city and diocese were permanently added and aggregated to the diocese of Gaeta.

Like other capitals in Europe, Rome experienced the pain of revolution in the spring of 1848. Several times, Pius IX was offered the leadership of the movement for the unification of Italy, but each time he refused. On 15 November 1848, Count Pellegrino Rossi, Pius IX's Minister of the Interior was assassinated. During the night of 24 November, Pius fled from Rome in the disguise of a simple priest. On 29 November, he took up residence in Gaeta, in the Kingdom of the Two Sicilies, where he lived until the following summer. On December 31, 1848, Pius IX raised the diocese to archiepiscopal rank, but without suffragans; the change was purely honorary. On 9 February 1849, the Pope was deposed from his political office as sovereign of the Papal States and Rome, since he had abandoned his station. He departed Gaeta for Naples on 4 September 1849.

=== Reorganization ===
Following the Second Vatican Council, and in accordance with the norms laid out in the council's decree, Christus Dominus chapter 40, major changes were made in the ecclesiastical administrative structure of southern Italy. Wide consultations had taken place with the bishops and other prelates who would be affected. Action, however, was deferred, first by the death of Pope Paul VI on 6 August 1978, then the death of Pope John Paul I on 28 September 1978, and the election of Pope John Paul II on 16 October 1978. Pope John Paul II issued a decree, "Quamquam Ecclesia", on 30 April 1979, ordering the changes. Three ecclesiastical provinces were abolished entirely: those of Conza, Capua, and Sorrento. Once a suffragan of the archdiocese of Capua, the archdiocese was subsequently exempted (i.e. directly subject to the Pope).

== Territory and parishes ==
The archdiocese covers a surface of 760 km^{2} (290 sq mi).

Presently, it is divided into four districts called foranie, which are centered on Gaeta itself, and the former sees of Fondi, Formia and Minturno.

Among the notable bishops of Gaeta were: Francesco Patrizio (1460), friend of Pius II, author of a work in nine books, De Regno et De Institutione Regis, dedicated to Alfonso, Duke of Calabria; and Tommaso de Vio, better known as the famous Thomas Cajetan, a Dominican theologian and Papal diplomat.

== Bishops ==
...

- Camplus (attested 787, 788)

...

- Joannes (attested c. 830)

...

- Constantinus (attested 846–855)
- Leo (attested 861)
- Ramfus (attested 867)

...

- Deusdedit (attested 899–910)

...

- Bonus (attested c. 917)

...

- Petrus (attested 933–936)

...

- Marinus (attested 955)

...

- Stephanus (attested 972–983)
- Leo, O.S.B. (attested 995)
- Bernardus (attested 997–1047)
- Leo (1049–1089)
- Rainaldus, O.S.B. (attested 1090–1094)
- Albertus (attested 1105–1119)
- Richardus, O.S.B. (attested 1124–1145)
- Theodinus, O.S.B.
- Trasmundus, O.S.B.
- Giacinto (attested 1152–1159)
- Rainaldus, O.S.B. (1169–1171)
- Riccardus (attested 1175)
- Petrus (attested 1177–1200)

=== 1200 to 1500 ===
- Aegidius 1200– after 1210)
- Gualterius (attested 1220)
- Adenolfus (attested 1219–1240)
- Petrus de Terracina, O.P. (1252–1255)
- Benvenutus (1256–1275)
- Bartholomaeus (1276– ? )
- Matthaeus Mirabello (1290–1305)
- Franciscus, O.Min. (1306–1321)
- Franciscus Gattola (1321-1340)
- Antonius de Aribandis (1341–1348)
- Rogerius Frixiae (1348–1375?)
- Joannes (1375–1381?)
- Petrus (1381–1395) Roman Obedience
- Franciscus Augustinus, O.E.S.A. (1395–1397)
- Ubertinus, O.Min. (1397–1399)
- Nicolaus, O.S.B. (1399–1404)
- Marino Merula (1404–1422)
- Antonio de Zagarolo (1422–1427)
- Giovanni de Normandis (1427–1440)
- Felice Fajadelli, O.P. (1441–1444)
- Jacobus de Navarra (1444–1463?)
- Francesco Patrizi (1463–1494)
- Paolo Odierna (1494–1506)

=== Since 1500 ===
- Fernando Herrera (1506–1518)
- Galeazzo Butringario (1518) Bishop-elect
- Cardinal Tommaso De Vio, O.P. (1519–1534)
- Cardinal Esteban Gabriel Merino (1535–1535)
- Pedro Flores (1537–1540)
- Antonio Lunello (1541–1565)
- Pietro Lunello (1566–1587)
- Alfonso Laso Sedeño (1587–1596)
- Giovanni de Gantes (1598–1604)
- Domingo de Oña (Pedro de Oña), O. de M. (1605–1626)
- Jacinto del Cerro, O.P. (1634–1635)
- Jerónimo Domín Funes, O. Carm. (1637–1650)
- Gabriel Ortiz de Orbé (1651–1661)
- Antonio de Paredes, C.R.S.A. (1662–1662)

Sede vacante (1662–1665)

- Baltasar Valdés y Noriega (1665–1667)

Sede vacante (1667–1670)

- Martín Ibáñez y Villanueva, O.SS.T. (1670–1675)
- Antonio del Río Colmenares (1676–1678)
- Lorenzo Mayers Caramuel, O. de M. (1678–1683)
- José Sanz de Villaragut, O.F.M. (1683–1693)
- José Guerrero de Torres, O.E.S.A. (1693–1720)
- Carlo Pignatelli, C.R. (1722–1730)
- Santiago Piñaque, O. Carm. (1730–1737)
- Francesco Lanfreschi (1737–1738)
- Gennaro Carmignani, C.R. (1738–1770)
- Carlo Pergamo (1771–1785)

Sede vacante (1785–1792)

- Gennaro Clemente Francone (1792–1797)
- Riccardo Capece Minutolo, O.S.B. (1797–1801)
- Michele Sanseverino (1805–1812)
- Francesco Saverino Buonomo (1818–1827)
- Luigi Maria Parisio (1827–1854)

=== Archbishops ===
- Filippo Cammarota (1854–1876)
- Nicola (Francisco Saverio) Contieri, O.Bas. (1876–1891 Resigned)
- Francesco Niola (1891–1920)
- Pasquale Berardi (1921–1925 Resigned)
- Dionigio Casaroli (1926–1966)
- Lorenzo Gargiulo (1966–1973 Resigned)
- Luigi Maria Carli (1973–1986 Died)
- Vincenzo Maria Farano (1986–1997 Retired)
- Pier Luigi Mazzoni (1997–2007 Retired)
- Fabio Bernardo D'Onorio, O.S.B. (2007–2016 Retired)
- Luigi Vari (2016– )

== See also ==
- Gaeta Cathedral
- Churches of Gaeta

== Books ==
- Gams, Pius Bonifatius (1873). Series episcoporum Ecclesiae catholicae: quotquot innotuerunt a beato Petro apostolo (in Latin). Ratisbon: Typis et Sumptibus Georgii Josephi Manz. pp. 880–881.
- Eubel, Conradus, ed. (1913). Hierarchia catholica (in Latin). Vol. Tomus 1 (second ed.). Münster: Libreria Regensbergiana.
- Eubel, Conradus, ed. (1914). Hierarchia catholica (in Latin). Vol. Tomus 2 (second ed.). Münster: Libreria Regensbergiana.
- Gauchat, Patritius (Patrice) (1935). Hierarchia catholica (in Latin). Vol. Tomus IV (1592-1667). Münster: Libraria Regensbergiana.
- Gulik, Guilelmus (1923). Eubel, Conradus (ed.). Hierarchia catholica (in Latin). Vol. Tomus 3 (second ed.). Münster: Libreria Regensbergiana.
- Ritzler, Remigius; Sefrin, Pirminus (1952). Hierarchia catholica medii et recentis aevi V (1667-1730) (in Latin). Patavii: Messagero di S. Antonio.
- Ritzler, Remigius; Sefrin, Pirminus (1958). Hierarchia catholica medii et recentis aevi (in Latin). Vol. Tomus VI (1730-1799). Patavii: Messagero di S. Antonio.
- Ritzler, Remigius; Sefrin, Pirminus (1968). Hierarchia Catholica medii et recentioris aevi sive summorum pontificum, S. R. E. cardinalium, ecclesiarum antistitum series... A pontificatu Pii PP. VII (1800) usque ad pontificatum Gregorii PP. XVI (1846) (in Latin). Vol. VII. Monasterii: Libr. Regensburgiana.
- Remigius Ritzler; Pirminus Sefrin (1978). Hierarchia catholica Medii et recentioris aevi... A Pontificatu PII PP. IX (1846) usque ad Pontificatum Leonis PP. XIII (1903) (in Latin). Vol. VIII. Il Messaggero di S. Antonio.
- Pięta, Zenon (2002). Hierarchia catholica medii et recentioris aevi... A pontificatu Pii PP. X (1903) usque ad pontificatum Benedictii PP. XV (1922) (in Latin). Vol. IX. Padua: Messagero di San Antonio. ISBN 978-88-250-1000-8.

=== Studies ===
- D'Avino, Vincenzo (1848). Cenni storici sulle chiese arcivescovili, vescovili e prelatizie (nullius) del Regno delle Due Sicilie, Napoli 1848, pp. 237–240. (in Italian)
- D’Onofrio, M. (2003). "La Cattedrale di Gaeta nel medioevo," in: L. Cardi (ed.), Pio IX a Gaeta (25 novembre 1848 - 4 settembre 1849), Atti del Convegno di studi (Gaeta, 13 dicembre 1998 - 24 ottobre 1999) Marina di Minturno 2003, pp. 239–262. (in Italian)
- Cappelletti, Giuseppe (1870). Le Chiese d'Italia dalla loro origine sino ai nostri giorni, Vol. XXI, Venezia 1870, pp. 334–345. (in Italian)
- Codex diplomaticus Cajetanus (in Latin). Vol. Tomus primus. Montecassino: Typis Archicœnobii Montis Casini. 1887. pp. 22–23, no. XIII.
- Kamp, Norbert (1973). Kirche und Monarchie im staufischen Königreich Sizilien. Prosopographische Grundlegung. Bistümer und Bischöfe des Königreichs 1194-1266. 1. Abruzzen und Kampanien, Münich 1973, pp. 81–87. (in German)
- Kehr, Paul Fridolin (1935). Italia Pontificia, Vol. VIII, Berlin 1935, pp. 80–92. (in Latin)
- Ferraro, Salvatore (1901). Memorie Religiose e Civili della Città di Gaeta, Napoli 1903. (in Italian)
- Skinner, Patricia (1995). Family Power in Southern Italy: The Duchy of Gaeta and Its Neighbours, 850-1139. Cambridge University Press. ISBN 978-0-521-52205-2.
- Ughelli, Ferdinando; Coleti, Niccolò (1717). Italia sacra sive De Episcopis Italiae, et insularum adjacentium (in Latin). Vol. Tomus primus (1) (editio secunda, aucta et emendata ed.). Venice: apud Sebastianum Coleti. pp. 526–546.
