= Diocese of Frosinone-Veroli-Ferentino =

Latin Catholic ecclesiastical jurisdiction in Italy

Coordinates: 41°38′N 13°21′E

Diocese of Frosinone-Veroli-Ferentino Dioecesis Frusinatensis-Verulana-Ferentina

Catholic
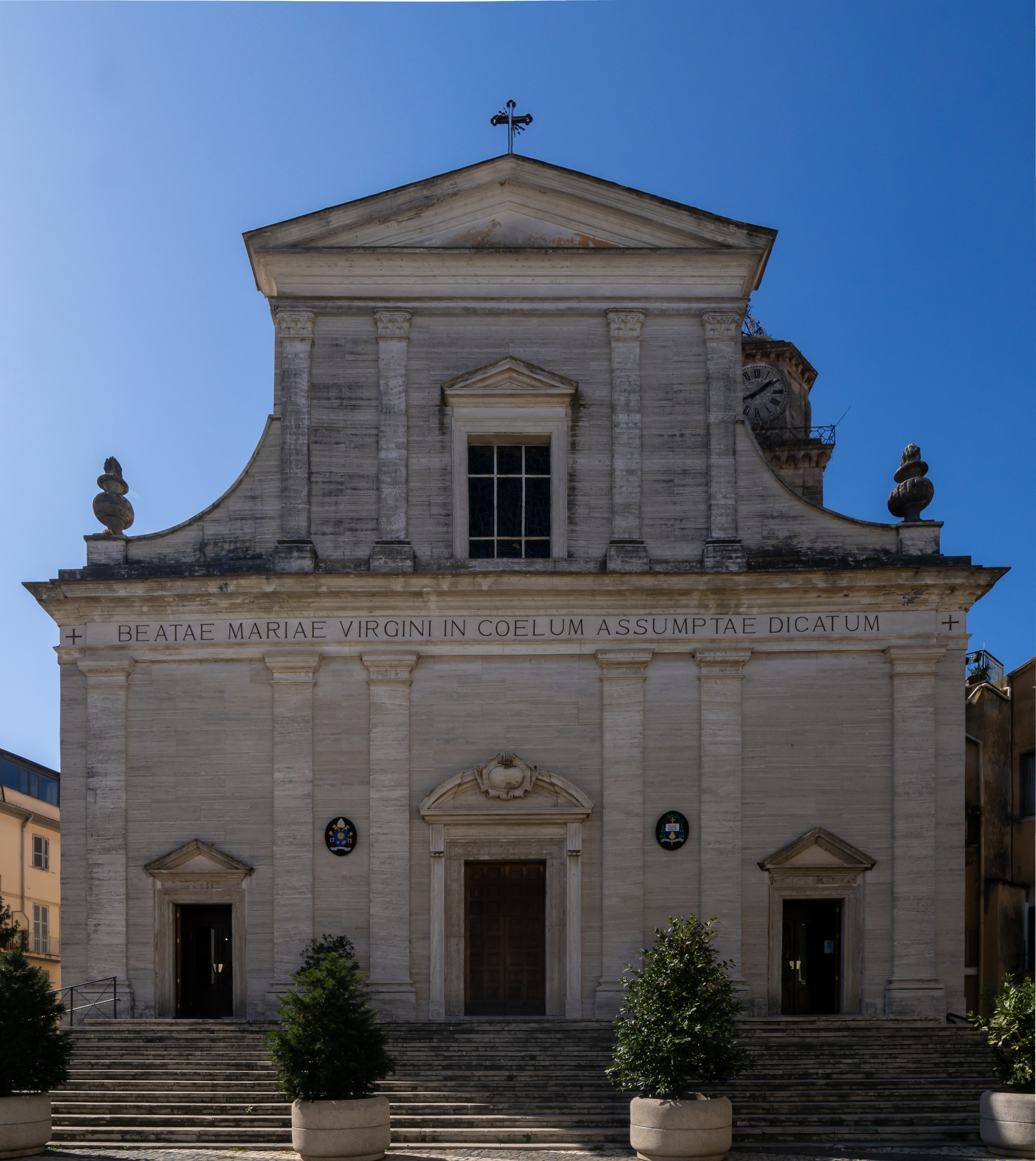
- Frosinone Cathedral

Location
- Country: Italy
- Ecclesiastical province: Immediately exempt to the Holy See

Statistics
- Area: 804 km^{2} (310 sq mi)
- Population: Total; Catholics: (as of 2023); 176,678 ▼; 166,700 (est.) ▼
- Parishes: 83 ▲

Information
- Denomination: Catholic Church
- Sui iuris church: Latin Church
- Rite: Roman Rite
- Established: by 8th century
- Cathedral: Cattedrale di S. Maria Assunta (Frosinone)
- Co-cathedral: Concattedrale di S. Andrea Apostolo (Veroli); Concattedrale di Ss. Giovanni e Paolo (Ferentino)
- Secular priests: 74 (diocesan) ▼14 (Religious Orders) ▼9 Permanent Deacons ▲

Current leadership
- Pope: Leo XIV
- Bishop: Santo Marcianò
- Bishops emeritus: Ambrogio Spreafico

Map
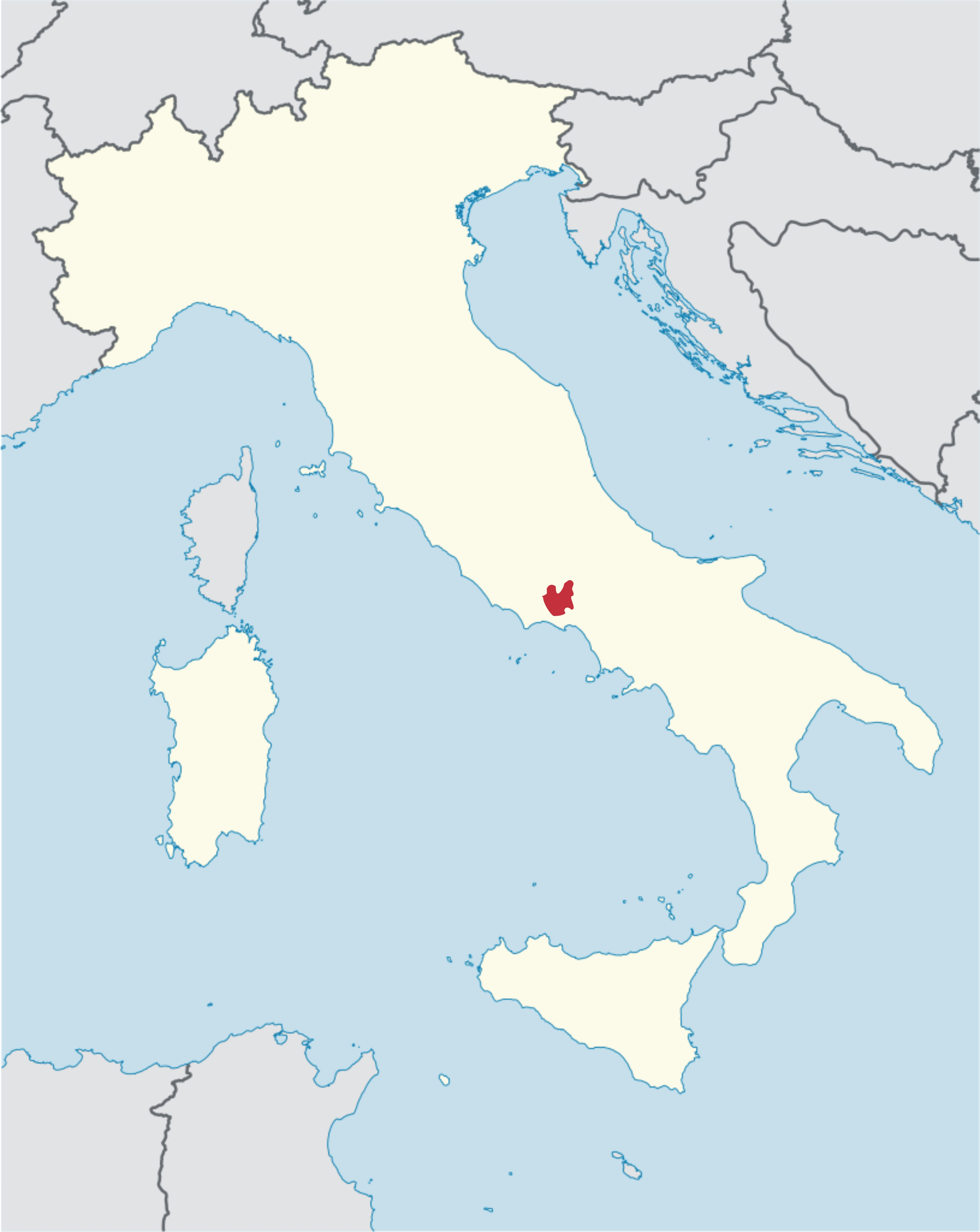

Website
- www.diocesifrosinone.it

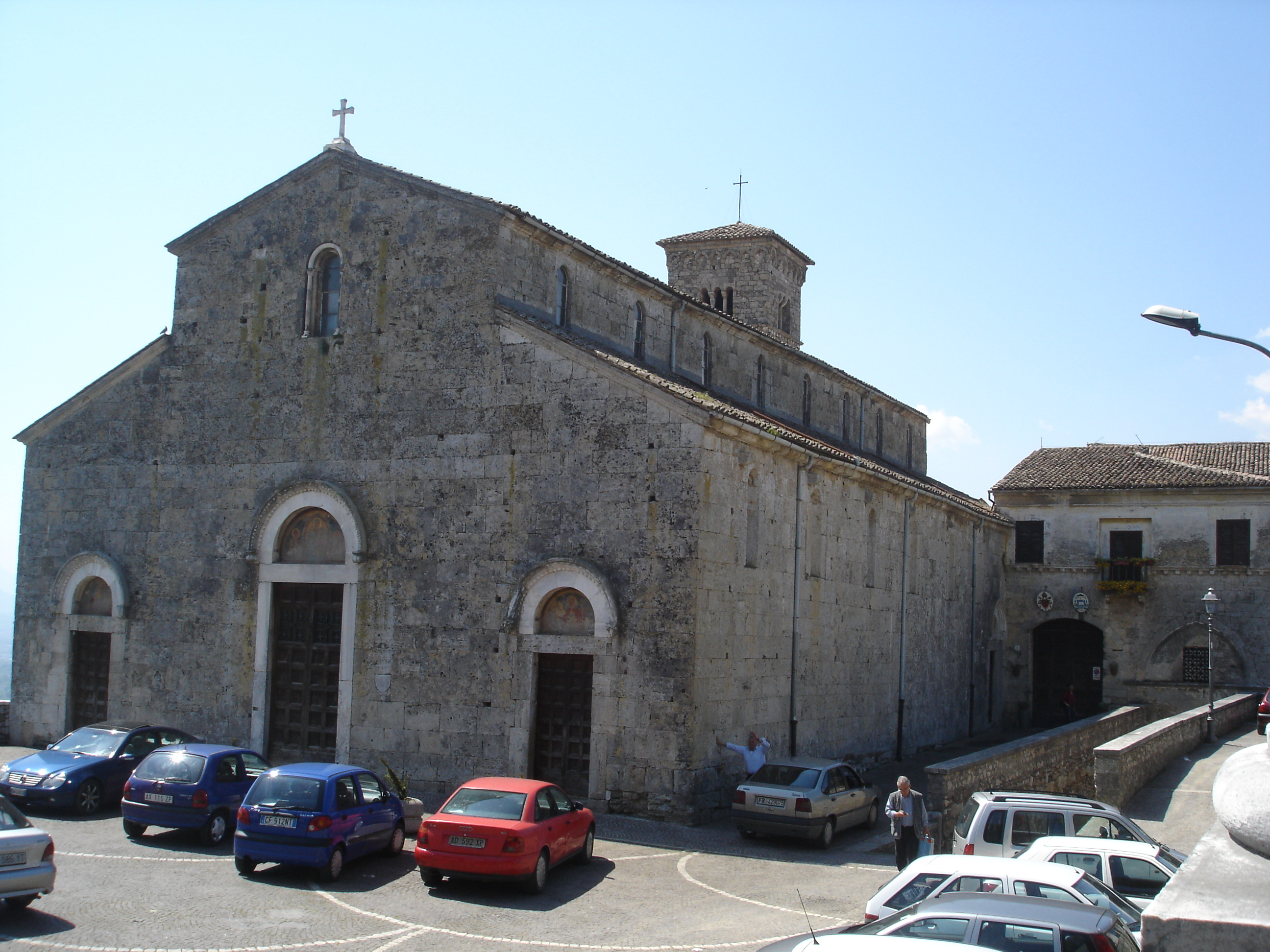
Co-cathedral in Ferentino

The Diocese of Frosinone-Veroli-Ferentino (Latin: Dioecesis Frusinatensis-Verulana-Ferentina) is a Latin Church ecclesiastical territory or diocese of the Catholic Church in Italy. It has existed since 1986. In that year, the Diocese of Ferentino was united into the Diocese of Veroli-Frosinone, which was the name of the historic Diocese of Veroli from 1956. It is immediately exempt to the Holy See and not part of an ecclesiastical province.

== History ==
Veroli was only 52 mi (84 km) from Rome, and therefore an excellent benefice for a prelate who was employed in the Roman Curia.

In a bull of 18 June 1081 Pope Gregory VII confirmed the extent of the territory of the diocese of Veroli for Bishop Albert. Pope Urban II confirmed the possessions of the Church of Veroli in a bull of 2 July 1097, and the provisions of the bull were repeated by Pope Paschal II in a bull of 4 September 1108, written for the benefit of Bishop Albert.

Pope Alexander III, in exile from Rome, lived with his Court at Veroli from 16 March 1170 to 10 September 1170. At some point during his reign, Pope Alexander determined that the number of Canons in the Cathedral of Saint Andrew in Veroli should be sixteen.

Pope Lucius III left Anagni and sought refuge in Veroli, from 27 March 1184 to 28 May 1184.

On 8 September 1351, Veroli was shaken by a major earthquake, while the clergy were singing Vespers in the cathedral. The co-cathedral of S. Salome was completely ruined, and the saint's remains were buried in the rubble for more than six weeks. The entire city of Veroli was heavily damaged.

The first steps toward the foundation of an episcopal seminary in the diocese of Veroli were taken by Bishop Girolamo Asteo (1608–1626), forty-eight years after the Council of Trent had decreed that every diocese ought to have a seminary for the education of the clergy. The first students did not enter the institution until 1652.

On 15 May 1863, Pope Pius IX paid a formal visit to Veroli, "to raise the morale of the inhabitants of the area."

In 1818, when the diocese of Fondi was suppressed and its territory handed over to the diocese of Gaeta, immediate protest were lodged by the town of Vallecorsa, who wished to belong to the Papal States and the civil province of Rome, a protest which was entered again and again over the following century. Finally, on 21 March 1921, Pope Benedict XV issued the bull "Sedis Apostolicae", removing Vallecorsa from the archdiocese of Gaeta and annexing it to the diocese of Veroli.

=== Diocesan synods ===
Bishop Ortensio Battisti (1567–1594) presided over two diocesan synods between 1568 and 1593. Bishop Eugenio Fucci (1594–1608) held a diocesan synod. A diocesan synod was held by Bishop Eugenio Fucchi between 1596 and 1608. A diocesan synod was held by Bishop Fortunato Maurizi (1856–1868) on 28–30 June 1863.

=== Name change ===
By 1956, the Vatican had become aware of changing settlement and employment patterns in cities and towns throughout Italy. In central Lazio, Frosinone had long since become the largest city, as well as the regional capital and seat of magistrates and public services (from the early 19th century). Pope Pius XII, therefore, authorized the Consistorial Congregation in the papal government to issue a decree, adding the name of Frosinone to that of the diocese of Veroli. The decree of 29 February 1956 ordered that the title of the diocese and the title of the bishop should be Verulanus-Frusinatensis.

=== Diocesan reorganization ===
The Second Vatican Council, in order to ensure that all Catholics received proper spiritual attention, decreed the reorganization of the diocesan structure of Italy and the consolidation of small and struggling dioceses, in particular those with financial and personnel problems. It also decreed that the natural population units of people, together with the civil jurisdictions and social institutions that compose their organic structure, should be preserved as far as possible as units.

On 18 February 1984, the Vatican and the Italian State signed a new and revised concordat. Based on the revisions, a set of Normae was issued on 15 November 1984, which was accompanied in the next year, on 3 June 1985, by enabling legislation. According to the agreement, the practice of having one bishop govern two separate dioceses at the same time, aeque personaliter, was abolished. This applied to the dioceses of Veroli and Frosinone. The Vatican therefore continued consultations which had begun under Pope John XXIII for the merging of dioceses. On 30 September 1986, Pope John Paul II ordered that the dioceses of Veroli, Frosinone, and Ferentino be merged into one diocese with one bishop, with the Latin title Dioecesis Frusinatensis-Verulana-Ferentina. The seat of the diocese was to be in Frosinone, whose cathedral was to serve as the cathedral of the merged dioceses. The cathedrals in Veroli and Ferentino were to become co-cathedrals, and the cathedral Chapters were each to be a Capitulum Concathedralis. There was to be only one diocesan Tribunal, in Frosinone, and likewise one seminary, one College of Consultors, and one Priests' Council. The territory of the new diocese was to include the territory of the former dioceses of Veroli, Frosinone, and Ferentino.

== Bishops ==
=== Diocese of Veroli ===
Erected: 8th century

==== to 1200 ====
- Martinus (743)

...

- Arnaldus (attested in 853)

...

- Ildebrandus (c. 868)

...

- Joannes (attested 959–964)

[Aufredus]
...

- Sergius (attested 1024)

...

- Girardus (attested 1036)

...

- Benedictus (attested 1050)
- Placidus (attested 1059)
- Honestus (attested 1071–1075)

...

- Albertus (attested 1081–1108)
- Agostino (1108?–1111);
- Letus (1111–after 1125).
- Leo (by 1140–after 1159).
- Faramondo (1160–1181);
- Ambrosius (1181–1188)
- Robertus (1188–1189
- Oddo (1190–1212)

==== 1200 to 1500 ====
- Letus (attested 1217)
- Joannes (1223–1250)

Sede vacante (1250–1252)

- Joannes (1252–1253)
- Joannes (1253–1258)
- Andreas (attested 1259)
- Gregorius (1261–1278)
- Lotherius (1280–1314)

Sede vacante (1314–1317)

- Thomas (1317–1329)
- Adjutorius (1331–1354)
- Guido (1355–1363)
- Joannes de Prato (1363–1379?)
- Nicolaus Rosati (1379– ? )Avignon Obedience
- Francesco Bellati 1384–1386) Roman Obedience
- Bartholomaeus (1396–1420)
- Benedictus (1422–1427)
- Clemente Bartolomei, O.S.A. (1427–1457)
- Angelo de Cavis (1457–1463)
- Fabrizio Novelli (1464–1468 Died)
- Giovanni Ponziani (1468–1503)

==== 1500 to 1800 ====
- Cardinal Ennio Filonardi (1503–1538)
- Antonio Filonardi (1538–1560)
- Benedetto Salino (1560–1567)
- Ortensio Battisti (1567–1594)
- Eugenio Fucci (1594–1608)
- Girolamo Asteo, O.F.M. Conv. (1608–1626)
- Baglione Carradoli (1626–1628)
- Vincenzo Lanteri, C.O. (1628–1649)
- Alessandro Argoli (1651–1654)
- Francesco Lambardi (1655–1660)
- Francesco Angelucci (1660–1674 Died)
- Riccardo Annibaleschi della Molara (1675–1689)
- Domenico de Zaoli (1690–1708 Resigned)
- Ludovico Anselmo Gualtieri (1708–1715)
- Lorenzo Tartagni (1715–1751 Resigned)
- Pietro Saverio Antonini (1751–1761 Resigned)
- Giovanni Battista Jacobini (1761–1786 Died)
- Antonio Rossi (1786–1811)

==== 1800 to 1955 ====
- Francesco Maria Cipriani, O.S.B. (1814–1843 Died)
- Mariano Venturi (1844–1854)
- Luigi Zannini (1854–1857 Resigned)
- Fortunato Maurizi (1856–1868)
- Giovanni Battista Maneschi (1868–1891)
- Paolo Fioravanti (1891–1909)
- Luigi Fantozzi, C.Pp.S. (1909–1931 Retired)
- Francesco de Filippis (1931–1942 Appointed Archbishop of Brindisi)
- Emilio Baroncelli (1943–1955 Appointed Bishop of Recanati)

=== Diocese of Veroli-Frosinone ===
Name Changed: 29 February 1956

- Carlo Livraghi (1956–1962 Resigned)
- Luigi Morstabilini (1962–1964 Appointed Bishop of Brescia)
- Giuseppe Marafini (1964–1973 Died)
- Michele Federici (1973–1980 Died)
- Angelo Cella, M.S.C. (1981–1999 Retired)

=== Diocese of Frosinone-Veroli-Ferentino ===
United: 30 September 1986 with the Diocese of Ferentino

- Salvatore Boccaccio (1999–2008 Died)
- Ambrogio Spreafico (2008– )

== See also ==
- Catholic Church in Italy

== Books ==
- Cappelletti, Giuseppe (1847). Le chiese d'Italia della loro origine sino ai nostri giorni (in Italian). Vol. Tomo sesto (6). Venezia: G. Antonelli. pp. 467–510.
- Eubel, Conradus, ed. (1913). Hierarchia catholica. Vol. Tomus 1 (second ed.). Münster: Libreria Regensbergiana. (in Latin)
- Eubel, Conradus, ed. (1914). Hierarchia catholica. Vol. Tomus 2 (second ed.). Münster: Libreria Regensbergiana.
- Gulik, Guilelmus (1923). Eubel, Conradus (ed.). Hierarchia catholica. Vol. Tomus 3 (second ed.). Münster: Libreria Regensbergiana.
- Gams, Pius Bonifatius (1873). Series episcoporum Ecclesiae catholicae: quotquot innotuerunt a beato Petro apostolo (in Latin). Ratisbon: Typis et Sumptibus Georgii Josephi Manz. pp. 738–739.
- Gauchat, Patritius (Patrice) (1935). Hierarchia catholica. Vol. Tomus IV (1592-1667). Münster: Libraria Regensbergiana.
- Kehr, Paul Fridolin (1907). Italia pontificia (in Latin). Vol. II: Latium. Berlin: Weidmann.
- Ritzler, Remigius; Sefrin, Pirminus (1952). Hierarchia catholica medii et recentis aevi. Vol. Tomus V (1667-1730). Patavii: Messagero di S. Antonio.
- Ritzler, Remigius; Sefrin, Pirminus (1958). Hierarchia catholica medii et recentis aevi. Vol. Tomus VI (1730-1799). Patavii: Messagero di S. Antonio.
- Ritzler, Remigius; Sefrin, Pirminus (1968). Hierarchia Catholica medii et recentioris aevi (in Latin). Vol. VII (1800–1846). Monasterii: Libreria Regensburgiana.
- Remigius Ritzler; Pirminus Sefrin (1978). Hierarchia catholica Medii et recentioris aevi (in Latin). Vol. VIII (1846–1903). Il Messaggero di S. Antonio.
- Pięta, Zenon (2002). Hierarchia catholica medii et recentioris aevi (in Latin). Vol. IX (1903–1922). Padua: Messagero di San Antonio. ISBN 978-88-250-1000-8.
- Schwartz, Gerhard (1907). Die Besetzung der Bistümer Reichsitaliens unter den sächsischen und salischen Kaisern: mit den Listen der Bischöfe, 951-1122. Leipzig: B.G. Teubner. (in lang|de)
- Ughelli, Ferdinando; Coleti, Niccolo (1717). Italia sacra (in Latin). Vol. Tomus primus. Venice: Sebastianus Coletus. pp. 1386–1401.
