= Giulio Antonio Santorio =

Italian cardinal

His Eminence Giulio Antonio Santorio
- Cardinal, Bishop of Palestrina
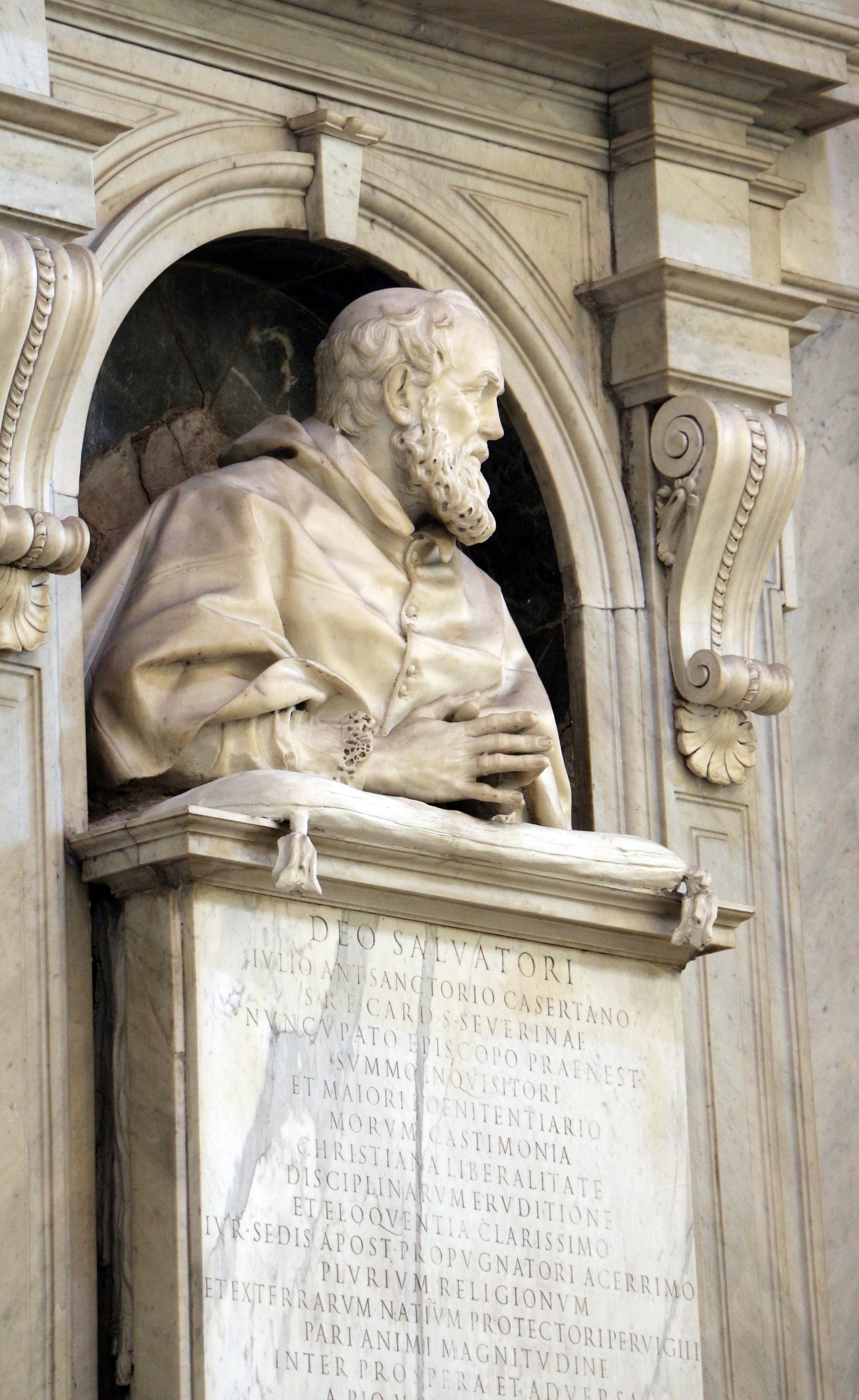
- Tomba of Giulio Antonio Santorio in the Basilica di San Giovanni in Laterano sculpted by Giuliano Finelli in 1634
- Appointed: 6 March 1566
- Installed: 12 March 1566
- Term ended: 9 January 1573
- Predecessor: Giovanni Battista Orsini
- Successor: Francesco Antonio Santorio
- Other post: Cardinal-Bishop of Palestrina
- Previous posts: Cardinal-Priest of S. Bartolomeo all’Isola (1570–1595); Cardinal-Priest of S. Maria in Trastevere (1595–1597)

Orders
- Ordination: 1557
- Consecration: 12 March 1566 by Scipione Rebiba
- Created cardinal: 17 May 1570
- Rank: Cardinal-Bishop

Personal details
- Born: Giulio Antonio Santorio; 6 June 1532 Caserta
- Died: 9 May 1602 (aged 69)
- Denomination: Roman Catholic

Giulio Antonio Santorio (6 June 1532 – 9 May 1602) was an Italian Cardinal of the Roman Catholic Church.

== Biography ==
Santorio was born in Caserta. He served as Archbishop of Santa Severina from 1566 until his death.

On 12 March 1566, Santorio was consecrated bishop by Scipione Rebiba with Annibale Caracciolo, Bishop of Isola, and Giacomo de' Giacomelli, Bishop Emeritus of Belcastro, serving as co-consecrators. Santorio was made Cardinal on 17 May 1570, and installed as the Cardinal-Priest of S. Bartolomeo all'Isola the same year, and subsequently became Cardinal-Priest of S. Maria in Trastevere in 1595 and finally in 1597 Cardinal-Bishop of Palestrina. Through his own episcopal consecration of Girolamo Bernerio, Cardinal Santorio figures in the episcopal lineage of Pope Francis, Pope Benedict XVI, and most modern bishops.

Santorio was also named as Protector of the Oriental Orthodox Churches, which included the Armenian, Coptic and Jacobite Churches, and also sent a mission to the Copts to discuss theological unity, though it failed in 1584. As such, he was also the patron of the Greek College in Rome (founded in 1576) and inspired the Congregation of the Greeks (active from 1593 to 1597 before the Propaganda fide). When Ignatius Ni'matallah arrived in 1578 in Rome, he sought especially the favour of pope Gregory XIII and cardinal Santorio. Santorio was involved in the subsequent negotiations with Ni'matallah and his brother David II Shah, the Syriac Orthodox Patriarch, about church union and recognition of David as only legitimate patriarch of Antioch but this ended in failure also. He also organised a mission to the Coptic church between 1581 and 1584.

== Episcopal succession ==
Episcopal succession of Giulio Antonio Santorio

While bishop, he served as the principal consecrator of:

- Giovanni Agostino Campanile, Bishop of Minori (1567);
- Andrea Minucci, Archbishop of Zadar (1568);
- Giovanni Battista Santorio, Bishop of Alife (1568);
- Serafino Fortibraccia, Bishop of Nemosia (1569);
- Prospero Vitelliano, Bishop of Bisignano (1569);
- Gregorio Forbicini, Bishop of Strongoli (1572);
- Ottavio Mirto Frangipani, Bishop of Caiazzo (1572);
- Francesco Antonio Santorio, Archbishop of Santa Severina (1573);
- Gaspare Cenci, Bishop of Melfi e Rapolla (1574);
- Dermot O'Cleary, Bishop of Mayo (1574);
- Massimiliano Palumbara, Archbishop of Benevento (1574);
- Giovanni Paolo Marincola, Bishop of Teano (1576);
- Giovanni Battista Soriani, Bishop of Bisceglie (1576);
- Giovanni Battista Ansaldo, Bishop of Cariati e Cerenzia (1576);
- Giovanni Bernardino Grandopoli, Bishop of Lettere-Gragnano (1576);
- Vincenzo Cutelli, Bishop of Catania (1577);
- Miguel Thomàs de Taxaquet, Bishop of Lérida (1577);
- Mario Bolognini, Archbishop of Lanciano (1579);
- Flaminio Filonardi, Bishop of Aquino (1579);
- Pietro Orsini, Coadjutor Bishop of Spoleto (1580);
- Girolamo Bentivoglio, Bishop of Corneto (1580);
- Giulio Monaco, Bishop of Lucera (1580);
- Domenico Petrucci, Bishop of Strongoli (1582);
- Nicola Stridoni, Bishop of Mylopotamos (1582);
- Leonard Abel, Titular Bishop of Sidon (1582);
- Scipione Gesualdo, Archbishop of Conza (1585);
- Enrico Caetani, Titular Patriarch of Alexandria (1585);
- Fabrizio Gallo, Bishop of Nola (1585);
- Giulio Masetti, Bishop of Reggio Emilia (1585);
- Antonello de Folgore, Bishop of Sant'Angelo dei Lombardi e Bisaccia (1585);
- Enrico Cini, Bishop of Alife (1586);
- Giovanni Battista Albani, Titular Patriarch of Alexandria (1586);
- José Esteve Juan, Bishop of Vieste (1586);
- Girolamo Bernerio, Bishop of Ascoli Piceno (1586);
- Pietro Ridolfi, Bishop of Venosa (1587);
- Bonaventura Bellemo, Bishop of Andros (1587);
- Antonio de Marchi, Bishop of Santorini (1588);
- Camillo Gualandi, Bishop of Cesena (1588);
- Giovanni Battista Costanzo, Archbishop of Cosenza (1591);
- Scipione Spina, Archbishop of Cosenza (1591);
- Napoleone Comitoli, Bishop of Perugia (1591);
- Claudio de Curtis, Bishop of Crotone (1592);
- Nicolò Stizzia, Bishop of Cefalù (1594);
- Placido della Marra, Bishop of Melfi e Rapolla (1595);
- Giulio Doffius, Bishop of Alessano (1595);
- Manuel Quero Turillo, Bishop of Cefalù (1597); and
- Alberto Drago, Bishop of Termoli (1599).

He also served as the principal co-consecrator of:

- Tiberio Carafa, Bishop of Potenza (1566);
- Tommaso Orsini, Bishop of Strongoli (1566);
- Francesco Rusticucci, Bishop of Venosa (1566);
- Archangelo de' Bianchi, Bishop of Teano (1566);
- Carlo Carafa, Bishop of Guardialfiera (1567);
- Marco Landi, Bishop of Ascoli Satriano (1567);
- Paul Burali d'Arezzo, Bishop of Piacenza (1568);
- Stanislaus Szezniski, Auxiliary Bishop of Poznań (1568);
- Marcus Teggingeri, Titular bishop of Lydda (1568);
- Organtino Scaroli, Bishop of San Marco (1569);
- Gregorio Cruz, Bishop of Martirano (1569);
- Cesare Ferrante, Bishop of Termoli (1569); and
- Giovanni Aldobrandini, Bishop of Imola (1569)

== Literary works ==
- Vita del card. Giulio Antonio Santori detto il card. di Santa Severina composta e scritta da lui medesimo, in «Archivio della R. Società di Storia Patria», voll. XII 1889 e XIII 1890
- Pro confutatione articulorum et haeresum recentiorum Haereticorum et pseudo-apostolorum, ex Utriusque Testamenti textu decerpta, in ms. Vaticanus Latinus 12233, cc. 62r-439v, Biblioteca Apostolica Vaticana
- Historia abiuratorum et haereticorum scripta et notata a Cardinali Sanctae Severinae ... De persecutionis haereticae pravitatis historia, ms. in Archivio della Congragazione per la Dottrina della Fede
