= Giovanni Battista Santorio =

Italian Catholic bishop (1592)

The Most Reverend Giovanni Battista Santorio
- Bishop of Tricarico
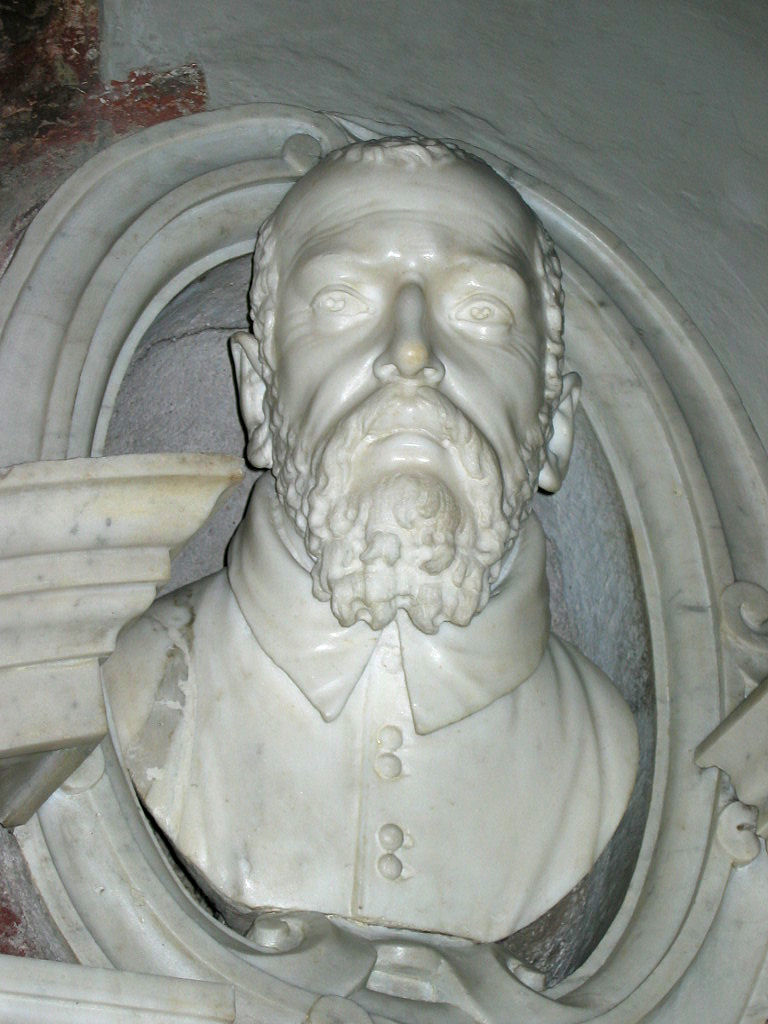
- Giovanni Battista Santorio or Giovan Battista santoro
- Church: Catholic Church
- In office: 1586–1592
- Predecessor: Nunzio Antonio de Capriolis
- Successor: Ottavio Mirto Frangipani
- Previous post: Bishop of Alife (1568–1586)

Orders
- Consecration: 13 December 1568 by Giulio Antonio Santorio

Personal details
- Died: 29 February 1592 Tricarico, Italy

Giovanni Battista Santorio or Giovan Battista Santoro (died 29 February 1592) was a Roman Catholic prelate who served as Bishop of Tricarico (1586–1592) and Bishop of Alife (1586–1592).

== Biography ==
On 19 November 1568, Giovanni Battista Santorio was appointed during the papacy of Pope Pius V as Bishop of Alife. On 13 December 1568, he was consecrated bishop by Giulio Antonio Santorio, Archbishop of Santa Severina, with Felice Peretti Montalto, Bishop of Sant'Agata de' Goti, and Umberto Locati, Bishop of Bagnoregio, serving as co-consecrators. On 8 January 1586, he was appointed during the papacy of Pope Sixtus V as Bishop of Tricarico. He served as Bishop of Tricarico until his death on 29 February 1592.

== Episcopal succession ==
Episcopal succession of Giovanni Battista Santorio

While bishop, he was the principal co-consecrator of:

- Gaspare Cenci, Bishop of Melfi e Rapolla (1574);
- Dermot O'Cleary, Bishop of Mayo (1574);
- Flaminio Filonardi, Bishop of Aquino (1579);
- Domenico Petrucci, Bishop of Strongoli (1582);
- Nicola Stridoni, Bishop of Mylopotamos (1582);
- Leonard Abel, Titular Bishop of Sidon (1582);
- Ignazio Danti (bishop), Bishop of Alatri (1583);
- Antonio Fera, Bishop of Marsico Nuovo (1584);
- Marco Pedacca, Bishop of Lacedonia (1584);
- Basilio Gradi, Bishop of Ston (1584);
- Marco Antonio Mocenigo, Bishop of Ceneda (1586); and
- Giovanni Battista Costanzo, Archbishop of Cosenza (1591).

== See also ==
- Catholic Church in Italy

== External links and additional sources ==
- Cheney, David M. "Diocese of Alife-Caiazzo". Catholic-Hierarchy.org. (for Chronology of Bishops) ^{[self-published]}
- Chow, Gabriel. "Diocese of Alife-Caiazzo". GCatholic.org. (for Chronology of Bishops) ^{[self-published]}
- Cheney, David M. "Diocese of Tricarico". Catholic-Hierarchy.org. (for Chronology of Bishops) ^{[self-published]}
- Chow, Gabriel. "Diocese of Tricarico (Italy)". GCatholic.org. (for Chronology of Bishops) ^{[self-published]}

Catholic Church titles
Preceded by Angelo Rossi (bishop)	Bishop of Alife; 1568–1586	Succeeded by Enrico Cini
Preceded by Nunzio Antonio de Capriolis	Bishop of Tricarico; 1586–1592	Succeeded by Ottavio Mirto Frangipani
