= Dermot O'Cleary =

Former Roman Catholic prelate

The Most Reverend Dermot O'Cleary
- Bishop of Mayo
- Church: Catholic Church
- Archdiocese: Diocese of Mayo
- In office: 1574–1575
- Successor: Patrick O'Healy

Orders
- Consecration: 12 March 1574 by Giulio Antonio Santorio

Personal details
- Died: 1575 County Mayo, Ireland

Dermot O'Cleary, O.F.M. or Dermitius Oclieria (died 1575) was a Roman Catholic prelate who served as Bishop of Mayo (1574–1575).

== Biography ==
Dermot O'Cleary was ordained a priest in the Order of Friars Minor. On 12 February 1574, he was appointed during the papacy of Pope Gregory XIII as Bishop of Mayo. On 12 March 1574, he was consecrated bishop by Giulio Antonio Santorio, Cardinal-Priest of San Bartolomeo all'Isola, with Giovanni Battista Santorio, Bishop of Alife, and Giuseppe Pamphilj, Bishop of Segni, serving as co-consecrators. He served as Bishop of Mayo until his death in 1575.

Catholic Church titles
Preceded by	Bishop of Mayo; 1574–1575	Succeeded by Patrick O'Healy
