= Organtino Scaroli =

Italian Roman Catholic prelate

The Most Reverend Organtino Scaroli
- Bishop of San Marco (Argentano)
- Church: Catholic Church
- Diocese: Diocese of San Marco (Argentano)
- In office: 1569-1572
- Predecessor: Guglielmo Sirleto
- Successor: Ippolito Bosco

Orders
- Consecration: 16 April 1569 by Scipione Rebiba

Personal details
- Died: 1572

Organtino Scaroli, also Organtino Scazola, (died 1572) was a Roman Catholic prelate who served as Bishop of San Marco (Argentano) (1569-1572).

== Biography ==
On 1 April 1569, Organtino Scaroli was appointed during the papacy of Pope Pius V as Bishop of San Marco (Argentano). On 16 April 1569, he was consecrated bishop by Scipione Rebiba, Cardinal-Priest of Sant'Angelo in Pescheria, with Giulio Antonio Santorio, Archbishop of Santa Severina, and Thomas Goldwell, Bishop of Saint Asaph, serving as co-consecrators. He served as Bishop of San Marco (Argentano) until his death in 1572.

== External links and additional sources ==
- Cheney, David M. "Diocese of San Marco Argentano-Scalea". Catholic-Hierarchy.org. (for Chronology of Bishops) ^{[self-published]}
- Chow, Gabriel. "Diocese of San Marco Argentano-Scalea (Italy)". GCatholic.org. (for Chronology of Bishops) ^{[self-published]}

Catholic Church titles
Preceded by Guglielmo Sirleto	Bishop of San Marco (Argentano); 1569-1572	Succeeded by Ippolito Bosco
