= Francesco Gonzaga =

Francesco Gonzaga may refer to:

- Francesco I Gonzaga (1366–1407), Lord of Mantua
- Gianfrancesco I Gonzaga, Marquess of Mantua (1395–1444)
- Francesco Gonzaga (1444–1483), cardinal
- Gianfrancesco Gonzaga (1446–1496), Count of Sabbioneta
- Francesco II Gonzaga, Marquess of Mantua (1466–1519)
- Francesco III Gonzaga, Duke of Mantua (1533–1550)
- Francesco Gonzaga (1538–1566), cardinal
- Francesco IV Gonzaga, Duke of Mantua (1586–1612)
- Francesco Gonzaga (bishop of Nola) (1602–1673)
- Francesco Gonzaga (bishop of Mantua) (died 1620)
- Francesco Gonzaga, 1st Duke of Solferino (1684–1758)

== See also ==
- House of Gonzaga
