= Fabrizio Gallo =

Most Reverend Fabrizio Gallo
- Bishop of Nola
- Church: Catholic Church
- Diocese: Diocese of Nola
- In office: 1585–1614
- Predecessor: Filippo Spinola
- Successor: Giovanni Battista Lancellotti

Orders
- Consecration: 21 September 1585 by Giulio Antonio Santorio

Personal details
- Died: 5 November 1614 Nola, Italy

Fabrizio Gallo (died 5 November 1614) was a Roman Catholic prelate who served as Bishop of Nola (1585–1614).

== Biography ==
On 1 July 1585, Fabrizio Gallo was appointed during the papacy of Pope Sixtus V as Bishop of Nola. On 21 September 1585, he was consecrated bishop by Giulio Antonio Santorio, Cardinal-Priest of San Bartolomeo all'Isola, Angelo di Cipro, Bishop Emeritus of Santorini, Marco Antonio del Tufo, Bishop of San Marco, serving as co-consecrators. He served as Bishop of Nola until his death on 5 November 1614.

== External links and additional sources ==
- Cheney, David M. "Diocese of Nola". Catholic-Hierarchy.org. (for Chronology of Bishops) ^{[self-published]}
- Chow, Gabriel. "Diocese of Nola (Italy)". GCatholic.org. (for Chronology of Bishops) ^{[self-published]}

Catholic Church titles
Preceded by Filippo Spinola	Bishop of Nola; 1585–1614	Succeeded by Giovanni Battista Lancellotti
