= Gaspare Cenci =

Italian Roman Catholic prelate

The Most Reverend Gaspare Cenci
- Bishop of Melfi e Rapolla
- Church: Catholic Church
- Diocese: Diocese of Melfi e Rapolla
- In office: 1574–1590
- Predecessor: Alessandro Ruffino
- Successor: Orazio Celsi

Orders
- Consecration: 12 March 1574 by Giulio Antonio Santorio

Gaspare Cenci was a Roman Catholic prelate who served as Bishop of Melfi e Rapolla (1574–1590).

== Biography ==
On 8 January 1574, Gaspare Cenci was appointed during the papacy of Pope Gregory XIII as Bishop of Melfi e Rapolla. On 12 Mar 1574, he was consecrated bishop by Giulio Antonio Santorio, Cardinal-Priest of San Bartolomeo all'Isola, with Giovanni Battista Santorio, Bishop of Alife, and Giuseppe Pamphilj, Bishop of Segni, serving as co-consecrators. He served as Bishop of Melfi e Rapolla until his resignation in 1590.

== Episcopal succession ==
Episcopal succession of Gaspare Cenci

While bishop, he was the principal co-consecrator of:

- Giovanni Battista Castrucci, Archbishop of Chieti (1585);
- Gian Francesco Biandrate di San Giorgio Aldobrandini, Bishop of Acqui (1585);
- Marcantonio Bizzoni, Bishop of Foligno (1586); and
- Lorenzo Celsi (bishop), Bishop of Castro del Lazio (1591).

== See also ==
- Catholic Church in Italy

== External links and additional sources ==
- Cheney, David M. "Diocese of Melfi-Rapolla-Venosa". Catholic-Hierarchy.org. (for Chronology of Bishops) ^{[self-published]}
- Chow, Gabriel. "Diocese of Melfi-Rapolla-Venosa (Italy)". GCatholic.org. (for Chronology of Bishops) ^{[self-published]}

Catholic Church titles
Preceded by Alessandro Ruffino	Bishop of Melfi e Rapolla; 1574–1590	Succeeded by Orazio Celsi
