= Giuseppe Pamphilj (bishop of Segni) =

Roman Catholic prelate

Most Reverend Giuseppe Pamphilj
- Church: Catholic Church
- Diocese: Diocese of Segni
- In office: 1570–1581
- Predecessor: Ambrogio Monticoli
- Successor: Giacomo Masini

Orders
- Consecration: 17 February 1570 by Antonio Elio

Personal details
- Born: 1525 Verona, Italy
- Died: 20 November 1581 (age 56) Segni, Italy

Giuseppe Pamphilj (also Giuseppe Panfili or Giuseppe Panphili; 1525 – 20 November 1581) was a Roman Catholic prelate who served as Bishop of Segni (1570–1581).

== Biography ==
Giuseppe Pamphilj was born in Verona, Italy in 1525. On 10 February 1570, he was appointed during the papacy of Pope Pius V as Bishop of Segni. On 17 February 1570, he was consecrated bishop by Antonio Elio, Titular Patriarch of Jerusalem, with Orazio Greco, Bishop of Lesina, and Matteo Barbabianca, Bishop of Pula, serving as co-consecrators. He served as Bishop of Segni until his death on 20 November 1581.

== Episcopal succession ==
While bishop, he was the principal consecrator of:

- Malachy O'Moloney, Bishop of Killaloe (1571);

and the principal co-consecrator of:

- Donat O'Gallagher, Bishop of Killala (1570);
- Girolamo Rusticucci, Bishop of Senigallia (1570);
- Gregorio Forbicini, Bishop of Strongoli (1572);
- Ottavio Mirto Frangipani, Bishop of Caiazzo (1572);
- Gaspare Cenci, Bishop of Melfi e Rapolla (1574); and
- Dermot O'Cleary, Bishop of Mayo (1574).

Catholic Church titles
Preceded by Ambrogio Monticoli	Bishop of Segni; 1570–1581	Succeeded by Giacomo Masini
