= Ottavio Mirto Frangipani =

Italian bishop

The Most Reverend Ottavio Mirto Frangipani Archbishop of Taranto
- Diocese: Taranto
- See: basilica di San Cataldo
- Other post: papal nuncio

Orders
- Ordination: 9 November 1572
- Consecration: 8 December 1572 by Giulio Antonio Santorio
- Rank: Archbishop

Personal details
- Born: 11 April 1544 Naples
- Died: 24 July 1612 (aged 68) Taranto
- Buried: basilica di San Cataldo
- Denomination: Catholic
- Education: University of Naples

Ottavio Mirto Frangipani (11 April 1544 – 24 July 1612) was an Italian bishop and papal diplomat, who as papal nuncio to Cologne (1587–1596) and to Brussels (1596–1606) oversaw the implementation of Tridentine reforms in the Rhineland and the Spanish Netherlands after the disruptions of the sixteenth century.

== Life ==
Frangipani was born in Naples on 11 April 1544 to Silvio Mirto and Laura della Gatta. He studied at the University of Naples, graduating in law. He was appointed bishop of Caiazzo on 19 November 1572, ten days after his ordination as a priest, and was consecrated by Giulio Antonio Santorio, Archbishop of Santa Severina on 8 December with Thomas Goldwell, Bishop of Saint Asaph, and Giuseppe Pamphilj, Bishop of Segni, serving as co-consecrators.

In 1587 he was appointed Apostolic Nuncio to Cologne, which was then in the midst of the Cologne War. He was appointed bishop of Tricarico on 9 March 1592, while in Cologne, but did not visit the diocese. As a result of his experience in Cologne he pressed for the creation of a nunciature in Brussels, arriving there as nuncio on 11 February 1596. He was active in promoting the restoration of Catholic life in the war-torn Southern Netherlands, visiting Antwerp, Arras, Liège, Namur, Tournai, Cambrai, Calais, Lille, Dunkirk and Gravelines.

On 20 June 1605 Frangipani was appointed Archbishop of Taranto and he returned to Italy to take up the post in late 1606. He died in Taranto on 24 July 1612 and was buried in his cathedral. While bishop, he was the principal consecrator of Laurentius Fabritius, Auxiliary Bishop of Cologne.

== Correspondence ==
Four volumes of Frangipani's letters as nuncio to Cologne have been published as part 2 of the series Nuntiaturberichte aus Deutschland: Die Kölner Nuntiatur, the first volume edited by Stephan Ehses (1968), the other three by Burkhard Roberg (1969–1983).

His correspondence as nuncio to Brussels has been published as three volumes in the series Analecta Vaticano-Belgica, Nonciature de Flandre, the first edited by Leon van der Essen (1924) and the other two by Armand Louant (1932, 1942).

Catholic Church titles
Preceded by Fabio Mirto Frangipani	Bishop of Caiazzo; 1572–1592	Succeeded by Horatius Acquaviva d'Aragona
Preceded by Giovanni Battista Santorio	Bishop of Tricarico; 1592–1605	Succeeded by Diomede Carafa
Preceded by Juan de Castro	Archbishop of Taranto; 1605–1612	Succeeded by Bonifazio Caetani
Preceded by Giovanni Francesco Bonomi	Apostolic Nuncio to Cologne; 1587–1596	Succeeded by Coriolano Garzadoro
Preceded by new creation	Papal nuncio to Flanders; 1596–1606	Succeeded by Decio Carafa
