= Velletri Cathedral =

Cathedral in Velletri, Lazio, Italy

Coordinates: 41.6832°N 12.7767°E

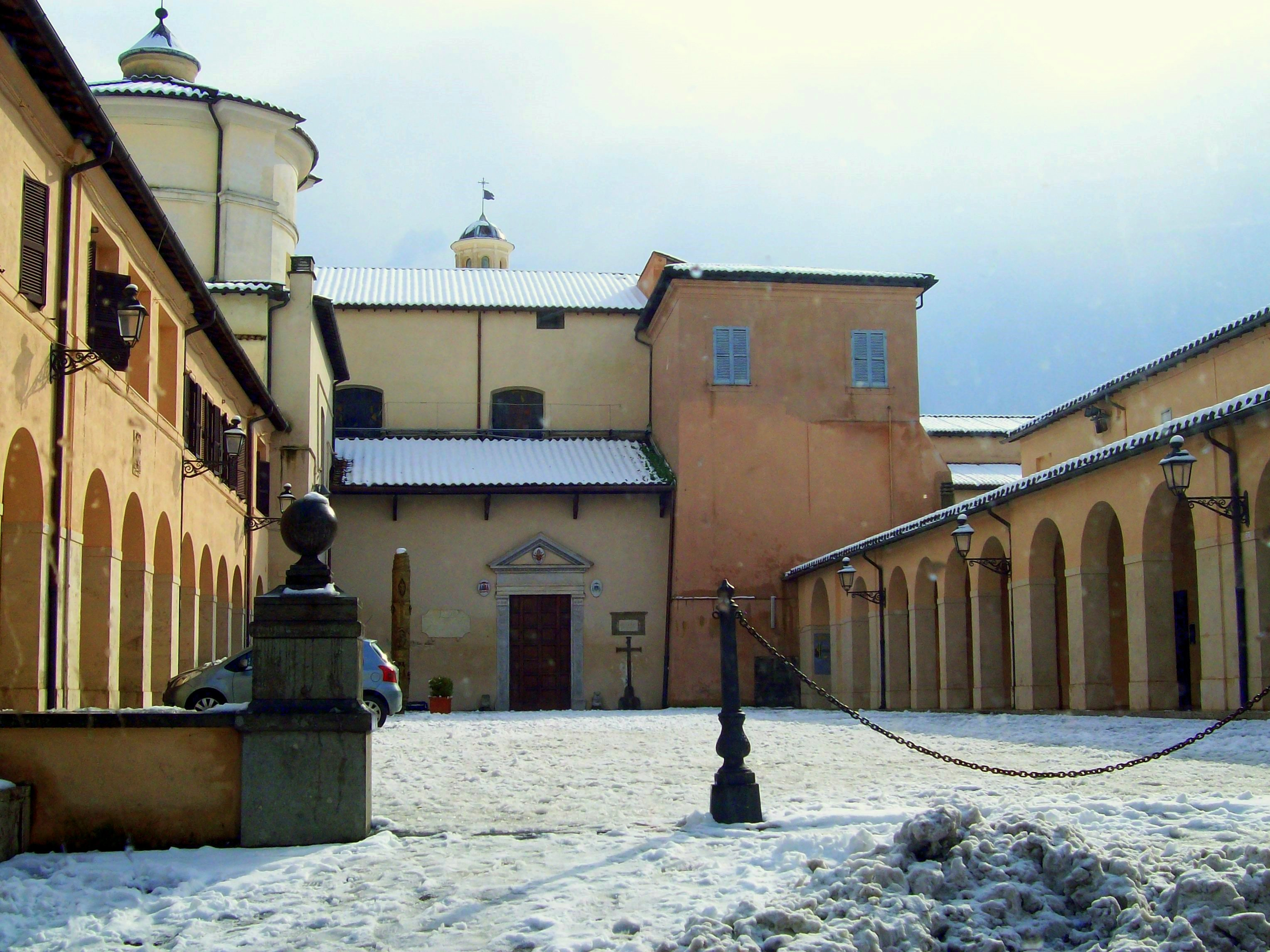
Velletri Cathedral

Velletri Cathedral (Italian: Duomo di Velletri; Cattedrale di San Clemente) is a Roman Catholic cathedral in Velletri in the region of Lazio, Italy, dedicated to Saint Clement, pope and martyr. It is the episcopal seat of the Suburbicarian Diocese of Velletri-Segni.

== History ==
A previous church on the site dated from the 4th century, but was rebuilt in 1660. The present crypt derives from the earlier church. The cathedral contains an altarpiece depicting the Coronation of the Virgin by Giovanni Balducci.
