= Francesco Maria Federico Carafa =

Italian Roman Catholic prelate

Most Reverend Francesco Maria Federico Carafa
- Bishop of Nola
- Church: Catholic Church
- Diocese: Diocese of Nola
- In office: 1704–1737
- Predecessor: Daniele Scoppa
- Successor: Troiano Caracciolo del Sole
- Previous post: Bishop of San Marco (1694–1704)

Orders
- Ordination: 22 July 1679
- Consecration: Pier Matteo Petrucci by 31 January 1694

Personal details
- Born: 3 August 1656 Rio Nero, Italy
- Died: 6 January 1737 (age 80) Nola, Italy

Francesco Maria Federico Carafa, C.R. (1656–1737) was a Roman Catholic prelate who served as Bishop of Nola (1704–1737) and Bishop of San Marco (1694–1704).

== Biography ==
Francesco Maria Federico Carafa was born in Rio Nero, Italy on 3 August 1656 and ordained a priest in the Congregation of Clerics Regular of the Divine Providence on 22 Jul 1679. On 25 January 1694, he was appointed during the papacy of Pope Innocent XI as Bishop of San Marco. On 31 January 1694, he was consecrated bishop by Pier Matteo Petrucci, Cardinal-Priest of San Marcello, with Giovanni Battista Visconti Aicardi, Bishop of Novara, and Gennaro Crespino, Bishop of Minori, serving as co-consecrators. On 7 April 1704, he was appointed during the papacy of Pope Clement XI as Bishop of Nola. He served as Bishop of Nola until his death on 6 January 1737.

While bishop, he was the principal co-consecrator of Erasmus Bertone, Titular Bishop of Eumenia (1730).

== External links and additional sources ==
- Cheney, David M. "Diocese of San Marco Argentano-Scalea". Catholic-Hierarchy.org. (for Chronology of Bishops) ^{[self-published]}
- Chow, Gabriel. "Diocese of San Marco Argentano-Scalea (Italy)". GCatholic.org. (for Chronology of Bishops) ^{[self-published]}
- Cheney, David M. "Diocese of Nola". Catholic-Hierarchy.org. (for Chronology of Bishops) ^{[self-published]}
- Chow, Gabriel. "Diocese of Nola (Italy)". GCatholic.org. (for Chronology of Bishops) ^{[self-published]}

Catholic Church titles
Preceded by Pietro Antonio d'Alessandro	Bishop of San Marco; 1694–1704	Succeeded by Matteo Gennaro Sibilia
Preceded by Daniele Scoppa	Bishop of Nola; 1704–1737	Succeeded by Troiano Caracciolo del Sole
