= Francesco Maria Moles =

Italian Roman Catholic prelate

Most Reverend Francesco Maria Moles
- Bishop Emeritus of Nola
- Church: Catholic Church
- Diocese: Diocese of Nola
- In office: 1684–1695
- Predecessor: Filippo Cesarini
- Successor: Daniele Scoppa

Orders
- Ordination: 1653
- Consecration: 16 January 1684 by Alessandro Crescenzi (cardinal)

Personal details
- Born: 1638 Naples, Italy
- Died: 12 May 1697 (age 59) Nola, Italy

Francesco Maria Moles, C.R. (1638 – 12 May 1697) was a Roman Catholic prelate who served as Bishop of Nola (1684–1695).

== Biography ==
Francesco Maria Moles was born in Naples, Italy in 1638 and ordained a priest in the Congregation of Clerics Regular of the Divine Providence in 1653. On 10 January 1684, he was appointed during the papacy of Pope Innocent XI as Bishop of Nola. On 16 January 1684, he was consecrated bishop by Alessandro Crescenzi (cardinal), Cardinal-Priest of Santa Prisca, with Giuseppe Bologna, Archbishop Emeritus of Benevento, and Victor Augustinus Ripa, Bishop of Vercelli, serving as co-consecrators. He served as Bishop of Nola until his resignation in 1695. He died on 12 May 1697.

While bishop, he was the principal co-consecrator of Placido Scoppa, Archbishop of Dubrovnik (1693).

== External links and additional sources ==
- Cheney, David M. "Diocese of Nola". Catholic-Hierarchy.org. (for Chronology of Bishops) ^{[self-published]}
- Chow, Gabriel. "Diocese of Nola (Italy)". GCatholic.org. (for Chronology of Bishops) ^{[self-published]}

Catholic Church titles
Preceded by Filippo Cesarini	Bishop of Nola; 1684–1695	Succeeded by Daniele Scoppa
