= Gille Ísa Ua Maílín =

Irish bishop in the 12th century

Gille Ísa Ua Maílín (died 1184) was an Irish bishop in the 12th century: he took the oath of fealty to Henry II in 1172 as Bishop of Mayo.
