= Martino Gomiero =

Italian Catholic bishop

- Bishop of Adria-Rovigo
- Church: Catholic Church
- Diocese: Diocese of Adria-Rovigo
- In office: 7 May 1988 – 11 October 2000
- Predecessor: Giovanni Sartori
- Successor: Andrea Bruno Mazzocato
- Previous posts: Bishop of Velletri–Segni (1986-1988); Bishop of Velletri e Segni (1982-1986)

Orders
- Ordination: 4 July 1948 by Carlo Agostini
- Consecration: 11 July 1982 by Sebastiano Baggio

Personal details
- Born: 7 December 1924 Teolo, Province of Padua, Kingdom of Italy
- Died: 20 November 2009 (aged 84) Rubano, Province of Padua, Italy

Martino Gomiero (7 December 1924 – 20 November 2009) was the Catholic bishop of the Diocese of Adria-Rovigo, Italy.

== Career ==
Ordained on 4 July 1948, Pope John Paul II appointed Gomiero diocesan bishop of Velletri-Segni on 5 June 1982 and he was ordained on 11 July 1982. On 7 May 1988, Bishop Gomiero was appointed bishop of the Adria-Rovigo Diocese retiring on 11 October 2000.
