= Andrea Maria Erba =

Italian Roman Catholic bishop

- Bishop of Velletri-Segni
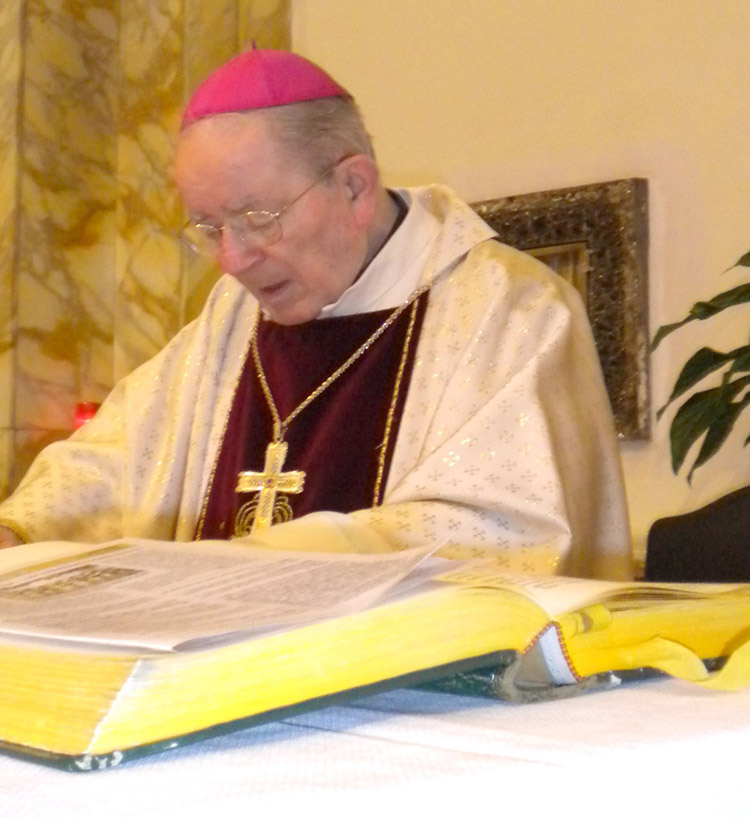
- Bishop Erba in 2009
- Church: Roman Catholic Church
- See: Diocese of Velletri-Segni
- In office: 1989 – 2006
- Predecessor: Martino Gomiero
- Successor: Vincenzo Apicella

Orders
- Ordination: March 17, 1956
- Consecration: January 6, 1989 by Pope John Paul II

Personal details
- Born: 1 January 1930 Biassono, Italy
- Died: 21 May 2016 (aged 86) Velletri, Italy
- Coat of arms

Andrea Maria Erba (1 January 1930 – 21 May 2016) was a Roman Catholic bishop.

Born in 1930, he was ordained to the priesthood for Barnabite Order in 1956, Erba served as bishop of the Roman Catholic Diocese of Velletri-Segni, Italy, from 1989 until 2008.
