= Pietro Antonio d'Alessandro =

Italian Roman Catholic prelate

Most Reverend Pietro Antonio d'Alessandro
- Bishop of San Marco
- Church: Catholic Church
- Diocese: Diocese of San Marco
- In office: 1688–1693
- Predecessor: Antonio Papa
- Successor: Francesco Maria Federico Carafa

Orders
- Ordination: 8 March 1653
- Consecration: 8 June 1688 by Galeazzo Marescotti

Personal details
- Born: 4 June 1628 Zalatone, Italy
- Died: 28 September 1693 (age 65) San Marco, Italy

Pietro Antonio d'Alessandro (1628–1693) was a Roman Catholic prelate who served as Bishop of San Marco (1688–1693).

== Biography ==
Pietro Antonio d'Alessandro was born in Zalatone, Italy on 4 June 1628 and ordained a priest on 8 March 1653. On 31 May 1688, he was appointed during the papacy of Pope Innocent XI as Bishop of San Marco. On 8 June 1688, he was consecrated bishop by Galeazzo Marescotti, Cardinal-Priest of Santi Quirico e Giulitta, with Pietro de Torres, Archbishop of Dubrovnik, and Pier Antonio Capobianco, Bishop Emeritus of Lacedonia, serving as co-consecrators. He served as Bishop of San Marco until his death on 28 September 1693.

== External links and additional sources ==
- Cheney, David M. "Diocese of San Marco Argentano-Scalea". Catholic-Hierarchy.org. (for Chronology of Bishops) ^{[self-published]}
- Chow, Gabriel. "Diocese of San Marco Argentano-Scalea (Italy)". GCatholic.org. (for Chronology of Bishops) ^{[self-published]}

Catholic Church titles
Preceded by Antonio Papa	Bishop of San Marco; 1688–1693	Succeeded by Francesco Maria Federico Carafa
