= Cesare Ferrante =

The Most Reverend Cesare Ferrante
- Bishop of Termoli
- Church: Catholic Church
- Diocese: Diocese of Termoli
- In office: 1569–1593
- Predecessor: Marcello Dentice
- Successor: Annibale Muzi

Orders
- Consecration: 16 April 1569 by Scipione Rebiba

Personal details
- Died: 1593 Termoli, Italy

Cesare Ferrante (died 1593) was a Roman Catholic prelate who served as Bishop of Termoli (1569–1593).

== Biography ==
On 1 April 1569, Cesare Ferrante was appointed during the papacy of Pope Pius V as Bishop of Termoli. On 16 April 1569, he was consecrated bishop by Scipione Rebiba, Cardinal-Priest of Sant'Angelo in Pescheria, with Giulio Antonio Santorio, Archbishop of Santa Severina, and Thomas Goldwell, Bishop of Saint Asaph, serving as co-consecrators. He served as Bishop of Termoli until his death in 1593.

While bishop, he was the principal co-consecrator of Prospero Vitelliano, Bishop of Bisignano (1569).

== External links and additional sources ==
- Cheney, David M. "Diocese of Termoli-Larino". Catholic-Hierarchy.org. (Chronology of Bishops) ^{[self-published]}
- Chow, Gabriel. "Diocese of Termoli-Larino (Italy)". GCatholic.org. (Chronology of Bishops) ^{[self-published]}

Catholic Church titles
Preceded by Marcello Dentice	Bishop of Termoli; 1569–1593	Succeeded by Annibale Muzi
