= John Bell (bishop of Mayo) =

Catholic bishop

John Bell, O.S.A. ( d1541) was a bishop in the late fifteenth and the first decades of the sixteenth century.

He was appointed Bishop of Mayo in 1493, but also worked as a suffragan bishop for the Archbishop of Canterbury.
