= Nicola Stridoni =

Most Reverend Nicola Stridoni
- Bishop of Mylopotamos
- Church: Catholic Church
- Diocese: Diocese of Milopotamus
- In office: 1582–?
- Predecessor: Giacomo Surreto
- Successor: Ottaviano Semitecolo

Orders
- Consecration: 17 June 1582 by Giulio Antonio Santorio

Nicola Stridoni was a Roman Catholic prelate who served as Bishop of Mylopotamos (1582–?).

== Biography ==
Nicola Stridoni was ordained a priest in the Canons Regular of the Order of the Holy Cross. On 16 May 1582, he was appointed during the papacy of Pope Gregory XIII as Bishop of Mylopotamos. On 17 June 1582, he was consecrated bishop by Giulio Antonio Santorio, Cardinal-Priest of San Bartolomeo all'Isola, with Giovanni Battista Santorio, Bishop of Alife, and Agostino Quinzio, Bishop of Korčula, serving as co-consecrators. It is uncertain how long he served as Bishop of Mylopotamos; the next bishop of record is Ottaviano Semitecolo who was appointed in 1592.

== External links and additional sources ==
- Cheney, David M. "Diocese of Mylopotamos". Catholic-Hierarchy.org. (for Chronology of Bishops) ^{[self-published]}
- Chow, Gabriel. "Titular Episcopal See of Eleutherna". GCatholic.org. (for Chronology of Bishops) ^{[self-published]}

Catholic Church titles
Preceded by Giacomo Surreto	Bishop of Mylopotamos; 1582–?	Succeeded by Ottaviano Semitecolo
