= Dante Bernini =

Italian Roman Catholic prelate (1922–2019)

- Bishop of the Diocese of Albano (emeritus)
- Church: Roman Catholic Church
- See: Roman Catholic Suburbicarian Diocese of Albano
- In office: 1982–1999
- Predecessor: Gaetano Bonicelli
- Successor: Agostino Vallini
- Previous post(s): Prelate

Orders
- Ordination: 12 August 1945

Personal details
- Born: 20 April 1922; La Quercia, Italy
- Died: 27 September 2019 (aged 97)

Dante Bernini (20 April 1922 – 27 September 2019) was an Italian prelate of the Catholic Church.

Bernini was born in La Quercia, Italy and ordained a priest on 12 August 1945. Bernini was appointed auxiliary bishop of the Diocese of Albano as well as titular bishop of Assidona on 30 October 1971 and ordained on 8 December 1971. Bernini was appointed bishop of the Diocese of Velletri on 10 July 1975, along with bishop of the diocese of Diocese of Segni. On 30 October 1981 Bernini was appointed bishop of the newly created Diocese of Velletri-Segni. Bernini was appointed bishop of the Diocese of Albano on 6 April 1982 and retired from the diocese on 13 November 1999.
