= Filippo Cesarini =

Most Reverend Filippo Cesarini
- Bishop of Nola
- Church: Catholic Church
- Diocese: Diocese of Nola
- In office: 1674–1683
- Predecessor: Francesco Gonzaga (bishop of Nola)
- Successor: Francesco Maria Moles
- Previous post: Bishop of Montepeloso (1655–1674)

Orders
- Consecration: 11 July 1655 by Francesco Maria Brancaccio

Personal details
- Born: 1610
- Died: 6 July 1683 (age 73) Nola, Italy

Filippo Cesarini (1610 – 6 July 1683) was a Roman Catholic prelate who served as Bishop of Nola (1674–1683) and Bishop of Montepeloso (1655–1674).

== Biography ==
Filippo Cesarini was born in 1610. On 5 July 1655, he was appointed during the papacy of Pope Alexander VII as Bishop of Montepeloso. On 11 July 1655, he was consecrated bishop by Francesco Maria Brancaccio, Bishop of Viterbo e Tuscania. On 12 March 1674, he was transferred by Pope Clement X to the diocese of Nola. He served as Bishop of Nola until his death on 6 July 1683.

== External links and additional sources ==
- Cheney, David M. "Diocese of Montepeloso". Catholic-Hierarchy.org. (Chronology of Bishops) ^{[self-published]}
- Chow, Gabriel. "Diocese of Irsina (Italy)". GCatholic.org. (Chronology of Bishops) ^{[self-published]}
- Cheney, David M. "Diocese of Nola". Catholic-Hierarchy.org. (for Chronology of Bishops) ^{[self-published]}
- Chow, Gabriel. "Diocese of Nola (Italy)". GCatholic.org. (for Chronology of Bishops) ^{[self-published]}

Catholic Church titles
Preceded by Attilio Orsini	Bishop of Montepeloso; 1655–1674	Succeeded by Raffaele Riario Di Saono
Preceded by Francesco Gonzaga (bishop of Nola)	Bishop of Nola; 1674–1683	Succeeded by Francesco Maria Moles
