= Eugene MacBrehon =

Irish clergyman and bishop

Eugene MacBrehon was an Irish clergyman and bishop for the Roman Catholic Diocese of Mayo. He was appointed bishop in 1541. He died in 1573.
