= Prospero Vitelliano =

The Most Reverend Prospero Vitelliano
- Bishop of Bisignano
- Church: Catholic Church
- In office: 1569–1575
- Predecessor: Filippo Spinola
- Successor: Giovanni Andrea Signati

Orders
- Consecration: 3 May 1569 by Giulio Antonio Santorio

Prospero Vitelliano was a Roman Catholic prelate who served as Bishop of Bisignano (1569–1575).

== Biography ==
On 22 April 1569, Prospero Vitelliano was appointed during the papacy of Pope Pius V as Bishop of Bisignano. On 3 May 1569, he was consecrated bishop by Giulio Antonio Santorio, Archbishop of Santa Severina, with Umberto Locati, Bishop of Bagnoregio, and Cesare Ferrante, Bishop of Termoli, serving as co-consecrators. He served as Bishop of Bisignano until his resignation in 1575.

== External links and additional sources ==
- Cheney, David M. "Diocese of Bisignano". Catholic-Hierarchy.org. (for Chronology of Bishops) ^{[self-published]}
- Chow, Gabriel. "Diocese of Bisignano (Italy)". GCatholic.org. (for Chronology of Bishops) ^{[self-published]}

Catholic Church titles
| Preceded by Filippo Spinola | Bishop of Bisignano; 1569–1575 | Succeeded by Giovanni Andrea Signati |
