= Diocese of Nola =

Roman Catholic diocese in Italy

Coordinates: 40.9333°N 14.5333°E

Diocese of Nola Dioecesis Nolana

Catholic
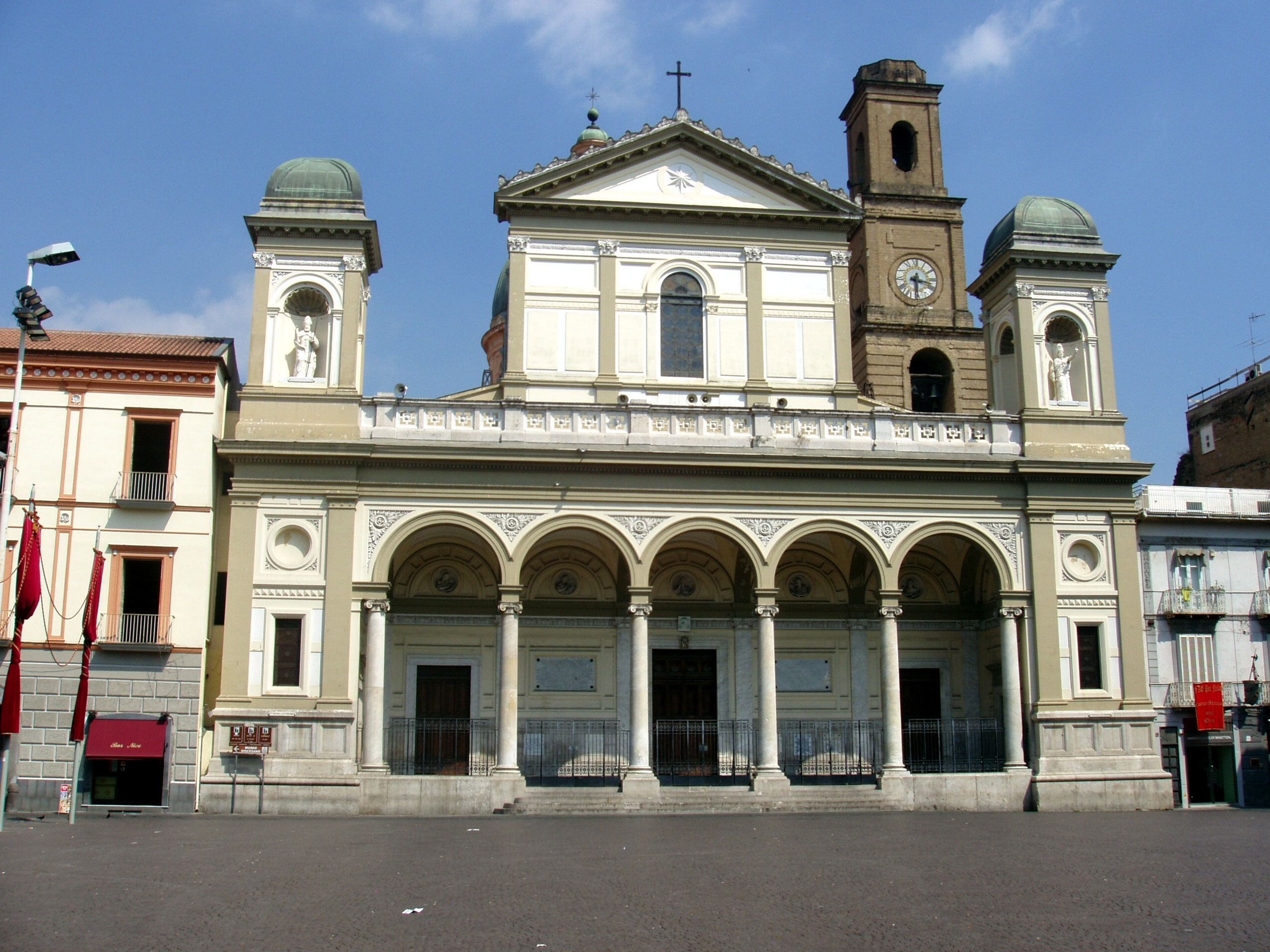
- Nola Cathedral

Location
- Country: Italy
- Ecclesiastical province: Naples

Statistics
- Area: 450 km^{2} (170 sq mi)
- Population: Total; Catholics: (as of 2016); 525,000 (est.); 500,000 (est.) (95.2%)
- Parishes: 115

Information
- Denomination: Catholic
- Sui iuris church: Latin Church
- Rite: Roman Rite
- Established: 3rd century
- Cathedral: Basilica Cattedrale di Maria SS. Assunta
- Secular priests: 145 (diocesan); 80 (Religious Orders); 21 Permanent Deacons

Current leadership
- Pope: Leo XIV
- Bishop: Francesco Marino
- Bishops emeritus: Beniamino Depalma

Website
- diocesinola.it

The Diocese of Nola (Latin: Dioecesis Nolana) is a Latin diocese of the Catholic Church in Italy, suffragan of the Archdiocese of Naples. Its seat is the Campanian city of Nola, now a suburb of Naples. Its cathedral is dedicated to the Assumption (Italian: Basilica Cattedrale di Maria SS Assunta). The dedication was originally to Saint Stephen the Protomartyr, but after the second reconstruction the dedication was changed to the Assumption. It is traditionally credited with the introduction of the use of bells into Christian worship.

== History ==
=== Antiquity ===
The diocese was founded in the 3rd century by Felix of Nola. He was martyred, as were St Januarius's companions Reparatus, Faustillus, and Acacius.

The early center of worship was at Cimitile, outside Nola proper and now named for its cemetery. The basilica of St Felix Martyr was built by Bishop Paulinus of Nola in the late 4th or early 5th century. Paulinus is traditionally credited with the introduction of bells into Christian ritual, whence two major medieval forms became known as nolas and campanas.

Felix's remains, and then Paulinus's own, made the site a focus of Christian pilgrimage. (Paulinus's body was removed to the neighboring Diocese of Benevento in 839, traded to the emperor Otto III in 1000, and finally restored to Nola in 1909.)

=== Middle Ages ===
Around 505, the mythical Bishop Serenus of Nola (Paulinus III) supposedly enslaved himself to free a widow's son. Several buildings were restored under Bishop Lupicinus of Nola around 786.

In 1370, Bishop Francesco Scaccani began construction of the present Gothic cathedral, which was completed by Gian Antonio Boccarelli in 1469.

The cathedral was administered and serviced by a Chapter, composed of four dignities (the Dean, the Archdeacon, the Treasurer, and the Cantor) and sixteen Canons. In addition, there was a Theologus and a Penitentiarius, in accordance with the decrees of the Council of Trent; they held prebends, but did not have a vote in the Chapter. There were also twelve beneficed clergy. In 1918, the Chapter had three dignities (Dean, Precentor, and Treasurer) and 7 Canons; there were eight Canons de numero.

=== Renaissance ===
The seminary was founded by Bishop Antonio Scarampi (1549–1569), introducing the reforms decreed by the Council of Trent. In 1585, Bishop Fabrizio Gallo (1585–1614) founded several charitable institutions. In 1588 Gallo held a diocesan synod.

=== Modern period ===
Giambattista Lancellotti, who served as bishop from 1615 to 1656, also served as papal nuncio to Poland from 1622 to 1627. Bishop Traiano Caracciolo constructed a new seminary building in 1738.

== Bishops ==
=== to 1200 ===
- Felix (c. 250)

...

- Marinus (c. 300)

...

- Priscus (d 523)

...
[Quodvultdeus]

- Paulinus (387? – 431)
- Paulinus Junior (attested 442)

...

- Deodatus (attested 473)
- Felix (attested 484)
- John Talaia (481 – 482)
- Theodosius (attested 490)
- Serenus (attested 494 – 501)

[Paulinus III] (c. 505)
...

- Priscus (attested 523)
- Musonius (attested 535)
- Leo (attested 536)

...

- Joannes (attested c. 555 – 560)
- Aurelianus
- Senatus

...

- Gaudentius (attested 594, 595)

...

- Aurelius (attested 680)

...

- Lupicinus (Lupinus) (c. 786)

...

- Lando
- Jacobus (Jacopo)
- Leo Tertius (attested 896, 911)
- Joannes
- Stephanus (attested 965, 973)
- Sixtus (attested 986)
- Sasso (attested 1093)
- Guilelmus (attested 1105, 1123)

...

- Paganus (attested 1136)

...

- Bartholomaeus (attested 1143)

...

- Robertus (1158 – 1173)
- Rufinus (1173 – 1175)
- Bernardus (1175 – c. 1190)

...

=== 1200 to 1600 ===
- Marinus (attested 1202)

...

- Petrus (c. 1215 – 1225)
- Marco Perrone (1225 – c. 1236)
- Petrus (December 1239 – c. 1256)
- Giovanni Montefuscolo (1259 – 1288)

Francesco Fontana (1289 – 1296) Administrator
Pietro Gerra (23 August 1296 – 6 January 1298) Apostolic Administrator

- Landone (22 April 1298 – 1304)
- Antonio Carafa (c. 1305 – ?)
- Giacomo (14 May 1311 – 1328)
- Pietro Sparano (1328 – 1331)
- Nicolò de Acerno (22 October 1331 – 1340)
- Lygus di Orvieto (1340 – 1349)
- Nicola d'Offerio (1349)
- Francesco Rufolo (1349 – 1370)
- Francesco Scaccani (1370 – 1400)
- Gianantonio Tarentino (Torrenti) (1400 – 1402) ?
- Flaminio Minutolo (26 July 1402 – 1442)
- Leone dei Simeoni (23 March 1442 – July 1469)
- Giovanni Antonio Boccarelli (9 August 1469 – 1475)
- Marco Vigerio (July 1475 – December 1475)
- Orlando Orsini (15 December 1475 – 1503)
- Gianfrancesco Bruno (4 July 1505 – 1549)
- Antonio Scarampi (1549 – 9 March 1569)
- Filippo Spinola (1569 – 1585)
- Fabrizio Gallo (15 July 1585 – 6 November 1614)

=== 1600 to present ===
- Giambattista Lancellotti (1615 – 1656)
- Francesco Gonzaga (1657 – 1673)
- Filippo Cesarini (1674 – 1683)
- Francesco Maria Moles (1684 – 1695)
- Daniele Scoppa (16 May 1695 – 13 May 1703)
- Francesco Maria Federico Carafa (7 April 1704 – 6 January 1737)
- Traiano Caracciolo (21 March 1738 – 16 February 1764)
- Nicola Sanchez de Luna (13 May 1764 – 23 April 1768)
- Filippo Lopez y Royo (16 May 1768 – 17 June 1793)
- Giovanni Vincenzo Monforte (1798 – 1802)
- Vincenzo Torrusio (29 October 1804 – 24 March 1823)
- Nicola Coppola (17 November 1823 – 14 April 1828)
- Gennaro Pasca (23 June 1828 – 2 October 1855)
- Giuseppe Formisano (28 September 1855 – 7 January 1890)
- Agnello Renzullo (22 June 1890 – 11 April 1924)
- Egisto Domenico Melchiori (2 May 1924 – 5 December 1934)
- Michele Raffaele Camerlengo (5 May 1935 – 9 September 1951)
- Adolfo Binni (14 February 1952 – 7 January 1971)
- Guerino Grimaldi (19 March 1971 – 2 July 1982)
- Giuseppe Costanzo (6 August 1982 – 7 December 1982)
- Umberto Tramma (23 June 1990 – 25 March 1999)
- Beniamino Depalma (15 July 1999 – 11 November 2016)
- Francesco Marino (11 November 2016 – present)

== Bibliography ==
=== Reference works ===
- Gams, Pius Bonifatius (1873). Series episcoporum Ecclesiae catholicae: quotquot innotuerunt a beato Petro apostolo. Ratisbon: Typis et Sumptibus Georgii Josephi Manz. p. 907-908. (Use with caution; obsolete)
- Eubel, Conradus, ed. (1913). Hierarchia catholica (in Latin). Vol. Tomus 1 (second ed.). Münster: Libreria Regensbergiana.
- Eubel, Conradus, ed. (1914). Hierarchia catholica (in Latin). Vol. Tomus 2 (second ed.). Münster: Libreria Regensbergiana.
- Eubel, Conradus; Gulik, Guilelmus (1923). Hierarchia catholica (in Latin). Vol. Tomus 3 (second ed.). Münster: Libreria Regensbergiana.
- Gauchat, Patritius (Patrice) (1935). Hierarchia catholica. Vol. Tomus IV (1592–1667). Münster: Libraria Regensbergiana.
- Ritzler, Remigius; Sefrin, Pirminus (1952). Hierarchia catholica medii et recentis aevi. Vol. Tomus V (1667–1730). Patavii: Messagero di S. Antonio.
- Ritzler, Remigius; Sefrin, Pirminus (1958). Hierarchia catholica medii et recentis aevi. Vol. Tomus VI (1730–1799). Patavii: Messagero di S. Antonio.
- Ritzler, Remigius; Sefrin, Pirminus (1968). Hierarchia Catholica medii et recentioris aevi (in Latin). Vol. VII (1800–1846). Monasterii: Libreria Regensburgiana.
- Remigius Ritzler; Pirminus Sefrin (1978). Hierarchia catholica Medii et recentioris aevi (in Latin). Vol. VIII (1846–1903). Il Messaggero di S. Antonio.
- Pięta, Zenon (2002). Hierarchia catholica medii et recentioris aevi (in Latin). Vol. IX (1903–1922). Padua: Messagero di San Antonio. ISBN 978-88-250-1000-8.

=== Studies ===
- Cappelletti, Giuseppe (1864). Le chiese d'Italia: dalla loro origine sino ai nostri giorni : opera (in Italian). Vol. decimonono (19). Venice: G. Antonelli. pp. 561–633.
- Ebanista, C.; Fusaro, F. (2005), Cimitile. Guida al complesso basilicale e alla città, Nuova edizione ampliata e aggiornata, Cimitile: Commune de Cimitile–Progetto grafico di R. C. La Fata, 2005.
- Kehr, Paul Fridolin (1925), Italia pontificia Vol. VIII (Berlin: Weidmann 1925), pp. 297-302. (in Latin)
- Lanzoni, Francesco (1927), Le diocesi d'Italia dalle origini al principio del secolo VII (an. 604), Faenza: F. Lega, pp. 228-239. (in Italian)
- D'Avino, Vincenzo (1848). Cenni storici sulle chiese arcivescovili, vescovili, e prelatizie (nullius) del Regno delle Due Sicilie (in Italian). dalle stampe di Ranucci. pp. 489-490.
- Remondini, Gianstefano (1757). Della Nolana Ecclesiastica Storia (in Italian). Vol. Tomo III. Napoli: Stamperia Simoniana.
- Santaniello, Giovanni (2005), https://web.archive.org/web/20160304075132/http://www.diocesinola.it/web/files/Teologia_Vita_7.pdf "I successori del vescovo Paolino di Nola (secoli V e VI)"], in: Teologia e Vita, Quaderni dell'Istituto Superiore di Scienze Religiose "Giovanni Duns Scoto - Nola", nº 7, giugno 2005, pp. 18-51. (in Italian)
- Ughelli, Ferdinando; Coleti, Niccolo (1720). Italia sacra sive De episcopis Italiæ, et insularum adjacentium (in Latin). Vol. Tomus sextus (6). Venice: apud Sebastianum Coleti. pp. 242–266.

==== Acknowledgments ====
- "Nola", Catholic Encyclopedia, New York: Encyclopedia Press, 1907.
