= Guglielmo Sirleto =

Catholic cardinal (1514–1585)

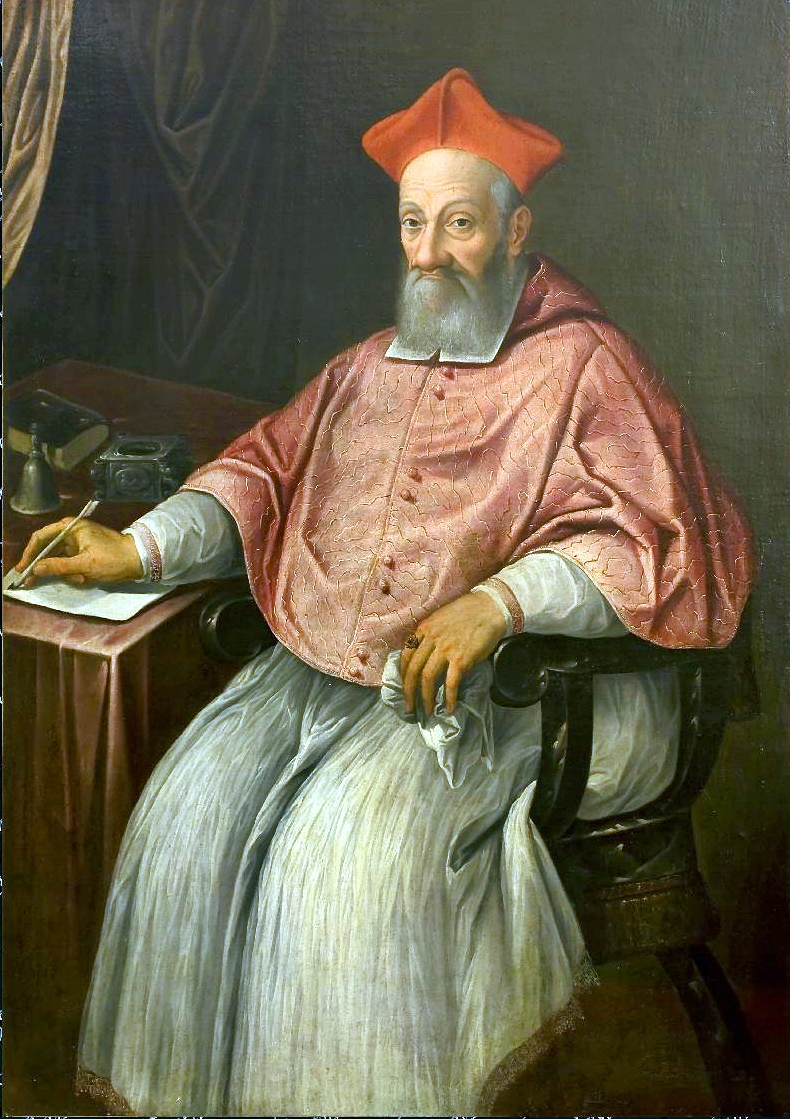
- Born: 1514; Guardavalle
- Died: 8 October 1585 (aged 70–71); Rome
- Occupation: Librarian, Catholic priest, Bishops in the Catholic Church (1566–)
- Employer: Vatican Library
- Position held: cardinal (1565–1585), Prefect of the Vatican Library (1570–1585), Roman Catholic Bishop of San Marco (Argentano) (1566–1568), Roman Catholic Bishop of Squillace (1568–1573)

Guglielmo Sirleto (or Sirleti) (1514 – 6 October 1585) was an Italian Cardinal and scholar. He was considered the greatest linguist of his age.

Sirleto was born at Guardavalle near Stilo in Calabria. The son of a physician, he received an excellent education, made the acquaintance of distinguished scholars in Rome, and became a close friend of Cardinal Marcello Cervino, later Pope Marcellus II. He prepared for Cervino, who was President of the Council of Trent in its initial period, extensive reports on all the important questions presented for discussion. After his appointment as custodian of the Vatican Library, Sirleto drew up a complete descriptive catalogue of its Greek manuscripts and prepared a new edition of the Vulgate.

Pope Paul IV named him prothonotary and tutor to two of his nephews. After this pope's death he taught Greek and Hebrew at Rome, numbering Charles Borromeo among his students. There was talk of making him Pope, but it was considered that the drift of his mind was too much given to letters to permit him to run a strong, practical administration in those troubled times.

During the concluding period of the Council of Trent, he was, although he continued to reside at Rome, the adviser of the cardinal-legates.

He was himself created cardinal in 1565 at the request of Charles Borromeo, became Bishop of San Marco in Calabria in 1566, and Bishop of Squillace in 1568. An order of the papal secretary of state, however, enjoined his residence at Rome, where he was named, in 1570, librarian of the Vatican Library. This he enriched with many valuable texts on Greek, Latin and Oriental subjects. His influence was paramount in the execution of the scientific undertakings decreed by the Council of Trent.

He collaborated in the publication of the Roman Catechism, presided over the Commissions for the reform of Roman Breviary and Roman Missal, and directed the work of the new edition of the Roman Martyrology. Highly appreciative of Greek culture, he entertained all friendly relations with the East and encouraged all efforts tending to ecclesiastical reunion.

Though of relatively modest means, Sirleto was a collector of manuscripts (e.g. Minuscule 373).

His learning was such that he was reported to discourse in his sleep in Greek and Latin. Latino Latini declared in a letter to Andreas Masius that he considered that Sirleto was equal in learning to all the others who worked on the Vulgate.

In the city of Rome he was the Protector of the Confraternity of Catechumens and Neophytes, a particular organization which gave assistance to converts from non-Christian religions.

He was attended in his last illness by Philip Neri. He died in Rome, and his burial took place in the presence of Pope Sixtus V.
