= Patrick O'Hely =

Irish Roman Catholic bishop (c. 1545–1579)

Blessed Patrick O'Hely (Irish: Pádraig Ó hÉilí) O.F.M.
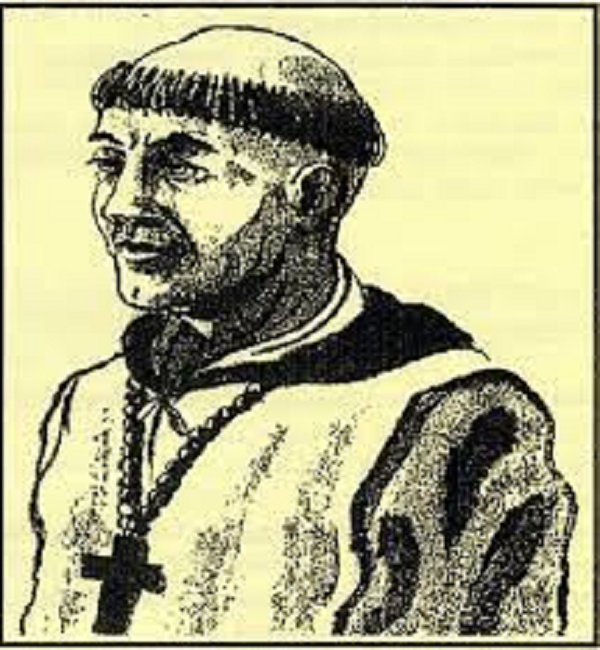

Bishop of Mayo, Martyr
- Born: between c. 1543 and c. 1546; Dromahair, County Leitrim, Ireland
- Died: 31 August 1579 (aged between 33 and 36); Outside one of the gates of Kilmallock
- Venerated in: Roman Catholic Church
- Beatified: 27 September 1992 by Pope John Paul II
- Feast: 31 August

Patrick O'Hely (Irish: Pádraig Ó hÉilí) (born between 1543 and 1546, died 31 August 1579) was an Irish Franciscan priest from Creevelea Abbey, near Dromahair, County Leitrim, and illegal and underground Bishop of Mayo, who was tortured and executed as part of the Elizabethan era religious persecution of the Catholic Church in Ireland. Bishop O'Hely was Beatified, along with his fellow Franciscan Friar and companion in martyrdom, Conn Ó Ruairc, by Pope John Paul II along with 15 other Irish Catholic Martyrs on 27 September 1992. Their martyrdom is commemorated every year on 20 June.

== Biography ==
Although little or nothing is known of his early life, Patrick O'Hely is believed to have been born between 1543 and 1546. He later described himself in a letter dated 24 June 1575, and which survives in the Archivo General de Simancas as fray Patricio Oheli de Petra. Petra is believed by some historians to be a shorthand rendering of Petra Patricii, the usual Hiberno-Latin rendering of (Irish: Carraig Phádraig), the name in Connaught Irish for the hill upon which stood Creevelea Abbey (Irish: an Mainistir na Craoibhe Léithe), the Franciscan Friary at Dromahair, County Leitrim. If so, it would suggest that O'Hely was a native of the region, an alumnus of the Friary, or both.

English Franciscan Thomas Bourchier roomed from 1578 to 1579 with Patrick O'Hely in Paris and became his late friend's first biographer. According to Bouchier, O'Hely received a classical Christian education during his youth in Ireland and was sent, due to his great intellectual brilliance, four years after his profession to Rome. In 1562, O'Hely arrived in Rome and presented himself to Francisco Zamora de Cuenca Minister General of the Franciscan Order. Zamora was very impressed with O'Hely and arranged for him to continue his education in the Franciscan Province of Cartagena.

In Spain, O'Hely first studied grammar for two years in the Friary at Molina de Aragón, then studied philosophy for four years at the Friary at San Clemente, where he was formally incardinated into the Province of Cartagena. His superiors next sent him to Alcalá de Henares, where he continued his studies at the University of Alcalá, where he surpassed his contemporaries in sacred studies.

During his residence in Spain, O'Hely became a fluent speaker of the Catalan language.

While residing in the Aracoeli monastery in Rome, O'Hely was proposed to the Pope at the 4 July 1575 consistory meeting for the bishopric of Mayo, later merged in the archbishopric of Tuam. As the Catholic Church in Ireland was still strictly illegal and underground, Pope Gregory XIII empowered Bishop O'Hely to officiate in adjoining dioceses, if no Catholic bishop were at hand, and supplied him generously with money. At Paris he took part in public disputations at the Sorbonne university, amazing his hearers by his mastery of patristic, Renaissance humanist, and Counter-Reformation theology, as well as of Scotist philosophy.

In autumn, 1579, he sailed from Brittany and arrived off the coast of Kerry after James Fitzmaurice had landed at Ard na Caithne from Portugal with the remnant of Thomas Stukeley's expedition. All Munster was up in arms.

The House of Desmond was divided, and the Earl had withdrawn from the scene of action. The bishop and his companion, Conn O'Rourke (Irish: Conn Ó Ruairc, born c. 1549), a Franciscan Friar, son of Brian, Lord of Breifne, came ashore at Corca Dhuibhne and sought hospitality at Askeaton Castle, where, in the Earl's absence, the Countess entertained them. Next day, they departed for Limerick; but the Countess, probably so instructed, for the Rebel Earl later claimed the merit afterwards, gave information to the Lord Mayor of Limerick, who three days later seized the two ecclesiastics and sent them to Kilmallock, where Lord Justice Sir William Drury then was with an army.

As Lord President of Munster, Drury had taken severe measures, in one year executing four hundred persons "by justice and martial law"; some he sentenced "by natural law, for that he found no law to try them by in the realm".

At first, he offered to secure Bishop Ó hÉilí in his see for the Church of Ireland if he would take the Oath of Supremacy and disclose all business of the Holy See. The bishop replied that he could not barter his faith for life or honours. Bishop O'Hely also confessed that he belonged to the Franciscan Order and was the Bishop of Mayo. He explained that his reasons for returning to Ireland were purely religious and that his mission was always intended to be a peaceful one.

Drury responded, "And do you dare to defend the authority of the Pope against the laws of the Queen and Parliament?!"

O'Hely replied, "I repeat what I have said and I am ready if necessary to die for that sacred truth." Friar O'Rourke replied in the same strain.

Even though O'Hely had advised the Vatican to support the First Desmond Rebellion, to all questions from Drury about future plans by the Pope and King Philip II of Spain for invading Ireland he made no answer and, in response, he was delivered to torture.

According to Cardinal Patrick Francis Moran, "These orders from Drury were executed with an uncommon degree of barbarity. The two prisoners were first placed on the rack, their arms and feet were beaten with hammers, so that their thigh bones were broken and sharp iron points and needles were cruelly thrust under their nails, which caused an extreme agony of suffering."

According to Cardinal William Allen, the Elizabethan era English use of torture by the driving of needles and spikes under the finger- and toenails was, "one torment that people in Spain imagine to be that which will be worked by the Antichrist as the most dreadfully cruel of them all." The Cardinal further explained that whenever a Recusant or Catholic priest would not "confess" or take the Oath of Supremacy under other forms of torture, the iron spikes would be used, "so that the nails of their fingers and toes were turned back."

Cardinal Moran continues, however, "For a considerable time they were subjected to these tortures, which the holy confessors bore patiently for the love of Christ, mutually exhorting one another to constancy and perseverance."

Blessed Conn O'Rourke (Irish: Conn Ó Ruairc) O.F.M.

Franciscan friar, Martyr
- Born: c. 1549; Brefney, Ireland
- Died: 31 August 1579 (aged 29 – 30); Outside one of the gates of Kilmallock
- Venerated in: Roman Catholic Church
- Beatified: 27 September 1992 by Pope John Paul II
- Feast: 31 August

Also according to Cardinal Moran, "When the martyr-prelate was being hurried to execution, he turned to Drury, and warned him that before many days he himself should appear before the tribunal of God to answer for his crimes."

Bishop O'Hely and Friar Conn O'Ruairc were hanged from a tree just outside the gates of Kilmallock on 22/31 August 1579. Their bodies were left suspended from this improvised gallows for fourteen days, during which both bodies were used for target practice by the local military garrison of the Tudor Army. Patrick O'Hely was the first Bishop of the Catholic Church in Ireland to be executed following Henry VIII's break with Rome.

Cardinal Moran writes of Drury, however, "On the fourteenth day after, this unhappy man expired in great agony, at Waterford, of a distemper that baffled every remedy." Drury Lane in London is still named in his honour.

Despite his own role in their arrest, the Rebel Earl of Desmond arranged for both Franciscans' bodies to be buried in the monastery Church of their Order in Clonmel, County Tipperary. In 1647, the relics were re-exhumed and solemnly reburied alongside the bodies of the Earls of Desmond at Askeaton Abbey, County Limerick.

== Legacy ==
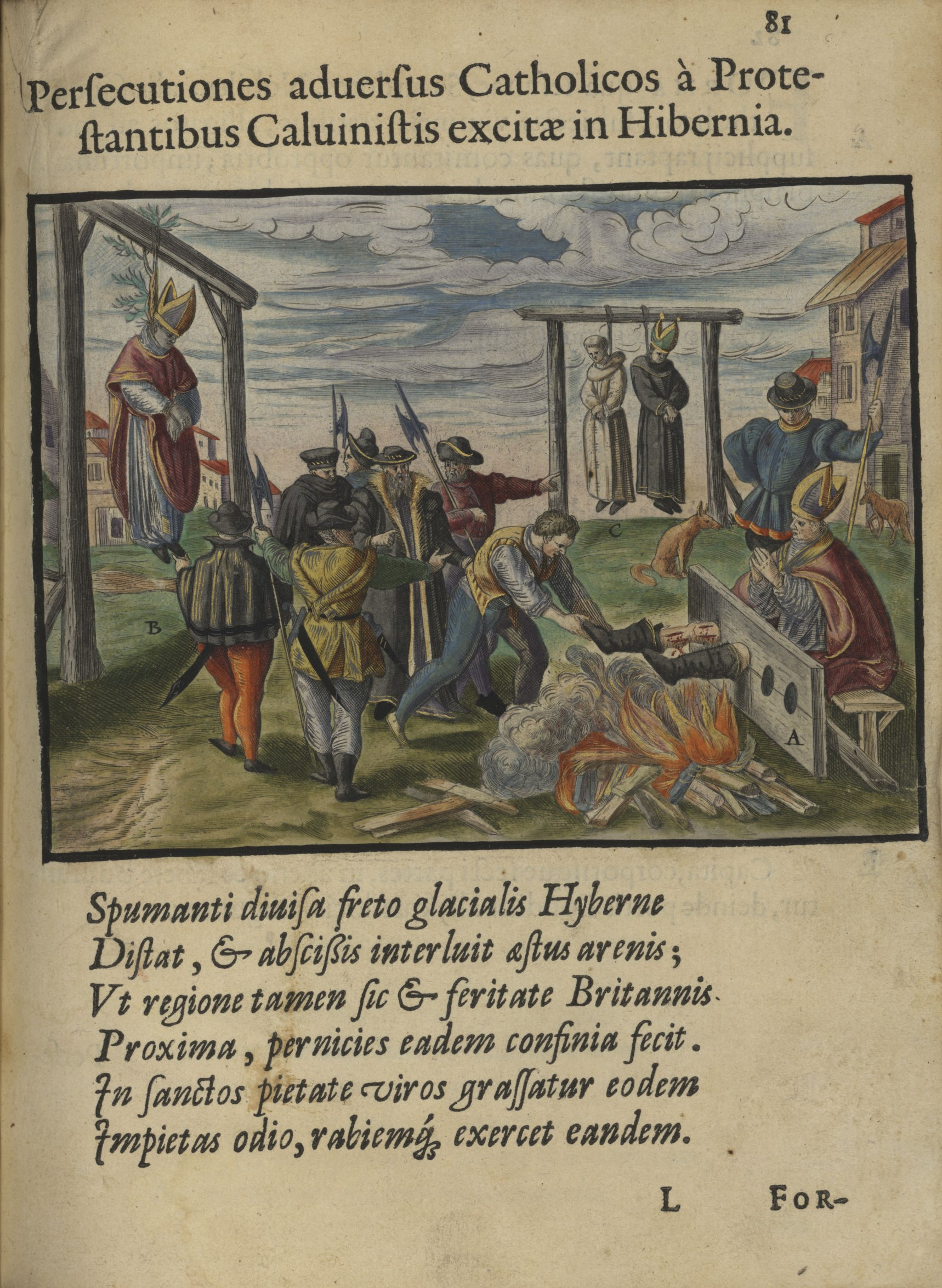
Exiled English Recusant poet Richard Verstegen's depiction of the religious persecution of Irish Catholics, focusing mainly upon the torture and execution of Archbishop Dermot O'Hurley. The hanging of Bishop Patrick O'Hely and Friar Conn Ó Ruairc is shown in the background.

The torture and martyrdom of Bishop O'Hely and Friar Conn remains highly significant as a contributing cause for the Nine Years War, which formally began when Red Hugh O'Donnell expelled English High Sheriff of Donegal Humphrey Willis. According to Philip O'Sullivan Beare, "Being surrounded there [Willis] surrendered to Roe by whom he was dismissed in safety with an injunction to remember his words, that the Queen and her officers were dealing unjustly with the Irish; that the Catholic religion was contaminated by impiety; that holy bishops and priests were inhumanely and barbarously tortured; that Catholic noblemen were cruelly imprisoned and ruined; that wrong was deemed right; that he himself had been treacherously and perfidiously kidnapped; and that for these reasons he would neither give tribute or allegiance to the English."

In September 1992, Pope John Paul II beatified O'Rourke and O'Hely alongside 15 other Irish Catholic Martyrs.
