= Francesco Gonzaga (bishop of Nola) =

Roman Catholic Bishop

Most Reverend Francesco Gonzaga
- Church: Catholic Church
- Diocese: Diocese of Nola
- In office: 1657–1673
- Predecessor: Giovanni Battista Lancellotti
- Successor: Filippo Cesarini

Orders
- Consecration: 24 February 1633 by Antonio Marcello Barberini

Personal details
- Born: 1602
- Died: 18 December 1673 (age 71) Nola, Italy

Francesco Gonzaga, C.R. (1602 – 18 December 1673) was a Roman Catholic prelate who served as Bishop of Nola (1657–1673) and Bishop of Cariati e Cerenzia (1633–1657).

== Biography ==
Francesco Gonzaga was born in 1602 and ordained a priest in the Congregation of Clerics Regular of the Divine Providence. On 21 February 1633, he was appointed during the papacy of Pope Urban VIII as Bishop of Cariati e Cerenzia. On 24 February 1633, he was consecrated bishop by Antonio Marcello Barberini, Cardinal-Priest of Sant'Onofrio. On 17 December 1657, he was appointed during the papacy of Pope Alexander VII as Bishop of Nola. He served as Bishop of Nola until his death on 18 December 1673.

== Episcopal succession ==
While bishop, he was the principal co-consecrator of:

- Fabrizio Savelli, Archbishop of Salerno (1642); and
- Pietro Jerónimo Martínez y Rubio, Archbishop of Palermo (1657).

== External links and additional sources ==
- Cheney, David M. "Diocese of Cariati". Catholic-Hierarchy.org. (for Chronology of Bishops) ^{[self-published]}
- Chow, Gabriel. "Diocese of Cariati (Italy)". GCatholic.org. (for Chronology of Bishops) ^{[self-published]}
- Cheney, David M. "Diocese of Nola". Catholic-Hierarchy.org. (for Chronology of Bishops) ^{[self-published]}
- Chow, Gabriel. "Diocese of Nola (Italy)". GCatholic.org. (for Chronology of Bishops) ^{[self-published]}

Catholic Church titles
Preceded by Lorenzo Fei	Bishop of Cariati e Cerenzia; 1633–1657	Succeeded by Agazio di Somma
Preceded by Giovanni Battista Lancellotti	Bishop of Nola; 1657–1673	Succeeded by Filippo Cesarini
