= Bertrand Lagier =

French Franciscan and cardinal

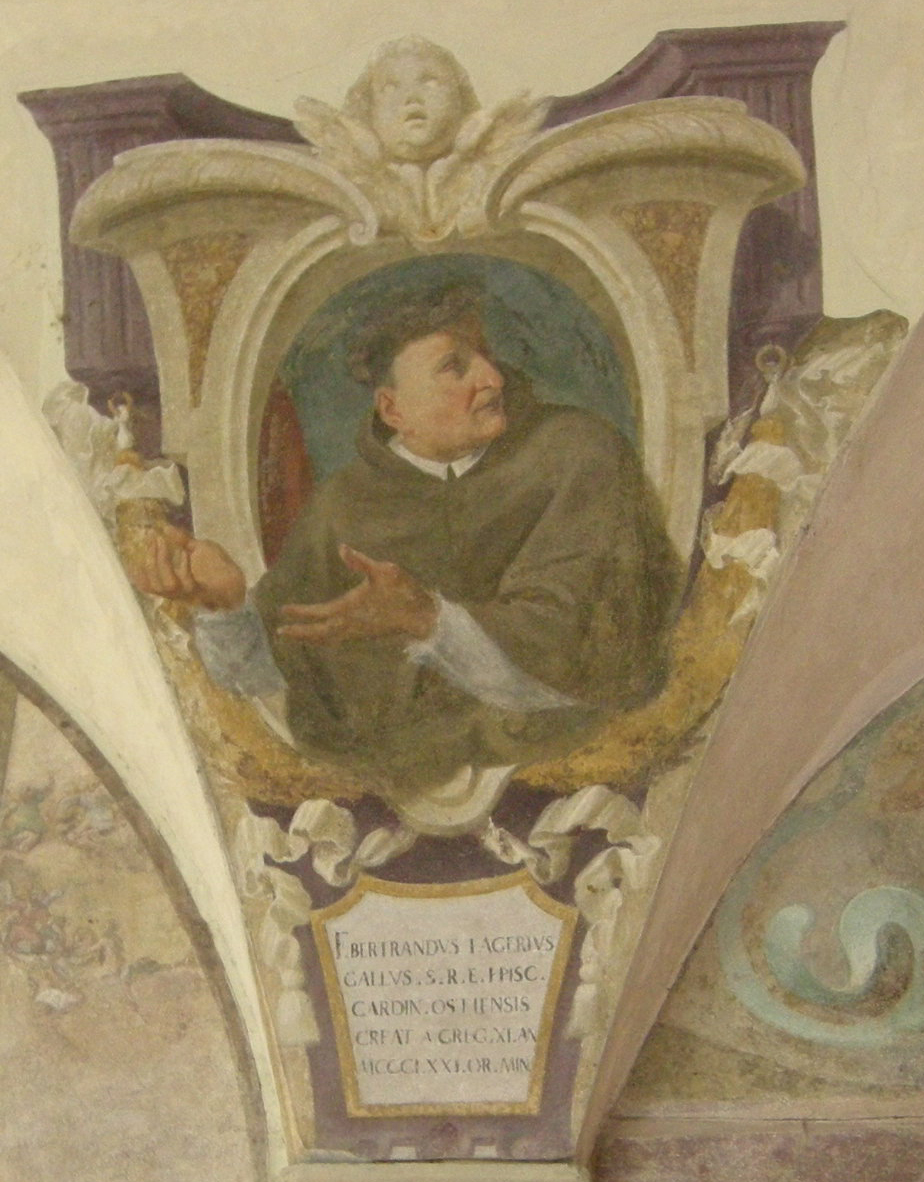
Bertrand Lagier

Bertrand Lagier O.Min. (died 8 November 1392) was a French Franciscan and cardinal of the Catholic Church. He was bishop of Assisi in 1357, and bishop of Glandèves in France, in 1368.

He was made cardinal on 30 May 1371 by Pope Gregory XI, and then bishop of Ostia in April 1378 by Pope Urban VI. After the outbreak of the Great Western Schism he joined the obedience of the Avignon Antipope Clement VII.
