= Roman Catholic Diocese of Milopotamus =

The Roman Catholic Diocese of Milopotamus (also Diocese of Mylopotamus) is a former Latin Catholic bishopric on Crete in southern Greece and present Latin titular bishopric, now under the later assumed name Eleutherna.

== Ecclesiastical history ==
Modern Lefterna, in Mylopotamos, Crete, was the seat since 1212 of a Latin Roman Catholic Diocese of Milopotamus, which was suppressed in 1669.

=== Resident bishops ===
- Matteo (? – death 1212)
- Giacomo (? – death 1281)
- Giovanni (1307.05.29 – ?)
- Michele da Verona, O.P. (1340? – 1342.10.07), later Bishop of Chioggia (Italy) (1342.10.07 – death 1346)
- Nicola, O.F.M. (1344.06.23 – 1349)
- Giacomo di Ponto, O.F.M. (1349.07.08 – ?)
- Arnaldo Albi, O.F.M. (1387.08.26 – ?)
- Vittore, O. Carm. (1390 – ?)
- Domenico de Dominicis, O. Carm. (1399 – ?)
- Franchione Secreti, O.F.M. (1414.04.02 – death 1437), previously Bishop of Ario (Greece) (1410.07.28 – 1414.04.02)
- Giorgio (1480.01.24 – death 1499.10.07)
- Francesco Barthelay (1499.11.06 – ?)
- Vincenzo Massari (1515.05.12 – death 1538)
- Dionisio Zannettini, O.F.M. (1538.12.11 – 1555), previously Bishop of Bishop of Ceo (Greek Island; 1529.02.08 – 1538.12.11)
- Giacomo Surreto, O.F.M. (1555.07.17 – ?)
- Nicola Stridoni, O.Cruc. (1582.05.16 – ?)
- Ottaviano Semitecolo, O.Cruc. (1592.11.20 – ?)
- Aloisio Bollani, O.Cruc. (1594.01.19 – ?)
- Dionisio Medori (1606.02.20 – death 1609.09.21)
- Giovanni Aloisio Farfusola (1628.04.03 – ?)
- Zerbino Lugo (1628.04.03 – 1639.01.09), later Bishop of Feltre (Italy) (1639.01.09 – death 1647.01)
- Gozzadino Gozzadini (1641.08.12 – ?)

=== Titular see of Eleutherna (originally Milopotamus) ===
When the diocese of Milopotamus was suppressed in 1669, it was immediately turned into a Latin Titular bishopric of the lowest (episcopal) rank, which had its name changed gradually in the 20th century into titular see of Eleutherna.

It is vacant, having had the following incumbents:

- Saint Bishop Ignacio Clemente Delgado Cebrián, Dominican Order (O.P.) (1794.02.11 – 1838.07.12)
- Nicholas Patrick Stephen Wiseman (1840.05.22 – 1850.09.29), Coadjutor Vicar Apostolic of the Central District (England) (1840.05.22 – 1847.09.02); later Pro-Vicar Apostolic of the London District (England) (1847.09.02 – 1848.07.28), promoted Coadjutor Vicar Apostolic of the London District (England) (1848.07.28 – 1849.02.18), succeeding as Vicar Apostolic of the London District (England) (1849.02.18 – 1850.09.29), then Apostolic Administrator of Southwark (England) (1850.09.29 – 1851.06.27) and Metropolitan Archbishop of Westminster (England) (1850.09.29 – 1865.02.15) and Cardinal-Priest of S. Pudenziana (1850.10.03 – 1865.02.15)
- Jacobus Gerardus Schepers, Redemptorists (C.SS.R.) (1852.09.07 – 1863.11.27)
- Gabriele Capaccio (1867.05.10 – 1878.01.01)
- Anthony Butler, Jesuit Order (S.J.) (1878.05.31 – 1901.10.02)
- James J. Davis (1904.10.07 – 1906.12.22)
- Peter Joseph Hurth, Holy Cross Fathers (C.S.C.) (1909.02.15 – 1913.01.07), later Archbishop
- Agustín José Bernaus y Serra, Capuchin Franciscans (O.F.M. Cap.) (1913.05.09 – 1930.01.18)
- Pietro Giovanni Umberto Verriet (O.P.) (1931.11.13 – 1948.03.10)
- Paul Tkotsch (1948.05.12 – 1963.05.14)
- Salomão Barbosa Ferraz (1963.05.10 – 1969.05.11)

== See also ==
- Catholic Church in Greece
