= Diocese of San Marco Argentano-Scalea =

Latin Catholic jurisdiction in Italy

Coordinates: 39.5500°N 16.1167°E

Diocese of San Marco Argentano-Scalea Dioecesis Sancti Marci Argentanensis-Scaleensis

Catholic
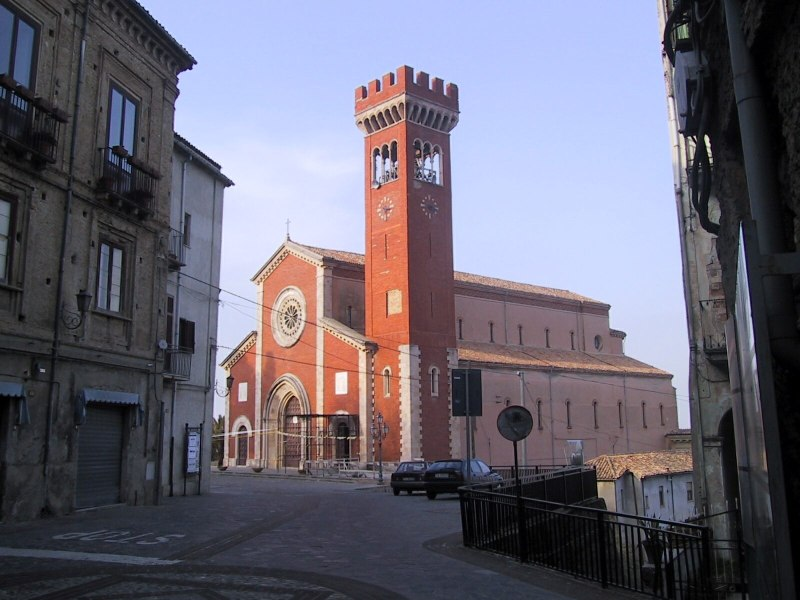
- Cathedral in San Marco Argentano

Location
- Country: Italy
- Ecclesiastical province: Cosenza-Bisignano

Statistics
- Area: 1,148 km^{2} (443 sq mi)
- Population: Total; Catholics: (as of 2023); 115,000 (est.) ▼; 112,580 (est.) ▼ (97.4%%)
- Parishes: 65

Information
- Denomination: Catholic Church
- Sui iuris church: Latin Church
- Rite: Roman Rite
- Established: before 1171
- Cathedral: Cathedral of St. Nicholas
- Patron saint: Mark the Evangelist
- Secular priests: 70 (diocesan) ▼0 (Religious Orders); 12 Permanent Deacons ▲

Current leadership
- Pope: Leo XIV
- Bishop: Stefano Rega
- Metropolitan Archbishop: Giovanni Checchinato
- Bishops emeritus: Leonardo Antonio Paolo Bonanno

Map

Website
- Diocesan web site (in Italian)

The Diocese of San Marco Argentano-Scalea (Latin: Dioecesis Sancti Marci Argentanensis-Scaleensis) is a Latin Church ecclesiastical territory or diocese of the Catholic Church in Italy. Its episcopal see is Cosenza, Calabria. The diocese existed as the Diocese of San Marco since at least 1171, when the name of Bishop Ruben appears in a document. It is now a suffragan in the ecclesiastical province of the metropolitan Archdiocese of Cosenza-Bisignano.

== History ==
The historical Diocese of San Marco was created in the twelfth century, out of the remains of the diocese of Malvito. From its beginning, the diocese of San Marco was directly dependent on the Roman See, and was not (unlike Malvito) part of any metropolitan province.

Bishop Ruben (Radulfus Melfensis) of San Marco was present at the III Lateran Council of 1179, signing last among the bishops directly dependent upon the Holy See.

In April 1275, Pope Gregory X, who had completed the II Council of Lyon and was still in Lyon organizing the next Crusade, was impelled to issue a mandate to the Archbishop of Capua to investigate the situation of the Church of San Marco, which was involved in a contested episcopal election. The Pope's stated causa (reason for acting) was that the diocese was attached to the Roman Church, ad Romanam ecclesiam nullo medio spectare dignoscitur. In other words, Pope Gregory was the immediate ecclesiastical superior, with no other authority intervening, not even a metropolitan archbishop.

The seminary of San Marco was established by Bishop Giovanni Antonio Grignetti (1578–1585), in accordance with the decrees of the Council of Trent. The new seminary buildings were built by Bishop Greco in the nineteenth century. Up until the mid-eighteenth century, the seminaries were simple schools of grammar, practical mathematics, ecclesiastical computations, Christian doctrine (as prescribed by Roberto Bellarmine), and Gregorian chant.

In 1818, in accordance with the terms of the Concordat between the Holy See and the Kingdom of the Two Sicilies, the diocese of San Marco was combined with the diocese of Bisignano, becoming the diocese of San Marco e Bisignano and was ranked as immediately subject to the Holy See. In 1834 the territory of Cetraro on the Tyrrhenian coast was added to the diocese of San Marco e Bisignano. Certraro had been founded as a monastery by Robert Guiscard and his wife Sigelgaita and given to the Monastery of Montecassino in 1086; its first abbot was Desiderius, who became Pope Victor III. Since Cetraro was too far distant from Montecassino for effective administration, the Benedictines of Montecassino had assigned the administration of Cetraro to the bishops of San Marco. In 1411 Pope Gregory XII sold Cetraro to King Ladislaus of Naples.

In 1912, the diocese contained 64 parishes, 256 priests, 110,000 inhabitants, some convents of religious, and a house of nuns.

On February 13, 1919, congregations within the diocese were transferred to form the Eparchy of Lungro in the Italo-Albanian Catholic Church. On April 4, 1979, Bisignano passed to Cosenza and the Diocese was renamed to San Marco Argentano–Scalea. On January 30, 2001, the Archdiocese of Cosenza-Bisignano was elevated to a metropolitan see, with the Diocese of San Marco Argentano-Scalea as a suffragan.

== Cathedrals ==
The Cathedral of Saint Nicholas in San Marco had a Chapter composed of six dignities and twelve Canons. The dignities were: the Archdeacon, the Dean, the Cantor, the Treasurer, the Archpriest, and the Primicerius. One of the twelve Canons, called the Canon of S. Marco, was the Theologian of the Chapter. The Chapter currently (2017) has six dignities (Dean, Primicerius, Theologian, Treasurer, Penitentiary, and Cantor), seven Canons, and four honorary Canons.

The Cathedral of Bisignano, which was dedicated to the Bodily Assumption of the Blessed Virgin Mary into Heaven, also had a Chapter. It was composed of eight dignities and twenty Canons. The dignities were: the Archdeacon, the Dean, the Cantor, the Treasurer, the Sub-Cantor (Succentor), the Archpriest, the Penitentiary, and the Theologian.

There was only one Collegiate Church in both of the dioceses, Santa Maria del Popolo in Belvedere Marittimo. It had four dignities (Archdeacon, Archpriest, Dean and Treasurer). It was founded in 1608 and lasted only thirty years.

The Diocese has a Minor Basilica, the Basilica of the Blessed Mary of Pettoruto in San Sosti, Cosenza, Calabria.

== Bishops ==
=== Diocese of San Marco (Argentano) ===
Erected: before 1171
Latin Name: Sancti Marci
Immediately Subject to the Holy See

==== to 1400 ====
- Ruben (attested 1171 – 1183)
- Hunfredus (attested 1195 – 1199)
- Nicolaus (1205), Bishop-Elect
- Ignotus (1216)
- Ignotus (1218)
- Andreas (attested November 1220 – September 1236)
- Fabianus (18 July 1256 – ?)
- Francesco da Taverna, O.Min. ( ? )
- Marbellus (attested 29 August 1272 – July 1274)

Sede vacante

- Pietro de Morano, O.Min. (April 1275? – ? )
- Marcus (21 January 1283 – 25 February 1286)
- Manfredus (28 January 1287 – )
- Thomas, O.Cist. (26 August 1323 – 1348)
- Bertucio de Citrano, O.Min. (3 October 1348 – 1349)
- Giovanni (18 May 1349 – 1374?)
- Nicolaus (30 October 1374 – )
- Petrus Roncella (24 October 1379 – ) (Avignon Obedience)
- Philippus de Legonio (?) (Roman Obedience)
- Tommaso Mari (c. 1397 – c. 1399)
- Dominicus de Sora (30 July 1399 – 1400)

==== 1400–1600 ====
- Ma(i)nerius, O.S.B. (11 June 1400 – 1404) (Roman Obedience)
- Ludovicus Imbriacus, O.S.B.Casin. (17 March 1404 – 1435)
- Antonio Calà (26 October 1435 – 11 February 1446)
- Goffridus de Castro de Cola (11 February 1446 – 1483?)
- Rutilius Zenonis (26 January 1484 – 1514, resigned)
- Luigi de Amato (26 Jan 1515 – 1530 Died)
- Coriolanus de Martyranis (20 Jun 1530 – 1551 Died)
- Giovanni Antonio della Tolfa (15 Dec 1557 – 1562 Resigned)
- Pietro della Tolfa (17 Apr 1562 – Jul 1562 Died)
- Fabrizio Landriani (31 Aug 1562 – 1566 Died)
- Guglielmo Sirleto (6 Sep 1566 – 27 Feb 1568 Appointed Bishop of Squillace)
- Organtino Scaroli (Scazola) (1 Apr 1569 – 1572 Died)
- Ippolito Bosco (16 Jun 1572 – 30 Jan 1576 Appointed Bishop of Foligno)
- Matteo Andrea Guerra (30 Jan 1576 – 1578 Died)
- Giovanni Antonio Grignetta (2 Jun 1578 – 1585 Died)
- Marco Antonio del Tufo (10 May 1585 – 21 Oct 1585 Appointed Bishop of Mileto)
- Francesco Antonio D'Affitto (21 Oct 1585 – 1586 Died)
- Antonio Migliori (13 Oct 1586 – 1591 Resigned)
- Ludovico Alferio (20 Mar 1591 – 26 Mar 1594 Died)
- Giovanni Girolamo Pisano (3 Oct 1594 – 6 Jun 1602 Died)

==== 1600–1810 ====
- Aurelio Novarini, O.F.M. Conv. (1 Jul 1602 – Sep 1606 Died)
- Giovanni Vincenzo Cansachi (Consacco) (10 Dec 1607 – 1613 Died)
- Gabriele Naro (Nari), O.P. (13 Nov 1613 – 16 Nov 1623 Died)
- Giovanni Battista Indelli (1 Jul 1624 – 28 Oct 1629 Died)
- Consalvo Caputo (18 Feb 1630 – 8 Aug 1633 Appointed Bishop of Catanzaro)
- Defendente Brusati (26 Sep 1633 – 22 Nov 1647 Died)
- Giacinto Cevoli, O.P. (2 Mar 1648 – 1651 Died)
- Teodoro Fantoni, C.R.L. (19 Feb 1652 – 27 Jul 1684 Died)
- Antonio Papa (26 Mar 1685 – 10 Jul 1687 Died)
- Pietro Antonio d'Alessandro (31 May 1688 – 28 Sep 1693 Died)
- Francesco Maria Federico Carafa, C.R. (25 Jan 1694 – 7 Apr 1704
- Matteo Gennaro Sibilia (19 May 1704 – 21 Sep 1709 Died)
- Bernardo Cavalieri, C.R. (11 Feb 1718 – Jul 1728 Died)
- Alessandro Magno, O.Cist. (20 Sep 1728 – 7 Sep 1745 Died)
- Matteo (Marcello) Sacchi (22 Nov 1745 – 3 Sep 1746 Died)
- Nicola Brescia (15 May 1747 – 2 Feb 1768 Died)
- Baldassare Barone de Moncada (20 Jun 1768 – 11 Apr 1789 Died)
- Reginaldo Coppola, O.P. (18 Dec 1797 Confirmed – 7 Feb 1810 Died)

Sede vacante (1810–1818)

=== Diocese of San Marco e Bisignano ===
United: 27 June 1818 with the Diocese of Bisignano
Latin Name: Sancti Marci et Bisinianensis
Immediately Subject to the Holy See

- Pasquale Mazzei (27 Sep 1819 Confirmed – 16 Feb 1823 Died)
- Felice Greco (3 May 1824 Confirmed – 22 Feb 1840 Died)
- Nicola Majerà Mariano Marsico (22 Jul 1842 Confirmed – 14 Oct 1846 Died)
- Livio Parlandore (Parladore; Parlatore) (28 Sep 1849 Confirmed – 19 Sep 1888 Died)
- Stanislao Maria de Luca (19 Sep 1888 Succeeded – 18 May 1894 Appointed Bishop of San Severo)
- Luigi Pugliese (5 Jun 1895 – 22 Jun 1896 Appointed Bishop of Ugento)
- Carlo Vincenzo Ricotta (22 Jun 1896 – 14 Jan 1909 Died)
- Salvatore Scanu (30 Jun 1909 – 22 Jan 1932 Died)
- Demetrio Moscato (24 Jun 1932 – 22 Jan 1945 Appointed Archbishop of Salerno)
- Michele Rateni (6 Jun 1945 – 7 Jul 1953 Died)
- Agostino Ernesto Castrillo, O.F.M. (17 Sep 1953 – 17 Oct 1955 Died)
- Luigi Rinaldi (22 Feb 1956 – 1977 Retired)

=== Diocese of San Marco Argentano-Scalea ===
4 April 1979 United with the Archdiocese of Cosenza which was then split to form the Archdiocese of Cosenza e Bisignano and the Diocese of San Marco Argentano-Scalea
Latin Name: Sancti Marci Argentanensis-Scaleensis

- Augusto Lauro (7 Apr 1979 – 6 Mar 1999 Retired)
- Domenico Crusco (6 Mar 1999 – 7 Jan 2011 Retired)
- Leonardo Antonio Paolo Bonanno (7 Jan 2011 – 10 Dec 2022 Retired)
- Stefano Rega (10 Dec 2022 – )

== Bibliography ==
=== Reference works ===
- Gams, Pius Bonifatius (1873). Series episcoporum Ecclesiae catholicae: quotquot innotuerunt a beato Petro apostolo. Ratisbon: Typis et Sumptibus Georgii Josephi Manz. pp. 892–893. (Use with caution; obsolete)
- Eubel, Conradus, ed. (1913). Hierarchia catholica, Tomus 1 (second ed.). Münster: Libreria Regensbergiana. p. 377. (in Latin)
- Eubel, Conradus, ed. (1914). Hierarchia catholica, Tomus 2 (second ed.). Münster: Libreria Regensbergiana. p. 207.
- Eubel, Conradus; Gulik, Guilelmus, eds. (1923). Hierarchia catholica, Tomus 3 (second ed.). Münster: Libreria Regensbergiana. pp. 262–263.
- Gauchat, Patritius (Patrice), ed. (1935). Hierarchia catholica IV (1592-1667). Münster: Libraria Regensbergiana. p. 264.
- Ritzler, Remigius; Sefrin, Pirminus (1952). Hierarchia catholica medii et recentis aevi V (1667-1730). Patavii: Messagero di S. Antonio. p. 297.
- Ritzler, Remigius; Sefrin, Pirminus (1958). Hierarchia catholica medii et recentis aevi VI (1730-1799). Patavii: Messagero di S. Antonio. p. 318.
- Ritzler, Remigius; Sefrin, Pirminus (1968). Hierarchia Catholica medii et recentioris aevi sive summorum pontificum, S. R. E. cardinalium, ecclesiarum antistitum series... A pontificatu Pii PP. VII (1800) usque ad pontificatum Gregorii PP. XVI (1846) (in Latin). Vol. VII. Monasterii: Libr. Regensburgiana.
- Ritzler, Remigius; Pirminus Sefrin (1978). Hierarchia catholica Medii et recentioris aevi... A Pontificatu PII PP. IX (1846) usque ad Pontificatum Leonis PP. XIII (1903) (in Latin). Vol. VIII. Il Messaggero di S. Antonio.
- Pięta, Zenon (2002). Hierarchia catholica medii et recentioris aevi... A pontificatu Pii PP. X (1903) usque ad pontificatum Benedictii PP. XV (1922) (in Latin). Vol. IX. Padua: Messagero di San Antonio. ISBN 978-88-250-1000-8.

=== Studies ===
- Cappelletti, Giuseppe (1870). Le chiese d'Italia: dalla loro origine sino ai nostri giorni (in Italian). Vol. vigesimo primo (21). Venezia: G. Antonelli. pp. 406–411.
- Cristofaro, Salvatore (1898). Cronistoria della città di S. Marco Argentano (in Italian). Cosenza: Raffaele Riccio.
- D'Avino, Vincenzio (1848). Cenni storici sulle chiese arcivescovili, vescovili, e prelatizie (nullius) del regno delle due Sicilie (in Italian). Naples: dalle stampe di Ranucci. pp. 65–72.
- Duchesne, Louis (1902), "Les évèchés de Calabre," Mélanges Paul Fabre: études d'histoire du moyen âge (in French). Paris: A. Picard et fils. 1902. pp. 1–16.
- Kamp, Norbert (1975). Kirche und Monarchie im staufischen Königreich Sizilien: I. Prosopographische Grundlegung, Bistumer und Bistümer und Bischöfe des Konigreichs 1194–1266: 2. Apulien und Calabrien München: Wilhelm Fink 1975.
- Kehr, Paulus Fridolin (1975). Italia pontificia. Regesta pontificum Romanorum. Vol. X: Calabria–Insulae. Berlin: Weidmann. (in Latin)
- Taccone-Gallucci, Domenico (1902). Regesti dei Romani pontefici della Calabria (in Italian). Rome: Tip. Vaticana. p. 402.
- Ughelli, Ferdinando; Coleti, Niccolo (1721). Italia Sacra Sive De Episcopis Italiae, Et Insularum adiacentium (in Latin). Vol. Tomus primus (1). Venice: Antonio Coleti. pp. 876–882.
