= Suburbicarian Diocese of Velletri–Segni =

Roman Catholic diocese in Italy

Suburbicarian Diocese of Velletri–Segni Veliternus-Signinus

Catholic
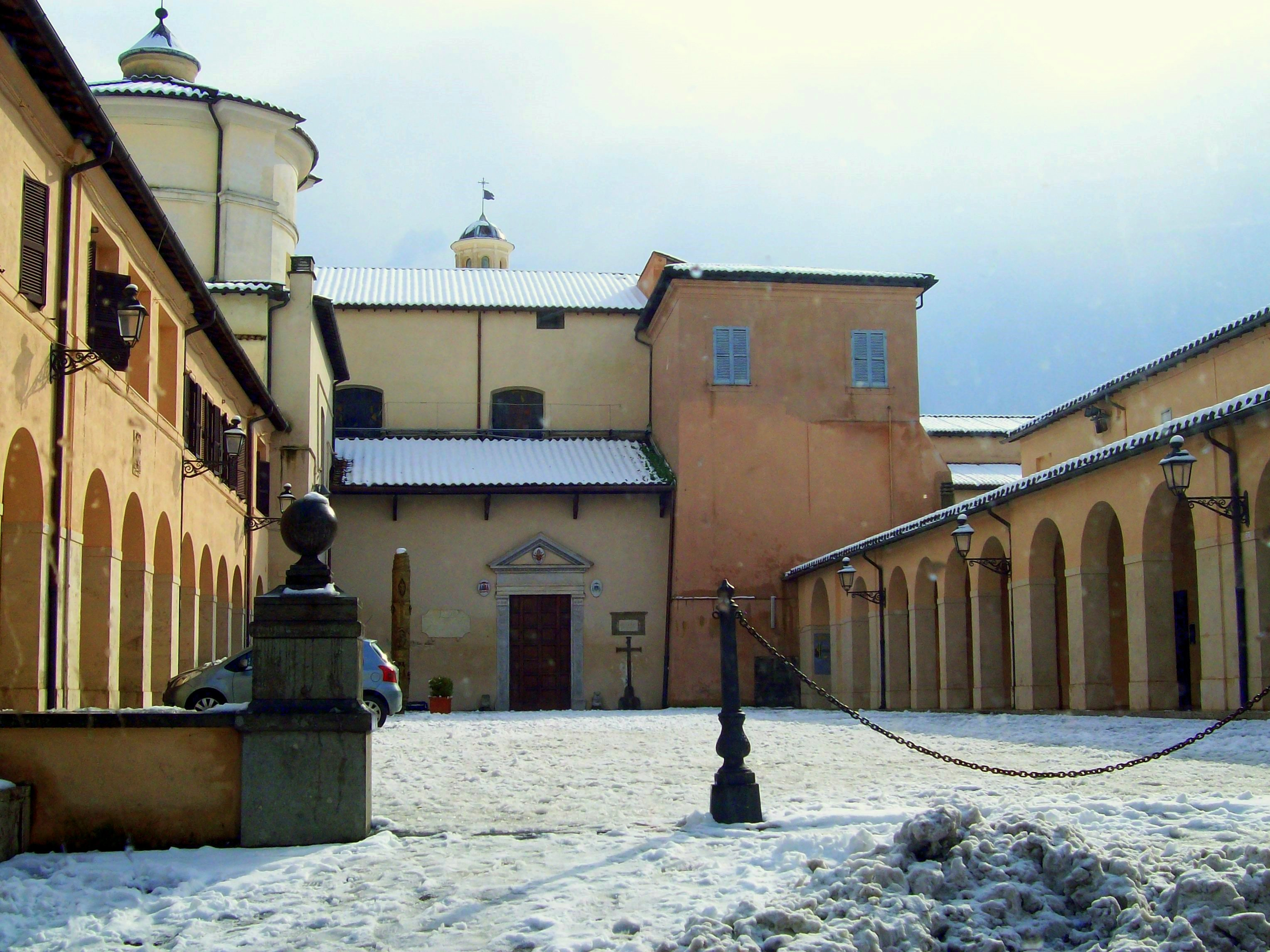
- Cathedral of Saint Clement

Location
- Country: Italy
- Ecclesiastical province: Rome

Statistics
- Area: 397 km^{2} (153 sq mi)
- Population: Total; Catholics: (as of 2021); 136,120; 127,245 (93.5%)
- Parishes: 27

Information
- Denomination: Catholic Church
- Sui iuris church: Latin Church
- Rite: Roman Rite
- Cathedral: Velletri Cathedral
- Co-cathedral: Santa Maria Assunta
- Language: Italian

Current leadership
- Pope: Leo XIV
- Bishop: Francis Arinze (Cardinal-bishop); Stefano Russo (Diocesan bishop)

Map
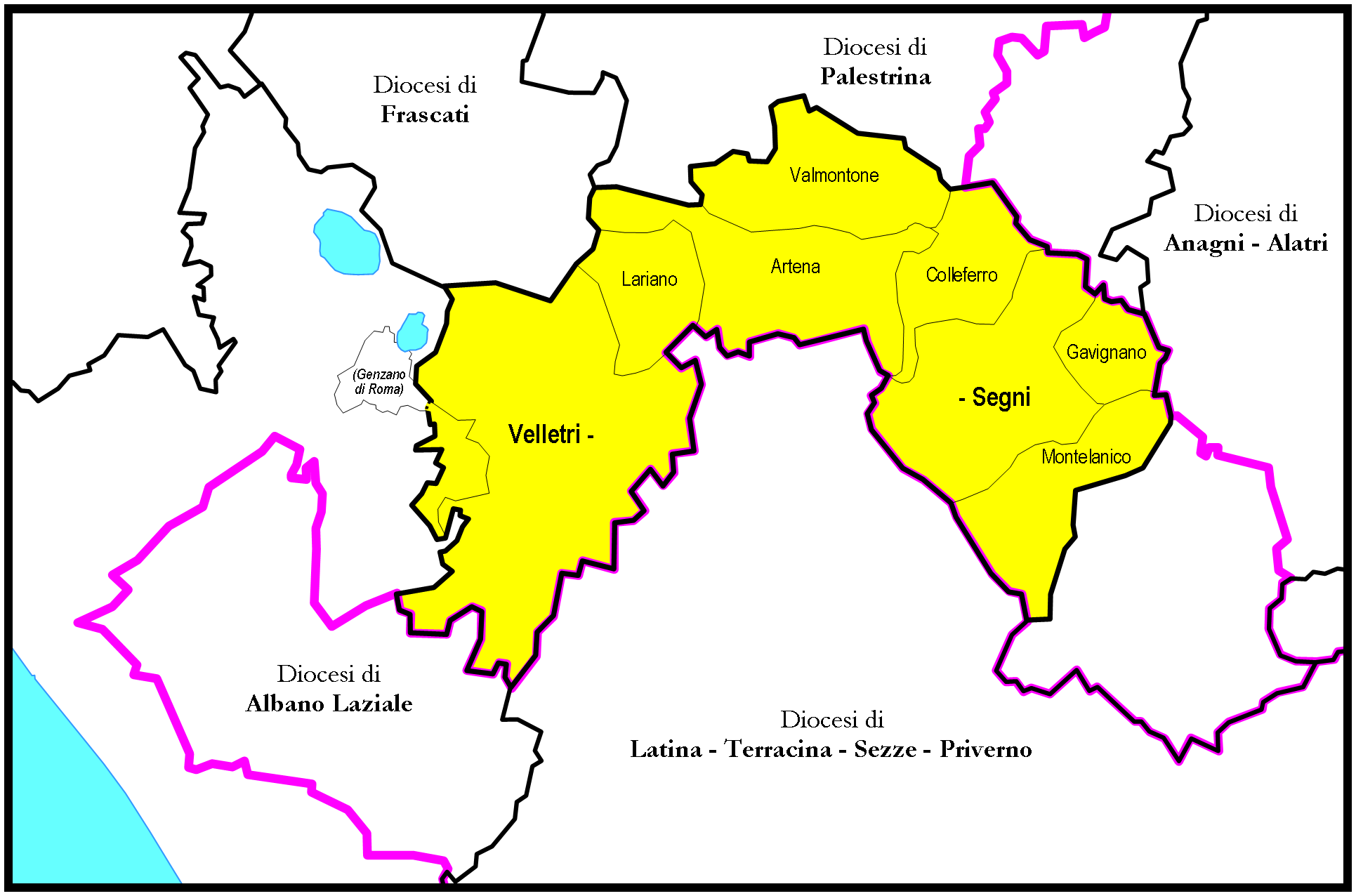

Website
- www.diocesivelletrisegni.it

The Suburbicarian Diocese of Velletri–Segni is one of the Latin suburbicarian dioceses, Catholic dioceses in Italy close to Rome with a special status and a cardinal bishop, the bishop of Velletri–Segni. Historically, the see of Velletri was combined with the see of Ostia from 1060 to 1914.

The cathedral in the city of Velletri is dedicated to Saint Clement.

Segni was a small town, a former Roman colony, sited approximately halfway between Rome and Montecassino. In the 12th century, the diocese possessed only seven castelli, 37 churches, 3 chapels, and 3 cloisters.

== Separation of Ostia and Velletri ==
By the beginning of the 20th century, it had become apparent to the papacy that the suburbicarian bishops had become overburdened with the responsibilities of their curial and diocesan duties. The increase in commerce, in roads and travel, and the migration of people to the city, as well as the increased burden of duties in the papal administration because of the mass and complexity of problems affecting the Church, made some sort of relief necessary. Pope Pius X therefore issued a document, Apostolicae Romanorum Pontificium, granting the bishops of Ostia, Porto, Palestrina, and Frascati each a suffragan bishop to carry the burden of their pastoral duties in their dioceses. The diocese of Sabina and Velletri are stated to already have had a suffragan bishop, whose powers were in any case henceforth augmented and regulated by Apostolicae Romanorum Pontificium. The appointment of the suffragan bishops was reserved to the Pope. They had full powers inside the diocese, subject to the cardinal bishop's approval, except for the power to ordain or consecrate, or the right to have a throne or display their coat-of-arms.

In 1914, after consulting with the curial cardinals and with their agreement, he issued the document Edita a Nobis. Henceforth, the diocese of Velletri would no longer be permanently united to that of Ostia, so that the suburbicarian dioceses would be: Ostia, Porto and Santa Rufina, Albano, Palestrina, Sabina, Frascati and Velletri. However, by an additional provision a cardinal bishop promoted to the suburbicarian see of Ostia would also retain his previous suburbicarian see. As to financial aspects, in future the incomes of the cardinal bishops would be placed in a single fund, administered by the Office of Economic Affairs, to which each cardinal would render an annual account. Each year, after 6,000 Lire had been given to each suffragan bishop, the remaining money collected was to be divided into equal portions, the bishop of Ostia receiving two portions, and each of the other cardinal bishops one portion.

== Joining of Velletri and Segni ==
In 1981, the Diocese of Velletri was combined with the Diocese of Segni.

The Cardinal-Bishop is now the titular bishop of the diocese, while the diocesan bishop administers the diocese.

== Reorganization of dioceses ==
In a decree of the Second Vatican Council, it was recommended that dioceses be reorganized to take into account modern developments. A project begun on orders from Pope John XXIII, and continued under his successors, was intended to reduce the number of dioceses in Italy and to rationalize their borders in terms of modern population changes and shortages of clergy. The change was made urgent because of changes made to the Concordat between the Italian State and the Holy See on 18 February 1984, and embodied in a law of 3 June 1985. The change was approved by Pope John Paul II in an audience of 27 September 1986, and by a decree of the Sacred Congregation of Bishops on 30 September 1986. The diocese of Segni was united to the diocese of Velletri. Its name was to be Dioecesis Veliterna-Signina. The seat of the diocese was to be in Velletri. The former cathedral in Segni was to have the honorary title of co-cathedral, and its Chapter was to be called the Capitulum Concathedralis. There was to be only one episcopal curia, one seminary, one ecclesiastical tribunal; and all the clergy were to be incardinated in the diocese of Velletri-Segni. The territory of the diocese was to be the same as the two dioceses combined.

The bishop of Velletri-Segni, Marin Gomiero, was given the authority to carry out the papal decree.

== Bishops of Velletri and of Segni ==
=== Bishops of Velletri (465–1060) ===
- Adeodatus, 465
- Bonifatius, 487
- Silvinus, 501
- vacant
- John I, 592
- Potentinus, 649
- Placentinus, 680
- John II, 721
- Gratiosus (Grosso), 743
- Gratian, 761
- Citonatus, 761–769 (Bishop of Porto, 769)
- Gregory I, 769–775 (Bishop of Santa Rufina, 761–769)
- Theodore, 780
- Gregory II 826–853
- John III, 853–867
- Gaudericus of Velletri, 867–879
- John IV, 896–898
- Leo I 946–963
- Theobaldo 996–1027
- Leo II, 1032–1038
- Amato, 1044
- Johannes 1050
- Benedictus 1057
- Johannes Mincius (1058–1060)

United with Ostia in April 1060

=== Bishops of Ostia and Velletri (1060–1915) ===
==== to 1378 ====
Sources for the period 1057–1130: Klewitz (1957), and Hüls (1977). For the period 1130–81: J.M.Brixius.

- Peter Damian, 1060–1072
- Gerald of Ostia, 1072–1077
- Odo I de Lagery, 1080–1088 (became Pope Urban II)
- Odo II, ca.1088–1102
- Leo of Ostia, ca.1106–1115
- Lamberto Scannabecchi, 1116–1124 (later Pope Honorius II)
- Giovanni of Camaldoli, 1126–1133/35,
- Drogo de Champagne, 1136–1138
- Alberic, 1138–1148
- Guido II de Summa, 1149–1151
- Hugo, 1151–1158
- Ubaldo Allucingoli, 1159–1181/84 (became Pope Lucius III in 1181)
- Theobald, 1184–1188
- Ottaviano di Paoli, 1189–1206
- Ugolino di Conti 1206–1227/31 (became Pope Gregory IX)
- Rinaldo dei Signori di Ienne, 1231–1254/61 (became Pope Alexander IV in 1254)
- Hugh of Saint-Cher 1261–1262
- Enrico Bartolomei 1262–1271

vacant 1271–1273

- Peter VI de Tarentaise, 1273–1276 (later Pope Innocent V, † 1276)
- vacant 1276–1278
- Latino Malabranca Orsini, 1278–1294
- Hugh Aycelin, 1294–1297
  - Leonardo Patrasso, apostolic administrator 1298–1299
- Niccolo I Boccasini, 1300–1303 (became Pope Benedict XI)
- Niccolò Alberti, 1303–1321
- Regnaud de la Porte, 1321–1325

vacant 1325–1327

- Bertrand du Pouget, 1327–1352
- Étienne Aubert, 1352
- Pierre Bertrand du Colombier, 1353–1361
- Andouin Aubert, 1361–1363
- Elie de Saint Yrieux, 1363–1367
- Guillaume de la Sudrie, 1367–1373
- Pierre d'Estaing, 1373–1377
- Bertrand Lagier, O.Min., 1378 (Avignon Obedience)

==== The western schism: Rome ====
vacant 1378–1388

- Philippe of Alençon, 1388–1397
- Angelo Acciaioli, 1397–1408

vacant 1408–1415

==== The western schism: Avignon ====
(after 1415 restricted to Peñíscola)

- Bertrand Lagier, 1378–1392
- John de Neufchatel, 1392–1398
- Leonardo Rossi da Giffoni, 1398–1405
- Jean-Allarmet de Brogny, 1405–1408

vacant 1408–1423

- Julian Lobera y Valtierra, 1423–1429 (restricted to Peñíscola)

==== The western schism: Pisa ====
- Jean-Allarmet de Brogny, 1409–1415
- Jean-Allarmet de Brogny, 1415–1426

==== Since the end of the schism ====
- Antonio Correr, 1431–1445
- Juan de Cervantes, 1447–1453
- Giorgio Fieschi, 1455–1461
- Guillaume d'Estouteville, 1461–1483
- Giuliano della Rovere, 1483–1503, (became Pope Julius II)
- Oliviero Carafa, 1503–1511
- Raffaele Riario Sansoni, 1511–1521
- Bernardino Lopez de Carvajal, 1521–1523
- Francesco Soderini 1523–1524
- Niccolò Fieschi 1524
- Alessandro Farnese 1524–1534 (became Pope Paul III)
- Giovanni Piccolomini, 1535–1537
- Giovanni Domenico de Cupis, 1537–1553
- Giovanni Pietro Carafa, 1553–1555 (became Pope Paul IV)
- Jean du Bellay 1555–1560
- François de Tournon, 1560–1562
- Rodolfo Pio de Carpi, 1562–1564
- Francesco Pisani, 1564–1570
- Giovanni Morone, 1570–1580
- Alessandro Farnese, 1580–1589
- Giovanni Antonio Serbelloni, 1589–1591
- Alfonso Gesualdo de Conza, 1591–1603
- Tolomeo Gallio, 1603–1607
- Domenico Pinelli, 1607–1611
- François de Joyeuse, 1611–1615
- Antonio Maria Galli, 1615–1620
- Antonio Maria Sauli, 1620–1623
- Francesco Maria Bourbon del Monte, 1623–1626
- Ottavio Bandini, 1626–1629
- Giovanni Battista Deti, 1629–1630
- Domenico Ginnasi, 1630–1639
- Carlo Emanuele Pio di Savoia, 1639–1641
- Marcello Lante della Rovere, 1641–1652
- Carlo I de Medici, 1652–1666
- Francesco V Barberini, 1666–1679
- Cesare Facchinetti, 1680–1683
- Niccolò Albergati-Ludovisi, 1683–1687
- Alderano Cybo, 1687–1700
- Emmanuel Théodose de la Tour d'Auvergne, 1700–1715
- Nicolò Acciaioli, 1715–1719
- Fulvio Astalli, 1719–1721
- Sebastiano Antonio Tanara, 1721–1724
- Francesco del Giudice, 1724–1725
- Fabrizio Paolucci, 1725–1726
- Francesco Barberini, 1726–1738
- Pietro Ottoboni, 1738–1740
- Tommaso Ruffo, 1740–1753
- Pietro Luigi Carafa, 1753–1755
- Rainiero d'Elci, 1755–1761
- Giuseppe Spinelli, 1761–1763
- Carlo Alberto Guidoboni Cavalchini, 1763–1774
- Fabrizio Serbelloni, 1774–1775
- Giovanni Francesco Albani, 1775–1803
- Henry Benedict Stuart, 1803–1807
- Leonardo II Antonelli, 1807–1811
- Alessandro Mattei, 1814–1820
- Giulio Maria della Somaglia, 1820–1830
- Bartolomeo Pacca, 1830–1844
- Lodovico Micara, 1844–1847
- Vincenzo Macchi, 1847–1860
- Mario Mattei, 1860–1870
- Costantino Patrizi Naro, 1870–1876
- Luigi Amat di San Filippo e Sorso, 1877–1878
- Camillo di Pietro, 1878–1884
- Carlo Sacconi, 1884–1889
- Raffaele Monaco La Valletta, 1889–1896
- Luigi Oreglia di Santo Stefano, 1896–1913
- Serafino Vannutelli, 1913–1914

=== Bishops of Velletri (1914–1981) ===
- Diomede Falconio, 1914–1917
- Basilio Pompili, 1917–1931
- Bonaventura Cerretti, 1933
- Enrico Gasparri, 1933–1946
- Clemente Micara, 1946–1965
- Fernando Cento, 1965–1973
- Ildebrando Antoniutti, 1973–1974
- Sebastiano Baggio, 1974–1981

=== Bishops of Segni (494–1981) ===
- Santulus, 494-499
- Justus, 501-504
- Julianus, 551
- Albinus, 649
- Gaudiosus, 678-679
- Joannes, 721-745
- Jordanus, 769
- Hadrianus, 826
- Theodorus (Theodosius) c. 830
- Bonipertus, 853
- Joannes (II), 861-879
- Stephanus, 963-984
- Robertus, 1015–1036
- Erasmus, 1059–1071
- Bruno of Segni, 1079–1123
- Trasmundus, 1123–1138
- Joannes (III), c. 1138–1178
- Petrus (I), 1179–1206
- J... (attested 1207)
- Bernardus, (c. 1230)
- Bartholomaeus (I), (attested 1254–1264)
- Joannes (IV), 1264
- Petrus (II), 1281–1285
- Bartholomaeus (II), 1289
- Petrus de Brunaco, 1291–1291
- Jacobus (I), 1291–1303
- Petrus (IV), 1303–1320
- Bartholomaeus (III), 1320–1333
- Arnoldus, 1333–1345
- Guilielmus, 1345–1346
- Petrus Vera, 1346–1347
- Guilielmus Ribati, 1348
- Michael Matthaei, O.Carm. 1348
- Sixtus de Ferentino, O.Min. (Avignon Obedience), 1381
- Thomas c. 1381–1395 (Roman Obedience)
- Antonius, O.Min. (Roman Obedience) 1395–1402
- Nicolaus, 1402–1418
- Georgius, 1418–1427
- Nicolaus de Aspra, 1427
- Gregorius Nardi, 1427-1429
- Galganus Bucci de Verulis, 1429–1434
- Jacobus Zancati, 1434–1435
- Joannes (V), 1435
- Ludovicus, 1436–1443
- Petrus Antonius Petrucci, 1445
- Silvester de Pianca, 1456
- Panhutius de Conti, 1468–1481
- Lucius Fazini "Fosforo", 1482–1503
- Vincentius de Maffei, 1503–1507?
- Ludovicus de Viterbio 1507–1527
- Laurentius Grana, 1528–1539
- Sebastiano Graziani, 1539–1541
- Bernardinus Callini, O.Min.Obs., 1541–1549
- Carolus Traversari, 1549–1552
- Ambrosius Monticoli, 1551–1569
- Giuseppe Pamphilj, O.E.S.A., 1570–1581
- Jacobus Masini, 1581–1602
- Antonius Guerreschi, O.Min.Conv., 1603–1605
- Johannes Ludovicus Pasolini, 1606–1625
- Ludovicus de Actis, 1625–1632
- Octavius Orsini 1632,–1640
- Franciscus Romulus Mileti, 1640–1643
- Andreas Borgia, 1643–1655
- Guarnierius Guarnieri, 1655–1682

Sede vacante, 1682–1684

- Francesco Maria Giannotti, 1684–1699
- Horatius Minimi, 1699–1701
- Petrus Corbelli, 1701–1708
- Michael Ellis, O.S.B., 1708–1726
- Johannes Franciscus Bisleti, 1726–1749
- Fredericus Muschi, 1749–1755
- Caesar Crescentio de Angelis, 1755–1765
- Andreas Spani, 1766–1784
- Paulus Ciotti, 1784–1819
- Franciscus Stracchini, 1819–1823
- Petrus Antonius Luciani, 1824–1840
- Jacobus Traversi, 1841–1845
- Johannes Pellei, 1845–1847
- Ludovicus Ricci, 1847–1877
- Antonius Maria Testa, 1877–1883
- Blasius (Biagio) Sibilia, 1883–1893
- Costantinus Costa, 1893–1897
- Pancrazio Giorgi 1898–1915
- Angelo Maria Filippo Sinibaldi, 1915–1928
- Alfonso Marie de Sanctis, 1928–1933
- Fulvio Tessaroli, 1933–1952
- Pietro Severi, 1953–1957
- Luigi Maria Carli, 1957–1973
- Dante Bernini, 1975–1981

=== Bishops of Velletri-Segni (since 1981) ===
==== Cardinal-Bishops of Velletri-Segni ====
- Sebastiano Baggio, 1981–1993
- Joseph Ratzinger, 1993–2005 (became Pope Benedict XVI)
- Francis Arinze, since 2005

==== Diocesan Bishops of Velletri-Segni ====
- Dante Bernini, 1981–1982 (Diocesan Bishop of Velletri and also of Segni, 1975–1981)
- Martino Gomiero, 1982–1988
- Andrea Maria Erba, 1988–2006
- Vincenzo Apicella, 2006–2022
- Stefano Russo, 2022–present

== Bibliography ==
- Borgia, Alessandro (1723). Storia della Chiesa, e citta di Velletri descritta in quattro libri. (in Italian) Velletri: per Antonio Mariotti 1723.
- Bräuer, Martin (2014). Handbuch der Kardinäle: 1846-2012 (in German). De Gruyter. ISBN 978-3-11-026947-5.
- Brixius, Johann Matthias (1912). Die Mitglieder des Kardinalkollegiums voin 1130–1181 (in German), Berlin: R. Trenkel 1912.
- Cappelletti, Giuseppe (1844). Le chiese d'Italia. Volume primo. (in Italian) Venezia: Giuseppe Antonelli, pp. 454–464; 465-487.
- Gams, Pius Bonifatius (1873). Series episcoporum Ecclesiae catholicae: quotquot innotuerunt a beato Petro apostolo (in Latin). Ratisbon: Typis et Sumptibus Georgii Josephi Manz. pp. 747–748.
- Eubel, Conradus, ed. (1913). Hierarchia catholica (in Latin). Vol. Tomus 1 (second ed.). Münster: Libreria Regensbergiana.
- Eubel, Conradus, ed. (1914). Hierarchia catholica (in Latin). Vol. Tomus 2 (second ed.). Münster: Libreria Regensbergiana.
- Eubel, Conradus (1913). Hierarchia catholica (in Latin). Vol. Tomus 3 (second ed.). Münster: Libreria Regensbergiana.
- Gauchat, Patritius (Patrice) (1935). Hierarchia catholica (in Latin). Vol. Tomus IV (1592-1667). Münster: Libraria Regensbergiana.
- Hüls, Rudolf (1977). Kardinäle, Klerus und Kirchen Roms: 1049-1130 (in German), Tübingen: Max Niemeyer 1977.
- Jaffé, Philipp, Regesta Pontificum Romanorum ab condita ecclesia ad annum p. Chr. n. 1198 (in Latin); 2nd ed. by S. Löwenfeld, F. Kaltenbrunner, P. Ewald Vol 1. Leipzig, 1888.
- Kehr, Paul Fridolin (1907). Italia pontificia (in Latin). Vol. II: Latium. Berlin: Weidmann. pp. 101–112.
- Klewitz, Hans-Walter (1957). Reformpapsttum und Kardinalkolleg (in German), Darmstadt 1957.
- Lanzoni, Francesco (1927). Le diocesi d'Italia dalle origini al principio del secolo VII (an. 604). (in Italian) Faenza: F. Lega, pp. 145–147.
- Lentz III, Harris M. (2002). Popes and Cardinals of the 20th Century: A Biographical Dictionary. McFarland & Company, Inc. ISBN 9781476621555.
- Ritzler, Remigius; Sefrin, Pirminus (1952). Hierarchia catholica medii et recentis aevi V (1667-1730). Patavii: Messagero di S. Antonio.
- Ritzler, Remigius; Sefrin, Pirminus (1958). Hierarchia catholica medii et recentis aevi. Vol. Tomus VI (1730-1799). Patavii: Messagero di S. Antonio. (in Latin)
- Ritzler, Remigius; Sefrin, Pirminus (1968). Hierarchia Catholica medii et recentioris aevi sive summorum pontificum, S. R. E. cardinalium, ecclesiarum antistitum series... A pontificatu Pii PP. VII (1800) usque ad pontificatum Gregorii PP. XVI (1846) (in Latin). Vol. VII. Monasterii: Libr. Regensburgiana.
- Remigius Ritzler; Pirminus Sefrin (1978). Hierarchia catholica Medii et recentioris aevi... A Pontificatu PII PP. IX (1846) usque ad Pontificatum Leonis PP. XIII (1903) (in Latin). Vol. VIII. Il Messaggero di S. Antonio.
- Pięta, Zenon (2002). Hierarchia catholica medii et recentioris aevi... A pontificatu Pii PP. X (1903) usque ad pontificatum Benedictii PP. XV (1922) (in Latin). Vol. IX. Padua: Messagero di San Antonio. ISBN 978-88-250-1000-8.
- Schwartz, Gerhard (1907). Die Besetzung der Bistümer Reichsitaliens unter den sächsischen und salischen Kaisern: mit den Listen der Bischöfe, 951-1122. (in German) Leipzig: B.G. Teubner. pp. 275–277.
