= Bishop of Mayo =

The Bishop of Mayo was an episcopal title which took its name after the village of Mayo in Ireland. After the Reformation, the title was briefly used by the Church of Ireland until 1559 and by the Roman Catholic Church until 1631. With each denomination, the bishopric was united to the archbishopric of Tuam.

== History ==
The diocese of Mayo was not established at the Synod of Rathbreasail in 1111, but was recognised at the Synod of Kells in 1152. A bishop of Mayo, probably Gille Ísa Ua Maílín, took the oath of fealty to King Henry II of England in 1172. The bishopric in some way represented the lordship of Muirchertach Muimhnech Ua Conchobair taniste of Connacht, who died in 1210, and his family Clan Murtagh O'Conor, who controlled the area up to the 1230s.

In 1202, the papal legate, Cardinal John, had the see of Mayo united to the archbishopric of Tuam. In 1216, Pope Innocent III heard the case in Rome, and gave sentence in favour of Tuam. His sentence was maintained by papal legate James in 1221, and was finally confirmed by Pope Gregory IX on 3 July 1240. However, in the first half of the fifteenth century, Mayo appears to have gained independence with further bishops of Mayo being appointed, although their position is unclear and may have been assistant or suffragan bishops.

Following the Reformation, there were parallel successions in the Church of Ireland and the Roman Catholic Church. Circa 1559, the see was united with the archbishopric of Tuam in the Church of Ireland. The Roman Catholic see continued until the early seventeenth century, when, after a long vacancy, it was united into the archdiocese of Tuam in 1631.

== List of bishops ==
=== Pre-Reformation bishops ===
Pre-Reformation Bishops of Mayo
From	Until	Incumbent	Notes
before 1172	1184	Gille Ísa Ua Maílín	Died in office
unknown	1210	Céle Ua Dubhthaig	Died in office
c.1210	1216	? Patricius	Elected circa 1210; resigned 1216, and possibly died in the same year
1216	1428	See held by the archbishops of Tuam	
1428		(William Prendergast)	Appointed 16 July 1428, but did not take effect
1430	1436	Nicholas 'Wogmay'	Appointed 17 July 1430; died after October 1436
1432	1439	Martinus Campania, O.Cist.	Appointed 29 April 1432; acted as a suffragan bishop in the ecclesiastical principalities of Münster and Utrecht; resigned before 31 August 1439
1439	1448	Aodh Ó hUiginn, O.S.A.	Appointed 31 August 1439; deprived before January 1448; died 1478
1448	1457	No bishops appointed	
1457	1470	Simon de Duren	Appointed 12 August 1457; acted as a suffragan bishop in the ecclesiastical principalities of Münster and Worms in 1461; died 28 August 1470
1470	1493	No bishops appointed	

=== Bishops during the Reformation ===
Bishops of Mayo during the Reformation
From	Until	Incumbent	Notes
1493	c.1541	John Bell, O.S.A.	Appointed 4 November 1493; acted as a suffragan bishop in England between 1499 and circa 1530; died circa 1541
1541	c.1559	Eugene MacBrehon, O.Carm.	Appointed 21 November 1541, but cannot have got possession, since the diocese was held by Christopher Bodkin, Archbishop of Tuam; died circa 1559
In circa 1559, the Church of Ireland see was united to the Protestant archbishopric of Tuam

=== Post-Reformation bishops ===
Roman Catholic Bishops of Mayo
From	Until	Incumbent	Notes
c.1559	1574	No bishops appointed	
1574	unknown	Dermot O'Dwyer, O.F.M.	Appointed 12 February 1574; death date unknown
1576	1579	Patrick O'Hely, O.F.M	Appointed 4 July 1576; died (hanged) after June 1579
1579	1585	No bishops appointed	
1585	unknown	Adam Magauran	Appointed 28 July 1585; death date unknown
In 1631, Mayo was united to the Roman Catholic archbishopric of Tuam
