= Guglielmo Bastoni =

17th-century Roman Catholic bishop

Most Reverend Guglielmo Bastoni
- Bishop of Pavia; Apostolic Nuncio to Naples
- Church: Catholic Church
- Diocese: Diocese of Pavia
- In office: 1593–1609
- Predecessor: Francesco Gonzaga
- Successor: Giovanni Battista Biglia

Orders
- Consecration: 6 May 1593 by Michele Bonelli

Personal details
- Born: 5 Dec 1544 Milan, Italy
- Died: Jan 1609 (age 64)

Guglielmo Bastoni (1544–1609) was a Roman Catholic prelate who served as Bishop of Pavia (1593–1609) and Apostolic Nuncio to Naples (1606–1609).

== Biography ==
Guglielmo Bastoni was born on 5 Dec 1544 in Milan, Italy. On 30 Apr 1593, he was appointed during the papacy of Pope Clement VIII as Bishop of Pavia. On 6 May 1593, he was consecrated bishop by Michele Bonelli, Cardinal-Bishop of Albano, with Ludovico de Torres, Archbishop of Monreale, and Owen Lewis, Bishop of Cassano all'Jonio, serving as co-consecrators. On 26 May 1606, he was appointed during the papacy of Pope Paul V as Apostolic Nuncio to Naples. He served as Bishop of Pavia and Apostolic Nuncio to Naples until his death in Jan 1609.

== Episcopal succession ==
While bishop, he was the principal co-consecrator of:

- Sebastiano Ghislieri, Bishop of Strongoli (1601);
- Peter Lombard, Archbishop of Armagh (1601);
- Stefano Spínola, Bishop of Ventimiglia (1602);
- Alessandro Petrucci, Bishop of Massa Marittima (1602);
- Fausto Malari, Bishop of Chiusi (1602);
- Simone Lunadori, Bishop of Nocera de' Pagani (1602);
- Giovanni Giovenale Ancina, Bishop of Nocera de' Pagani (1602);
- Camillo Olario (Aulari, Ozario), Bishop of Bobbio (1602);
- Andrés Fernández de Córdoba y Carvajal, Bishop of Badajoz (1602);
- Pirro Imperoli, Bishop of Jesi (1604).

== External links and additional sources ==
- Cheney, David M. "Diocese of Pavia". Catholic-Hierarchy.org. (for Chronology of Bishops) ^{[self-published]}
- Chow, Gabriel. "Diocese of Pavia". GCatholic.org. (for Chronology of Bishops) ^{[self-published]}
- Cheney, David M. "Nunciature to Naples". Catholic-Hierarchy.org. (for Chronology of Bishops) ^{[self-published]}

Catholic Church titles
| Preceded by Francesco Gonzaga | Bishop of Pavia; 1593–1609 | Succeeded by Giovanni Battista Biglia |
| Preceded by Jacopo Aldobrandini | Apostolic Nuncio to Naples; 1606–1609 | Succeeded by Valeriano Muti |
