= Ponzetti =

Ponzetti is an Italian surname. Notable people with the surname include:

- Ferdinando Ponzetti (1444–1527), Italian Roman Catholic bishop and cardinal
- Giacomo Ponzetti, 16th-century Italian Roman Catholic bishop
