= Innico Siscara =

Most Reverend Innico Siscara
- Bishop of Anglona-Tursi
- Church: Catholic Church
- Diocese: Diocese of Anglona-Tursi
- In office: 1616–1619
- Predecessor: Bernardo Giustiniano
- Successor: Alfonso Giglioli

Orders
- Consecration: 31 December 1616 by Giovanni Garzia Mellini

Personal details
- Died: 1619 Anglona-Tursi, Italy

Innico Siscara (died 1619) was a Roman Catholic prelate who served as Bishop of Anglona-Tursi (1616–1619).

== Biography ==
On 19 December 1616, Innico Siscara was appointed during the papacy of Pope Paul V as Bishop of Anglona-Tursi. On 31 December 1616, he was consecrated bishop by Giovanni Garzia Mellini, Cardinal-Priest of Santi Quattro Coronati with Galeazzo Sanvitale, Archbishop Emeritus of Bari-Canosa, and Alessandro Guidiccioni (iuniore), Bishop of Lucca, serving as co-consecrators. He served as Bishop of Anglona-Tursi until his death in 1619.

== Episcopal succession ==
While bishop, he was the principal co-consecrator of.

- Giovanni Dominico Giaconi, Bishop of Guardialfiera (1617);
- Nicolò Spínola, Bishop of Ventimiglia (1617);
- Stephanus Penulatius, Bishop of Rethymo (1617);
- Marcello Pignatelli, Bishop of Jesi (1617); and
- Girolamo de Franchis, Bishop of Nardò (1617).

== External links and additional sources ==
- Cheney, David M. "Diocese of Tursi-Lagonegro". Catholic-Hierarchy.org. (for Chronology of Bishops) ^{[self-published]}
- Chow, Gabriel. "Diocese of Tursi-Lagonegro (Italy)". GCatholic.org. (for Chronology of Bishops) ^{[self-published]}

Catholic Church titles
Preceded by Bernardo Giustiniano	Bishop of Anglona-Tursi; 1616–1619	Succeeded by Alfonso Giglioli
