= Rinaldo Corso =

Most Reverend Rinaldo Corso
- Bishop of Strongoli
- Church: Catholic Church
- Diocese: Diocese of Strongoli
- In office: 1579–1582
- Predecessor: Gregorio Forbicini
- Successor: Domenico Petrucci

Personal details
- Died: 1582 Strongoli, Italy

Rinaldo Corso (died 1582) was a Roman Catholic prelate who served as Bishop of Strongoli (1579–1582).

== Biography ==
On 3 August 1579, Rinaldo Corso was appointed by Pope Gregory XIII as Bishop of Strongoli. He served as Bishop of Strongoli until his death in 1582.

== See also ==
- Catholic Church in Italy

== External links and additional sources ==
- Cheney, David M. "Diocese of Strongoli". Catholic-Hierarchy.org. (for Chronology of Bishops) ^{[self-published]}
- Chow, Gabriel. "Titular Episcopal See of Strongoli (Italy)". GCatholic.org. (for Chronology of Bishops) ^{[self-published]}

Catholic Church titles
Preceded by Gregorio Forbicini	Bishop of Strongoli; 1579–1582	Succeeded by Domenico Petrucci
