= Carlo Diotallevi =

Bishop of Strongoli (1639–1652)

Most Reverend Carlo Diotallevi
- Bishop of Strongoli
- Church: Catholic Church
- In office: 1639–1652
- Predecessor: Giulio Diotallevi
- Successor: Martino Denti de' Cipriani

Orders
- Consecration: 22 May 1639 by Alessandro Cesarini (iuniore)

Personal details
- Born: 1607 Rimini, Italy
- Died: March 1652 (aged 44–45) Strongoli, Italy

Carlo Diotallevi (1607 – March 1652) was a Roman Catholic prelate who served as Bishop of Strongoli (1639–1652).

== Biography ==
Carlo Diotallevi was born in Rimini, Italy. On 2 May 1639, he was appointed during the papacy of Pope Urban VIII as Bishop of Strongoli. On 22 May 1639, he was consecrated bishop by Alessandro Cesarini (iuniore), Cardinal-Deacon of Sant'Eustachio, with Lelio Falconieri, Titular Archbishop of Thebae, and Giovanni Battista Altieri, Bishop Emeritus of Camerino, serving as co-consecrators. He served as Bishop of Strongoli until his death in March 1652.

== External links and additional sources ==
- Cheney, David M. "Diocese of Strongoli". Catholic-Hierarchy.org. (for Chronology of Bishops) ^{[self-published]}
- Chow, Gabriel. "Titular Episcopal See of Strongoli (Italy)". GCatholic.org. (for Chronology of Bishops) ^{[self-published]}

Catholic Church titles
Preceded by Giulio Diotallevi	Bishop of Strongoli; 1639–1652	Succeeded by Martino Denti de' Cipriani
