= Martino Denti de' Cipriani =

Roman Catholic bishop

Most Reverend Martino Denti de' Cipriani
- Bishop of Strongoli
- Church: Catholic Church
- Diocese: Diocese of Strongoli
- In office: 1652–1655
- Predecessor: Carlo Diotallevi
- Successor: Biagio Mazzella

Orders
- Consecration: 29 September 1652 by Marcantonio Franciotti

Personal details
- Died: 1655 Strongoli, Italy

Martino Denti de' Cipriani, B. (died 1655) was a Roman Catholic prelate, who served as Bishop of Strongoli (1652–1655).

== Biography ==
Martino Denti de' Cipriani was ordained a priest in the Clerics Regular of Saint Paul. On 26 August 1652, he was appointed during the papacy of Pope Innocent X as Bishop of Strongoli. On 29 September 1652, he was consecrated bishop by Marcantonio Franciotti, Cardinal-Priest of Santa Maria della Pace, with Giovan Battista Foppa, Archbishop of Benevento, and Ranuccio Scotti Douglas, Bishop Emeritus of Borgo San Donnino, serving as co-consecrators. He served as Bishop of Strongoli until his death in 1655.

== External links and additional sources ==
- Cheney, David M. "Diocese of Strongoli". Catholic-Hierarchy.org. (for Chronology of Bishops) ^{[self-published]}
- Chow, Gabriel. "Titular Episcopal See of Strongoli (Italy)". GCatholic.org. (for Chronology of Bishops) ^{[self-published]}

Catholic Church titles
| Preceded by Carlo Diotallevi | Bishop of Strongoli; 1652–1655 | Succeeded by Biagio Mazzella |
