= Giulio Diotallevi =

Italian Roman Catholic prelate

Most Reverend Giulio Diotallevi
- Bishop of Strongoli
- Church: Catholic Church
- Diocese: Diocese of Strongoli
- In office: 1637–1638
- Predecessor: Sallustio Bartoli
- Successor: Carlo Diotallevi

Orders
- Consecration: 20 Decem 1637 by Alessandro Cesarini (iuniore)

Personal details
- Born: 1602 Rimini, Italy
- Died: September 1638 (age 36) Strongoli, Italy

Giulio Diotallevi (1602 – September 1638) was a Roman Catholic prelate who served as Bishop of Strongoli (1637–1638).

== Biography ==
Giulio Diotallevi was born in Rimini, Italy in 1602. On 14 December 1637, he was appointed during the papacy of Pope Urban VIII as Bishop of Strongoli. On 20 December 1637, he was consecrated bishop by Alessandro Cesarini (iuniore), Bishop of Viterbo e Tuscania, with Angelo Cesi, Bishop of Rimini, and Giovanni Battista Scanaroli, Titular Bishop of Sidon, serving as co-consecrators. He served as Bishop of Strongoli until his death in September 1638.

== External links and additional sources ==
- Cheney, David M. "Diocese of Strongoli". Catholic-Hierarchy.org. (for Chronology of Bishops) ^{[self-published]}
- Chow, Gabriel. "Titular Episcopal See of Strongoli (Italy)". GCatholic.org. (for Chronology of Bishops) ^{[self-published]}

Catholic Church titles
Preceded by Sallustio Bartoli	Bishop of Strongoli; 1637–1638	Succeeded by Carlo Diotallevi
