= Gaspare de Murgiis =

Most Reverend Gaspare de Murgiis
- Bishop of Strongoli
- Church: Catholic Church
- Diocese: Diocese of Strongoli
- In office: 1509–1534
- Predecessor: Girolamo Lusco
- Successor: Girolamo Grimaldi

Personal details
- Died: 1534 Strongoli, Italy

Gaspare de Murgiis (died 1524) was a Roman Catholic prelate who served as Bishop of Strongoli (1509–1534).

== Biography ==
On 21 Nov 1509, Gaspare de Murgiis was appointed by Pope Julius II as Bishop of Strongoli. He served as Bishop of Strongoli until his death in 1534.

== External links and additional sources ==
- Cheney, David M. "Diocese of Strongoli". Catholic-Hierarchy.org. (for Chronology of Bishops) ^{[self-published]}
- Chow, Gabriel. "Titular Episcopal See of Strongoli (Italy)". GCatholic.org. (for Chronology of Bishops) ^{[self-published]}

Catholic Church titles
Preceded by Girolamo Lusco	Bishop of Strongoli; 1509–1534	Succeeded by Girolamo Grimaldi
