= Marcello Pignatelli =

17th-century Italian Catholic bishop

Most Reverend Marcello Pignatelli
- Bishop of Jesi
- Church: Catholic Church
- Diocese: Diocese of Iesi
- In office: 1617–1621
- Predecessor: Pirro Imperoli
- Successor: Tiberio Cenci

Orders
- Consecration: 26 November 1617 by Ladislao d'Aquino

Personal details
- Born: 1567 Rome, Italy
- Died: 1621 (age 54) Jesi, Italy

Marcello Pignatelli, C.R. (1567–1621) was a Roman Catholic prelate who served as Bishop of Jesi (1617–1621).

== Biography ==
Marcello Pignatelli was born in Rome, Italy in 1567 and ordained a priest in the Congregation of Clerics Regular of the Divine Providence. On 13 November 1617, he was appointed during the papacy of Pope Paul V as Bishop of Jesi. On 26 November 1617, he was consecrated bishop by Ladislao d'Aquino, Bishop of Venafro, with Antonio d'Aquino, Bishop of Sarno, and Innico Siscara, Bishop of Anglona-Tursi, serving as co-consecrators. He served as Bishop of Jesi until his death in 1621.

== External links and additional sources ==
- Cheney, David M. "Diocese of Iesi". Catholic-Hierarchy.org. (for Chronology of Bishops) ^{[self-published]}
- Chow, Gabriel. "Diocese of Jesi (Italy)". GCatholic.org. (for Chronology of Bishops) ^{[self-published]}

Catholic Church titles
Preceded by Pirro Imperoli	Bishop of Jesi; 1617–1621	Succeeded by Tiberio Cenci
