= Claudio Vico =

16th-century Roman Catholic prelate

Most Reverend Claudio Vico
- Bishop of Strongoli
- Church: Catholic Church
- Diocese: Diocese of Strongoli
- In office: 1590–1599
- Predecessor: Claudio Marescotti
- Successor: Marcello Lorenzi

Personal details
- Died: 1599 Strongoli, Italy

Claudio Vico (died 1599) was a Roman Catholic prelate who served as Bishop of Strongoli (1590–1599).

== Biography ==
On 21 Mar 1590, Claudio Vico was appointed by Pope Gregory XIII as Bishop of Strongoli. He served as Bishop of Strongoli until his death in 1599.

== External links and additional sources ==
- Cheney, David M. "Diocese of Strongoli". Catholic-Hierarchy.org. (for Chronology of Bishops) ^{[self-published]}
- Chow, Gabriel. "Titular Episcopal See of Strongoli (Italy)". GCatholic.org. (for Chronology of Bishops) ^{[self-published]}

Catholic Church titles
Preceded by Claudio Marescotti	Bishop of Strongoli; 1590–1599	Succeeded by Marcello Lorenzi
