= Girolamo Zacconi =

Most Reverend Girolamo Zacconi
- Bishop of Strongoli
- Church: Catholic Church
- Diocese: Diocese of Strongoli
- In office: 1541–1558
- Predecessor: Pietro Ranieri
- Successor: Matteo Zacconi

Personal details
- Died: 1558 Strongoli, Italy

Girolamo Zacconi (died 1558) was a Roman Catholic prelate who served as Bishop of Strongoli (1541–1558).

== Biography ==
On 20 May 1541, Girolamo Zacconi was appointed by Pope Paul III as Bishop of Strongoli. He served as Bishop of Strongoli until his resignation in 1558.

== See also ==
- Catholic Church in Italy

== External links and additional sources ==
- Cheney, David M. "Diocese of Strongoli". Catholic-Hierarchy.org. (for Chronology of Bishops) ^{[self-published]}
- Chow, Gabriel. "Titular Episcopal See of Strongoli (Italy)". GCatholic.org. (for Chronology of Bishops) ^{[self-published]}

Catholic Church titles
Preceded by Pietro Ranieri	Bishop of Strongoli; 1541–1558	Succeeded by Matteo Zacconi
