= Pirro Imperoli =

Roman Catholic prelate

Most Reverend Pirro Imperoli
- Bishop of Jesi
- Church: Catholic Church
- Diocese: Diocese of Jesi
- In office: 1604–1617
- Predecessor: Marco Agrippa Dandini
- Successor: Marcello Pignatelli

Orders
- Consecration: 8 February 1604 by Camillo Borghese

Personal details
- Born: 1554 Verulan, Italy
- Died: 1617 (age 63) Jesi, Italy

Pirro Imperoli (1554–1617) was a Roman Catholic prelate who served as Bishop of Jesi (1604–1617).

== Biography ==
Pirro Imperoli was born in Verulan, Italy in 1554. On 28 January 1604, he was appointed during the papacy of Pope Clement VIII as Bishop of Jesi. On 8 February 1604, he was consecrated bishop by Camillo Borghese, Cardinal-Priest of San Crisogono, with Guglielmo Bastoni, Bishop of Pavia, and Sebastiano Ghislieri, Bishop of Strongoli, serving as co-consecrators. He served as Bishop of Jesi until his death in 1617.

== External links and additional sources ==
- Cheney, David M. "Diocese of Iesi". Catholic-Hierarchy.org. (for Chronology of Bishops) ^{[self-published]}
- Chow, Gabriel. "Diocese of Jesi (Italy)". GCatholic.org. (for Chronology of Bishops) ^{[self-published]}

Catholic Church titles
Preceded by Marco Agrippa Dandini	Bishop of Jesi; 1604–1617	Succeeded by Marcello Pignatelli
