= Bernardino Piccoli =

Italian Catholic archbishop

Most Reverend Bernardino Piccoli
- Bishop of Strongoli
- Church: Catholic Church
- Diocese: Diocese of Strongoli
- In office: 1627–1636
- Predecessor: Sebastiano Ghislieri
- Successor: Sallustio Bartoli

Orders
- Consecration: 2 January 1622 by Fabrizio Verallo

Personal details
- Born: 1581 Umbriatico, Italy
- Died: 1636 (age 55) Strongoli, Italy

Bernardino Piccoli (1581–1636) was a Roman Catholic prelate who served as Bishop of Strongoli (1627–1636) and Titular Archbishop of Nicaea (1622–1627).

== Biography ==
Bernardino Piccoli was born in Umbriatico, Italy, in 1581. On 15 December 1621, he was appointed during the papacy of Pope Urban VIII as Titular Archbishop of Nicaea and Coadjutor Bishop of Strongoli. On 2 January 1622, he was consecrated bishop by Fabrizio Verallo, Cardinal-Priest of Sant'Agostino, with Muzio Cinquini, Bishop of Avellino e Frigento, and Girolamo Ricciulli, Bishop of Belcastro, serving as co-consecrators. On 2 October 1627, he succeeded to the bishopric of Strongoli. He served as Bishop of Strongoli until his death in 1636.

== External links and additional sources ==
- Cheney, David M. "Nicaea (Titular See)". Catholic-Hierarchy.org. (for Chronology of Bishops) ^{[self-published]}
- Chow, Gabriel. "Titular Metropolitan See of Nicæa (Turkey)". GCatholic.org. (for Chronology of Bishops) ^{[self-published]}
- Cheney, David M. "Diocese of Strongoli". Catholic-Hierarchy.org. (for Chronology of Bishops) ^{[self-published]}
- Chow, Gabriel. "Titular Episcopal See of Strongoli (Italy)". GCatholic.org. (for Chronology of Bishops) ^{[self-published]}

Catholic Church titles
Preceded by	Titular Archbishop of Nicaea; 1622–1627	Succeeded by Diego Secco
Preceded by Sebastiano Ghislieri	Bishop of Strongoli; 1627–1636	Succeeded by Sallustio Bartoli
