= Niutta family =

Albanian noble family

Bruni
- Noble family
- Coat of Arms of the Niutta family
- Origin: Albania

The Niutta family was an old and influential Italian noble family of Albanian origin, holding the titles of Duke and Marquis of Marescotti.

== History ==
The family emigrated from Albania in the 14th century together with other noble families as the Ottoman Empire expanded across the Balkans and transplanted to Calabria. They resided in Potenza, Basilicata region, as well as Naples in Campania, regions of Southern Italy. The family was awarded the title of Duke since 1722 and held the title of Marquis of Marescotti since 1719.

== Notable members ==
- Vincenzo Niutta - magistrate and jurist, senator and minister of the Kingdom of Italy.
- Giovanni Niutta - Duke, Marquis of Marescotti and Mayor of Naples from 23 January 1934 to 10 July 1936, awarded the Order of the Crown of Italy as well as the Order of Saints Maurice and Lazarus .
- Ugo Niutta - Italian WW1 aviator and officer, decorated with the Italian Gold Medal of Military Valor.
