= Matteo Zacconi =

Italian Roman Catholic prelate (died 1565)

Most Reverend Matteo Zacconi
- Bishop of Strongoli
- Church: Catholic Church
- Diocese: Diocese of Strongoli
- In office: 1558–1565
- Predecessor: Girolamo Zacconi
- Successor: Tommaso Orsini

Personal details
- Died: 1565 Strongoli, Italy

Matteo Zacconi (died 1565) was a Roman Catholic prelate who served as Bishop of Strongoli (1558–1565).

== Biography ==
On 15 June 1558, Matteo Zacconi was appointed by Pope Paul IV as Bishop of Strongoli. He served as Bishop of Strongoli until his death in 1565.

== See also ==
- Catholic Church in Italy

== External links and additional sources ==
- Cheney, David M. "Diocese of Strongoli". Catholic-Hierarchy.org. (for Chronology of Bishops) ^{[self-published]}
- Chow, Gabriel. "Titular Episcopal See of Strongoli (Italy)". GCatholic.org. (for Chronology of Bishops) ^{[self-published]}

Catholic Church titles
Preceded by Girolamo Zacconi	Bishop of Strongoli; 1558–1565	Succeeded by Tommaso Orsini
