= Girolamo Lusco =

Most Reverend Girolamo Lusco
- Bishop of Strongoli
- Church: Catholic Church
- Diocese: Diocese of Strongoli
- In office: 1496–1509
- Successor: Gaspare de Murgiis

Personal details
- Died: 1509 Strongoli, Italy

Girolamo Lusco (died 1509) was a Roman Catholic prelate who served as Bishop of Strongoli (1496–1509).

== Biography ==
On 2 Dec 1496, Girolamo Lusco was appointed by Pope Alexander VI as Bishop of Strongoli. He served as Bishop of Strongoli until his death in 1509.

== External links and additional sources ==
- Cheney, David M. "Diocese of Strongoli". Catholic-Hierarchy.org. (for Chronology of Bishops) ^{[self-published]}
- Chow, Gabriel. "Titular Episcopal See of Strongoli (Italy)". GCatholic.org. (for Chronology of Bishops) ^{[self-published]}

Catholic Church titles
Preceded by	Bishop of Strongoli; 1496–1509	Succeeded by Gaspare de Murgiis
