= Marescotti =

Marescotti is a surname. Notable people with the surname include:

- Bartolomeo Marescotti (c. 1590–1630), Italian painter
- Claudio Marescotti (1520–1590), Italian Roman Catholic bishop
- Galeazzo Marescotti (1627–1726), Italian Roman Catholic cardinal
- Giovanni Luigi Marescotti (died 1587), Italian Roman Catholic bishop
- Ivano Marescotti (1946–2023), Italian actor
- Luigi Aldrovandi Marescotti (1876–1945), Italian politician and diplomat
- Marco Antonio Marescotti (died 1681), Italian Roman Catholic bishop
- Pietro Abbati Marescotti (1768–1842), Italian mathematician
