= Sebastiano Ghislieri =

Catholic bishop

Most Reverend Sebastiano Ghislieri
- Bishop of Strongoli
- Church: Catholic Church
- Diocese: Diocese of Strongoli
- In office: 1601–1627
- Predecessor: Marcello Lorenzi
- Successor: Bernardino Piccoli

Orders
- Consecration: 13 May 1601 by Camillo Borghese

Personal details
- Died: 2 October 1627

Sebastiano Ghislieri (died 2 October 1627) was a Roman Catholic prelate who served as Bishop of Strongoli (1601–1627).

== Biography ==
On 30 April 1601, Sebastiano Ghislieri was appointed during the papacy of Pope Clement VIII as Bishop of Strongoli. On 13 May 1601, he was consecrated bishop by Camillo Borghese, Cardinal-Priest of Santi Giovanni e Paolo, with Alfonso Pisani, Archbishop of Santa Severina, and Guglielmo Bastoni, Bishop of Pavia, serving as co-consecrators. He served as Bishop of Strongoli until his death on 2 October 1627.

While bishop, he was the principal co-consecrator of Pirro Imperoli, Bishop of Jesi (1604).

== External links and additional sources ==
- Cheney, David M. "Diocese of Strongoli". Catholic-Hierarchy.org. (for Chronology of Bishops) ^{[self-published]}
- Chow, Gabriel. "Titular Episcopal See of Strongoli (Italy)". GCatholic.org. (for Chronology of Bishops) ^{[self-published]}

Catholic Church titles
Preceded by Marcello Lorenzi	Bishop of Strongoli; 1601–1627	Succeeded by Bernardino Piccoli
