= Gregorio Forbicini =

Roman catholic prelate

The Most Reverend Gregorio Forbicini
- Bishop of Strongoli
- Church: Catholic Church
- Diocese: Diocese of Strongoli
- In office: 1572–1579
- Predecessor: Timoteo Giustiniani
- Successor: Rinaldo Corso

Orders
- Consecration: 27 January 1572 by Giulio Antonio Santorio

Personal details
- Died: 1579 Strongoli, Italy

Gregorio Forbicini (died 1579) was a Roman Catholic prelate who served as Bishop of Strongoli (1572–1579).

== Biography ==
On 23 January 1572, Gregorio Forbicini was appointed during the papacy of Pope Pius V as Bishop of Strongoli. On 27 January 1572, he was consecrated bishop by Giulio Antonio Santorio, Archbishop of Santa Severina, with Thomas Goldwell, Bishop of Saint Asaph, and Giuseppe Pamphilj, Bishop of Segni, serving as co-consecrators. He served as Bishop of Strongoli until his death in 1579.

== See also ==
- Catholic Church in Italy

== External links and additional sources ==
- Cheney, David M. "Diocese of Strongoli". Catholic-Hierarchy.org. (for Chronology of Bishops) ^{[self-published]}
- Chow, Gabriel. "Titular Episcopal See of Strongoli (Italy)". GCatholic.org. (for Chronology of Bishops) ^{[self-published]}

Catholic Church titles
Preceded by Timoteo Giustiniani	Bishop of Strongoli; 1572–1579	Succeeded by Rinaldo Corso
