= Valeriano Muti =

Italian Roman Catholic bishop (died 1610)

Most Reverend Valeriano Muti
- Bishop of Città di Castello
- Church: Catholic Church
- Diocese: Diocese of Città di Castello
- In office: 1602–1610
- Predecessor: Ludovico Bentivoglio
- Successor: Luca Semproni
- Previous posts: Bishop of Bitetto (1599–1602); Apostolic Nuncio to Naples (1609–1610)

Orders
- Consecration: 18 July 1599 by Camillo Borghese

Personal details
- Died: 19 March 1610 Città di Castello, Italy

Valeriano Muti (died 19 March 1610) was a Roman Catholic prelate who served as Bishop of Città di Castello (1602–1610), Apostolic Nuncio to Naples (1609–1610), and Bishop of Bitetto (1599–1602).

== Biography ==
On 5 July 1599, Valeriano Muti was appointed during the papacy of Pope Clement VIII as Bishop of Bitetto. On 18 July 1599, he was consecrated bishop by Camillo Borghese, Cardinal-Priest of Santi Giovanni e Paolo, with Giovanni Camerota, Bishop of Bova, and Leonardus Roselli, Bishop of Vulturara e Montecorvino, serving as co-consecrators. On 15 November 1602, he was appointed during the papacy of Pope Clement VIII as Bishop of Città di Castello. On 12 January 1609, he was appointed during the papacy of Pope Paul V as Apostolic Nuncio to Naples. He served as Bishop of Città di Castello until his death on 19 March 1610.

== Episcopal succession ==
While bishop, he was the principal co-consecrator of:

- Marco Agrippa Dandini, Bishop of Jesi (1599);
- Placido Fava, Bishop of Castro di Puglia (1600);
- Simone Lunadori, Bishop of Nocera de' Pagani (1602);
- Giovanni Garzia Mellini, Titular Archbishop of Colossae (1605);
- Filippo Filonardi, Bishop of Aquino (1608); and
- Domenico Rivarola, Bishop of Aleria (1608).

== External links and additional sources ==
- Cheney, David M. "Diocese of Bitetto". Catholic-Hierarchy.org. (for Chronology of Bishops) ^{[self-published]}
- Chow, Gabriel. "Titular Episcopal See of Bitetto" (Italy)". GCatholic.org. (for Chronology of Bishops) ^{[self-published]}
- Cheney, David M. "Nunciature to Naples". Catholic-Hierarchy.org. (for Chronology of Bishops) ^{[self-published]}
- Cheney, David M. "Diocese of Città di Castello". Catholic-Hierarchy.org. (for Chronology of Bishops) ^{[self-published]}
- Chow, Gabriel. "Diocese of Città di Castello". GCatholic.org. (for Chronology of Bishops) ^{[self-published]}

Catholic Church titles
Preceded by Giovanni Salviati	Bishop of Bitetto; 1599–1602	Succeeded by Baldassarre Pusterla
Preceded by Guglielmo Bastoni	Apostolic Nuncio to Naples; 1609–1610	Succeeded by Diodato Gentile
Preceded by Ludovico Bentivoglio	Bishop of Città di Castello; 1602–1610	Succeeded by Luca Semproni
