= Tommaso Olivieri =

Most Reverend Tommaso Olivieri
- Bishop of Strongoli
- Church: Catholic Church
- Diocese: Diocese of Strongoli
- In office: 1706–1719
- Predecessor: Giovanni Battista Carrone
- Successor: Domenico de Marzano

Personal details
- Born: 1660 Cutro, Italy
- Died: February 1719 (aged 58–59) Strongoli, Italy

Tommaso Olivieri (1660 – February 1719) was a Roman Catholic prelate who served as Bishop of Strongoli (1706–1719).

== Biography ==
Tommaso Olivieri was born in Cutro, Italy. On 25 Jun 1706, he was appointed by Pope Clement XI as Bishop of Strongoli. He served as Bishop of Strongoli until his death in February 1719.

== External links and additional sources ==
- Cheney, David M. "Diocese of Strongoli". Catholic-Hierarchy.org. (for Chronology of Bishops) ^{[self-published]}
- Chow, Gabriel. "Titular Episcopal See of Strongoli (Italy)". GCatholic.org. (for Chronology of Bishops) ^{[self-published]}

Catholic Church titles
Preceded by Giovanni Battista Carrone	Bishop of Strongoli; 1706–1719	Succeeded by Domenico de Marzano
