= Clemente d'Olera =

Italian cardinal and bishop

His Eminence Clemente d'Olera O.F.M.
- Bishop of Foligno
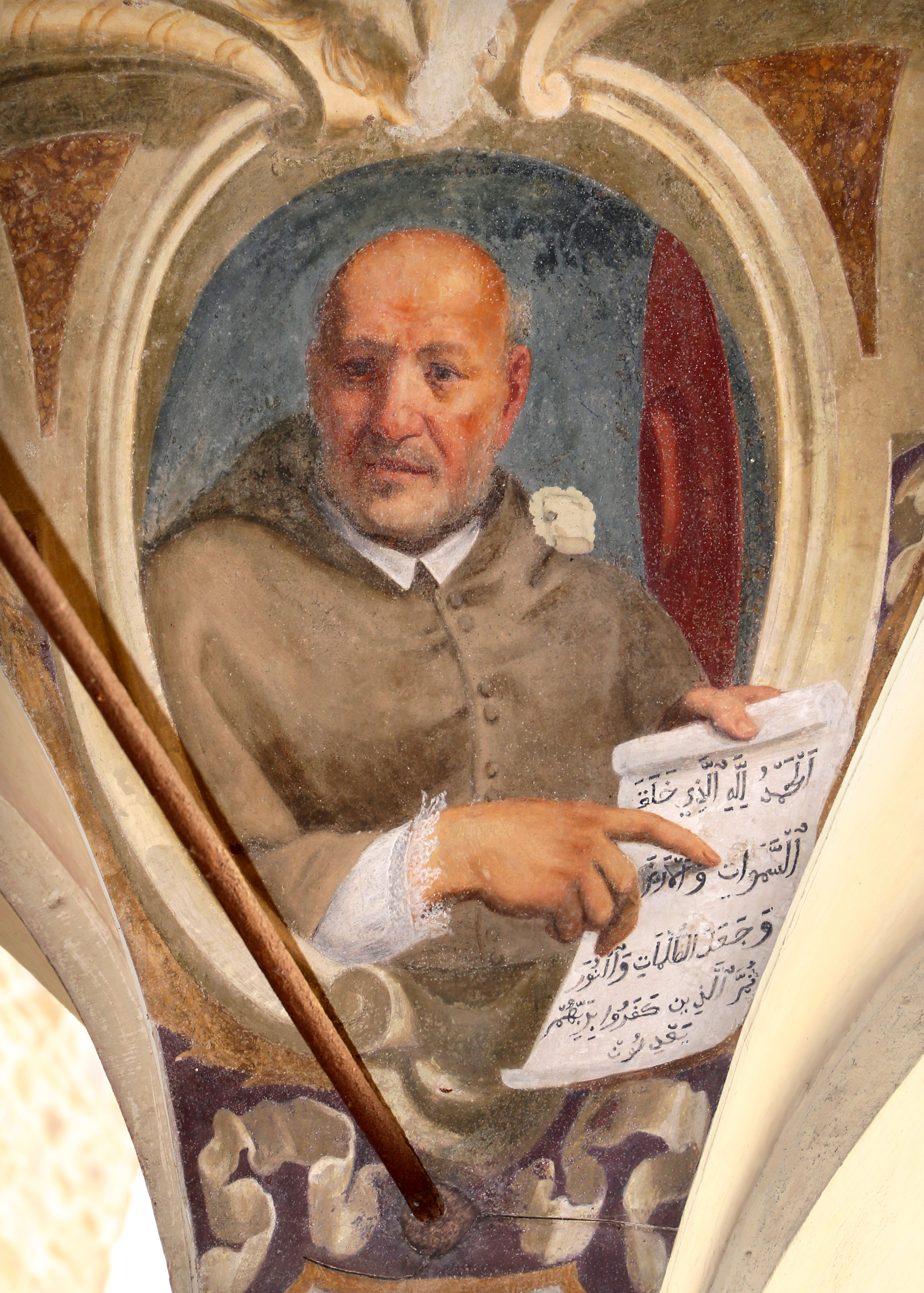
- Church: Catholic Church
- Diocese: Foligno
- Appointed: 13 March 1560
- Term ended: 6 January 1568
- Predecessor: Giovanni Antonio Serbelloni
- Successor: Tommaso Orsini
- Other posts: Cardinal-Priest of Santa Maria in Ara Coeli (1557-1568)

Orders
- Created cardinal: 15 March 1557 by Pope Paul IV
- Rank: Cardinal-Priest

Personal details
- Born: 20 June 1501 Moneglia, Republic of Genoa
- Died: 6 January 1568 (aged 66) Rome, Papal States
- Buried: Santa Maria in Ara Coeli

Clemente d'Olera (20 June 1501 – 6 January 1568) was an Italian Roman Catholic who became Minister General of the Order of Friars Minor, cardinal and bishop.

== Biography ==
Clemente d'Olera was born in the Castle of Moneglia on 20 June 1501. He joined the Order of Friars Minor Observants at a young age, spending his youth in the service of the Franciscans. He then moved to Bologna to study Christian theology. He then spent several years studying philosophy and theology in the religious houses of his order.

In 1538, he was elected provincial superior of his order for Bologna, then he became definitor and procurator in Mantua in 1541. He became the order's minister general in Corsica in 1545, with Giovanni Maltei da Calvi as his vicar general. He succeeded Maltei in that office after Maltei's death in 1547, with the permission of Pope Paul III. Also in 1547, at the general chapter of the order held in Assisi, he became prefect of the Franciscan Famiglia Cismontana. At the general chapter held in Bologna in 1550, he was elected commissary of the curia. At the 1553 general chapter held in Salamanca, he was elected Ministers General of the Order of Friars Minor. As minister general, he promulgated the Constitutiones Salmanticenses in 1554. On 1 January 1555 Pope Julius III named him his commissary against heresy for anywhere he traveled except Spain.

Pope Paul IV made him a cardinal priest in the consistory of 15 March 1557. He received the red hat and the titular church of Santa Maria in Aracoeli on 24 March 1557. He became Archpriest of Rapallo in 1558. The pope also made him prefect of the Holy Office. He participated in the papal conclave of 1559 that elected Pope Pius IV.

On 13 March 1560 he was elected Bishop of Foligno. He set up a printing press in the episcopal palace to publish works defending the faith.

He participated in the papal conclave of 1565-66 that elected Pope Pius V. He continued to serve in the Holy Office and became the cardinal protector of the Holy Roman Empire.

He died in the Franciscan convent of San Pietro in Montorio after a long illness on 6 January 1568. He was buried in his titular church. He left his wealth to the infirm of the hospital of San Giacomo degli Incurabili.
