= Septimius of Iesi =

Bishop and martyr

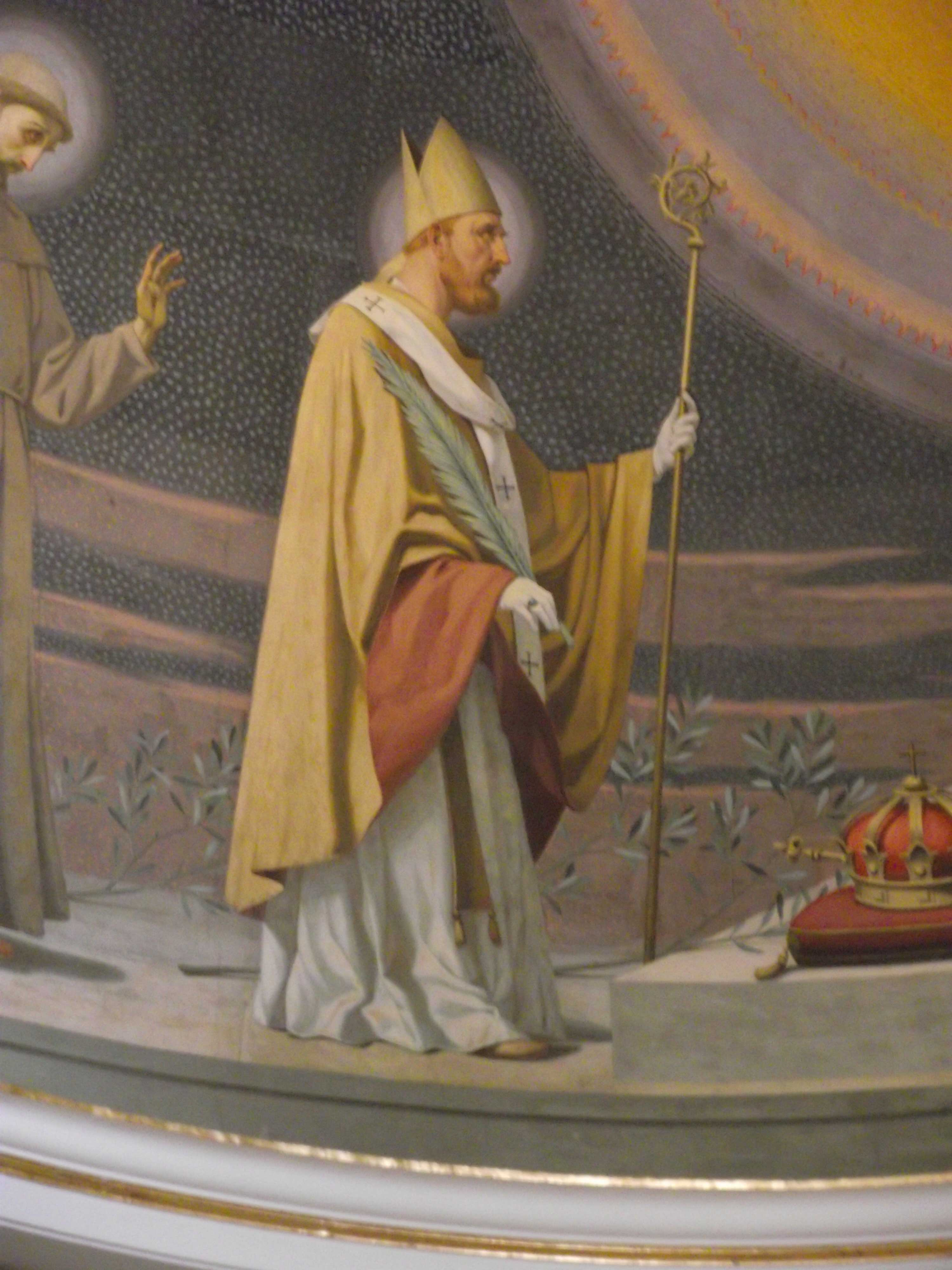
- Fresco of St. Septimius, by Biagio Bigatti, 1937, in Iesi Cathedral

Martyr
- Born: Germania
- Died: 307 AD
- Venerated in: Roman Catholic Church; Eastern Orthodox Church
- Major shrine: Iesi
- Feast: September 22
- Attributes: Episcopal attire
- Patronage: Iesi

Saint Septimius of Iesi (Italian: Settimio di Jesi) (d. 307) was the first Bishop of Iesi, a martyr, and a saint.

Septimius was born in what is now Germany, and after an education in the liberal arts, began a military career. After he converted to Christianity, he parted with his family, who did not convert, and went to Italy where he worked as a minister in Milan. He was forced out of Milan during the Diocletianic Persecution in 303. He later made his way to Rome, where the miracles he performed impressed Pope Marcellus I so much that he ordained Septimius as Bishop of Iesi.

Septimius established Iesi Cathedral. A local magistrate, Florentius, opposed the dedication of the cathedral after Septimius refused to make a sacrifice to the pagan gods. Florentius subsequently ordered Septimius to be decapitated.

The body of Septimius was exhumed in 1469, although the cult of Septimius dated from much earlier. A new altar was consecrated to the saint at the cathedral in 1623.

Septimius is the patron saint of Iesi. His feast day was on September 5 until 1623, when it was changed to September 22.

== Sources ==
- Santi e Beati: San Settimio de Jesi (in Italian)
