= Alessandro Petrucci =

Italian Catholic bishop (died 1628)

Most Reverend Alessandro Petrucci
- Archbishop of Siena
- Church: Catholic Church
- Archdiocese: Archdiocese of Siena
- In office: 1615–1628
- Predecessor: Metello Bichi
- Successor: Ascanio II Piccolomini

Orders
- Consecration: 5 May 1602 by Camillo Borghese

Personal details
- Died: 7 June 1628 Siena, Italy

Alessandro Petrucci (died 7 June 1628) was a Roman Catholic prelate who served as Archbishop of Siena (1615–1628) and Bishop of Massa Marittima (1602–1615).

== Biography ==
On 22 April 1602, Alessandro Petrucci was appointed during the papacy of Pope Clement VIII as Bishop of Massa Marittima. On 5 May 1602, he was consecrated bishop by Camillo Borghese, Cardinal-Priest of San Crisogono, with Guglielmo Bastoni, Bishop of Pavia, and Horace Capponi, Bishop of Carpentras, serving as co-consecrators. On 23 March 1615, he was appointed during the papacy of Pope Paul V as Archbishop of Siena. He served as Archbishop of Siena until his death on 7 June 1628.

== External links and additional sources ==
- Cheney, David M. "Diocese of Massa Marittima-Piombino". Catholic-Hierarchy.org. (for Chronology of Bishops) ^{[self-published]}
- Chow, Gabriel. "Diocese of Massa Marittima-Piombino (Italy)". GCatholic.org. (for Chronology of Bishops) ^{[self-published]}
- Cheney, David M. "Archdiocese of Siena-Colle di Val d'Elsa-Montalcino". Catholic-Hierarchy.org. (for Chronology of Bishops) ^{[self-published]}
- Chow, Gabriel. "Metropolitan Archdiocese of Siena–Colle di Val d'Elsa–Montalcino (Italy)". GCatholic.org. (for Chronology of Bishops) ^{[self-published]}

Catholic Church titles
Preceded by Achille Sergardi	Bishop of Massa Marittima; 1602–1615	Succeeded by Fabio Piccolomini
Preceded by Metello Bichi	Archbishop of Siena; 1615–1628	Succeeded by Ascanio II Piccolomini
