= Nicola Balistari =

15th-century Roman Catholic bishop

Most Reverend Nicola Balistari
- Bishop of Strongoli
- Church: Catholic Church
- Diocese: Diocese of Strongoli
- In office: 1470–1479
- Predecessor: Domenico Rossi (bishop)
- Successor: Giovanni di Castello

Personal details
- Died: 1479

Nicola Balistari (died 1479) was a Roman Catholic prelate who served as Bishop of Strongoli (1470–1479).

== Biography ==
On 11 Mar 1470, Nicola Balistari was appointed during the papacy of Pope Paul II as Bishop of Strongoli. He served as Bishop of Strongoli until his death in 1479.

== External links and additional sources ==
- Cheney, David M. "Diocese of Strongoli". Catholic-Hierarchy.org. (for Chronology of Bishops) ^{[self-published]}
- Chow, Gabriel. "Titular Episcopal See of Strongoli (Italy)". GCatholic.org. (for Chronology of Bishops) ^{[self-published]}

Catholic Church titles
Preceded by Domenico Rossi (bishop)	Bishop of Strongoli; 1470–1479	Succeeded by Giovanni di Castello
