= Marco Agrippa Dandini =

Italian Catholic bishop (1558–1603)

Most Reverend Marco Agrippa Dandini
- Bishop of Jesi
- Church: Catholic Church
- Diocese: Diocese of Jesi
- In office: 1599–1603
- Predecessor: Camillo Borghese
- Successor: Pirro Imperoli

Orders
- Ordination: 1756 by Pope Benedict XIV
- Consecration: 22 August 1599 by Camillo Borghese

Personal details
- Born: 1558
- Died: 20 October 1603 (age 45) Jesi, Italy

Marco Agrippa Dandini (1558 – 20 October 1603) was a Roman Catholic prelate who served as Bishop of Jesi (1599–1603).

== Biography ==
Marco Agrippa Dandini was born in 1558. On 2 August 1599, he was appointed Bishop of Jesi by Pope Clement VIII. On 22 August 1599, he was consecrated bishop by Camillo Borghese, Cardinal-Priest of Santi Giovanni e Paolo, with Giovanni Camerota, Bishop of Bova, and Valeriano Muti, Bishop of Bitetto, serving as co-consecrators. He served as Bishop of Jesi until his death on 20 October 1603.

== External links and additional sources ==
Catholic Church titles
Preceded by Camillo Borghese	Bishop of Jesi; 1599–1603	Succeeded by Pirro Imperoli
