= Pietro Ranieri =

Roman Catholic prelate

Most Reverend Pietro Ranieri
- Bishop of Strongoli
- Church: Catholic Church
- Diocese: Diocese of Strongoli
- In office: 1535–1541
- Predecessor: Girolamo Grimaldi
- Successor: Girolamo Zacconi

Orders
- Consecration: 7 December 1535 by Giovanni De Rosa

Pietro Ranieri was a Roman Catholic prelate who served as Bishop of Strongoli (1535–1541).

== Biography ==
On 15 November 1535, Pietro Ranieri was appointed by Pope Paul III as Bishop of Strongoli. On 7 December 1535, he was consecrated bishop by Giovanni De Rosa, Bishop of Krk with Giacomo Ponzetti, Bishop of Molfetta, and Alfonso Oliva, Bishop of Bovino, serving as co-consecrators. He served as Bishop of Strongoli until his resignation in 1541.

== External links and additional sources ==
- Cheney, David M. "Diocese of Strongoli". Catholic-Hierarchy.org. (for Chronology of Bishops) ^{[self-published]}
- Chow, Gabriel. "Titular Episcopal See of Strongoli (Italy)". GCatholic.org. (for Chronology of Bishops) ^{[self-published]}

Catholic Church titles
Preceded by Girolamo Grimaldi	Bishop of Strongoli; 1535–1541	Succeeded by Girolamo Zacconi
