= Giovanni Battista Carrone =

18th-century Roman Catholic bishop

Most Reverend Giovanni Battista Carrone
- Bishop of Strongoli
- Church: Catholic Church
- Diocese: Diocese of Strongoli
- In office: 1692–1706
- Predecessor: Antonio Maria Camalda
- Successor: Tommaso Olivieri

Orders
- Consecration: 13 Jan 1692 by Galeazzo Marescotti

Personal details
- Born: 11 Dec 1641 San Guido d'Ostuni, Italy
- Died: Apr 1706 (age 76)

Giovanni Battista Carrone (1641–1706) was a Roman Catholic prelate who served as Bishop of Strongoli (1692–1706).

== Biography ==
Giovanni Battista Carrone was born on 11 December 1641 in San Guido d'Ostuni, Italy. On 19 Dec 1691, he was appointed during the papacy of Pope Innocent XII as Bishop of Strongoli. On 13 Jan 1692, he was consecrated bishop by Galeazzo Marescotti, Cardinal-Priest of Santi Quirico e Giulitta, with Giuseppe Bologna, Archbishop of Capua, and Stefano Giuseppe Menatti, Titular Bishop of Cyrene, serving as co-consecrators. He served as Bishop of Strongoli until his death in Apr 1706.

== External links and additional sources ==
- Cheney, David M. "Diocese of Strongoli". Catholic-Hierarchy.org. (for Chronology of Bishops) ^{[self-published]}
- Chow, Gabriel. "Titular Episcopal See of Strongoli (Italy)". GCatholic.org. (for Chronology of Bishops) ^{[self-published]}

Catholic Church titles
Preceded by Antonio Maria Camalda	Bishop of Strongoli; 1692–1706	Succeeded by Tommaso Olivieri
