= Domenico Campanella =

Most Reverend Domenico Campanella
- Bishop of Sant'Agata de' Goti
- Church: Catholic Church
- Diocese: Diocese of Sant'Agata de' Goti
- In office: 1654–1663
- Predecessor: Giovanni Agostino Gandolfo
- Successor: Biagio Mazzella

Orders
- Consecration: 18 January 1654 by Giovanni Battista Maria Pallotta

Personal details
- Born: 24 September 1581 Putigliano, Italy
- Died: 10 January 1663 (age 82) Rome, Italy

Domenico Campanella, O. Carm. (24 September 1581 – 10 January 1663) was a Roman Catholic prelate who served as Bishop of Sant'Agata de' Goti (1654–1663).

== Biography ==
Domenico Campanella was born in Putigliano, Italy and ordained a priest in the Order of the Brothers of the Blessed Virgin Mary of Mount Carmel. On 12 January 1654, he was appointed during the papacy of Pope Innocent X as Bishop of Sant'Agata de' Goti. On 18 January 1654, he was consecrated bishop by Giovanni Battista Maria Pallotta, Cardinal-Priest of San Pietro in Vincoli, with Patrizio Donati, Bishop Emeritus of Minori, and Giuseppe Ciantes, Bishop of Marsico Nuovo, serving as co-consecrators. He served as Bishop of Sant'Agata de' Goti until his death on 10 January 1663 in Rome.

== External links and additional sources ==
- Cheney, David M. "Diocese of Sant'Agata de' Goti". Catholic-Hierarchy.org. (for Chronology of Bishops) ^{[self-published]}
- Chow, Gabriel. "Diocese of Sant'Agata de' Goti (Italy)". GCatholic.org. (for Chronology of Bishops) ^{[self-published]}

Catholic Church titles
Preceded by Giovanni Agostino Gandolfo	Bishop of Sant'Agata de' Goti; 1654–1663	Succeeded by Biagio Mazzella
