= Domenico Petrucci =

Most Reverend Domenico Petrucci
- Bishop of Bisignano
- Church: Catholic Church
- Diocese: Diocese of Bisignano
- In office: 1584–1598
- Predecessor: Pompeo Belli
- Successor: Bernardo del Nero

Orders
- Consecration: 17 June 1582 by Giulio Antonio Santorio

Personal details
- Died: 1598 Bisignano, Italy

Domenico Petrucci (died 1598) was a Roman Catholic prelate who served as Bishop of Bisignano (1584–1598) and Bishop of Strongoli (1582–1584).

On 17 June 1582, Domenico Petrucci was appointed during the papacy of Pope Gregory XIII as Bishop of Strongoli. On 17 June 1582, he was consecrated bishop by Giulio Antonio Santorio, Cardinal-Priest of San Bartolomeo all'Isola, with Giovanni Battista Santorio, Bishop of Alife, and Agostino Quinzio, Bishop of Korčula, serving as co-consecrators. On 23 July 1584, he was appointed during the papacy of Pope Gregory XIII as Bishop of Bisignano. He served as Bishop of Bisignano until his death in 1598.

While bishop, he was the principal co-consecrator of Francesco Antonio D'Affitto, Bishop of San Marco (1585).

== External links and additional sources ==
- Cheney, David M. "Diocese of Strongoli". Catholic-Hierarchy.org. (for Chronology of Bishops) ^{[self-published]}
- Chow, Gabriel. "Titular Episcopal See of Strongoli (Italy)". GCatholic.org. (for Chronology of Bishops) ^{[self-published]}
- Cheney, David M. "Diocese of Bisignano". Catholic-Hierarchy.org. (for Chronology of Bishops) ^{[self-published]}
- Chow, Gabriel. "Diocese of Bisignano (Italy)". GCatholic.org. (for Chronology of Bishops) ^{[self-published]}

Catholic Church titles
| Preceded by Rinaldo Corso | Bishop of Strongoli; 1582–1584 | Succeeded by Giovanni Luigi Marescotti |
| Preceded by Pompeo Belli | Bishop of Bisignano; 1584–1598 | Succeeded by Bernardo del Nero |
