= Marcello Lorenzi =

17th-century Roman Catholic bishop

Most Reverend Marcello Lorenzi
- Bishop of Strongoli
- Church: Catholic Church
- Diocese: Diocese of Strongoli
- In office: 1600–1601
- Predecessor: Claudio Vico
- Successor: Sebastiano Ghislieri

Orders
- Consecration: 13 February 1600 by Antonmaria Sauli

Personal details
- Died: 1601

Marcello Lorenzi was a Roman Catholic prelate who served as Bishop of Strongoli (1600–1601).

== Biography ==
On 31 January 1600, Marcello Lorenzi was appointed during the papacy of Pope Clement VIII as Bishop of Strongoli. On 13 February 1600, he was consecrated bishop by Antonmaria Sauli, Cardinal-Priest of Santo Stefano al Monte Celio, with Agostino Quinzio, Bishop of Korčula, and Alessandro Filarete, Bishop of Umbriatico, serving as co-consecrators. He served as Bishop of Strongoli until his death in 1601.

== External links and additional sources ==
- Cheney, David M. "Diocese of Strongoli". Catholic-Hierarchy.org. (for Chronology of Bishops) ^{[self-published]}
- Chow, Gabriel. "Titular Episcopal See of Strongoli (Italy)". GCatholic.org. (for Chronology of Bishops) ^{[self-published]}

Catholic Church titles
Preceded by Claudio Vico	Bishop of Strongoli; 1600–1601	Succeeded by Sebastiano Ghislieri
