= Ascanio II Piccolomini =

Roman Catholic archbishop

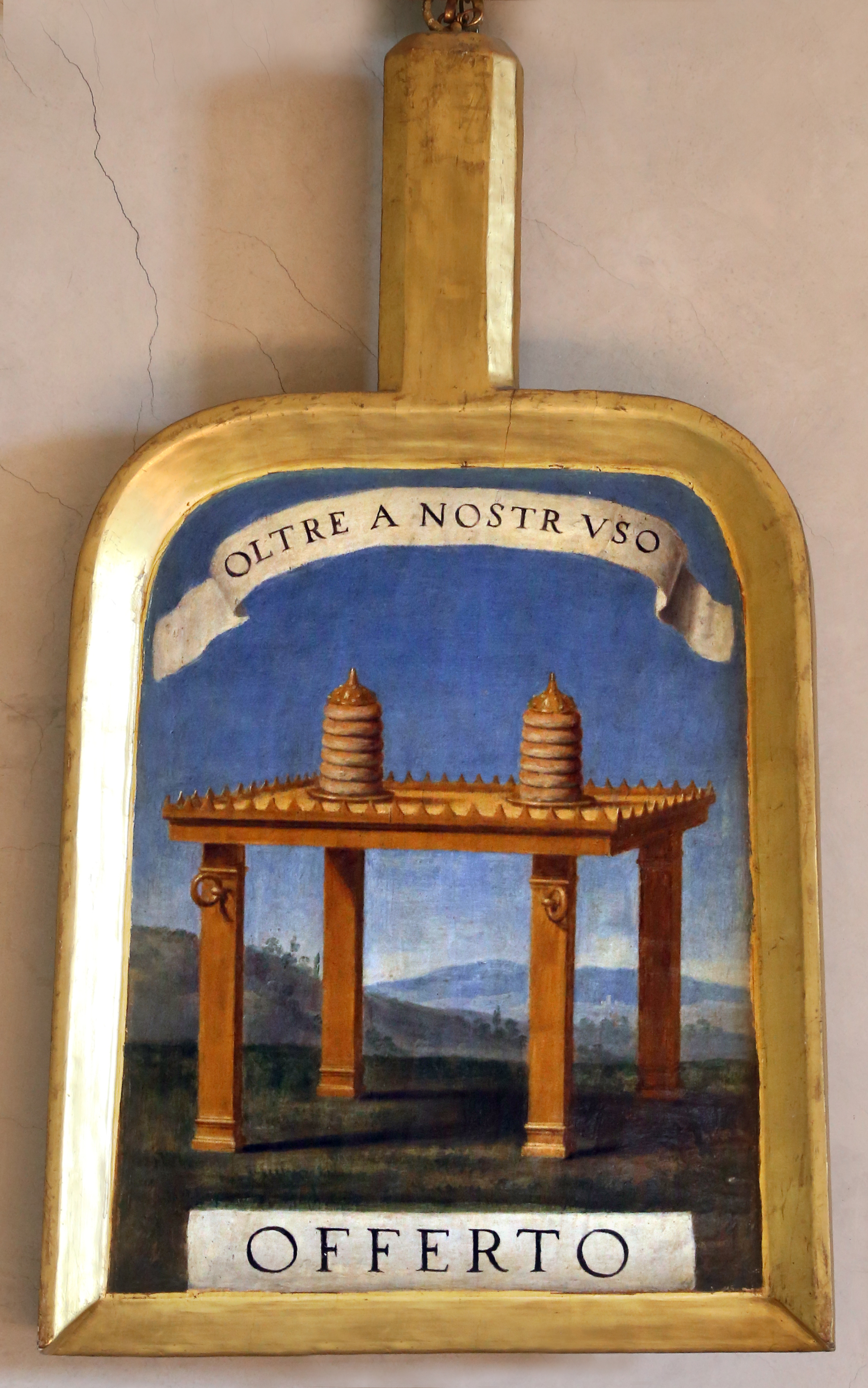
Shovel of Ascanio Piccolomini in the Accademia della Crusca

Ascanio Piccolomini (1596–1671) was the archbishop of Siena from 1629 to 1671.

Ascanio was a mathematics pupil of Bonaventura Cavalieri. He hosted Galileo in Siena. According to Dava Sobel, Galileo's ability "to rise from the ashes of his condemnation by the Inquisition" and complete perhaps his most influential book, the Two New Sciences, was "due in large measure to Piccolomini's solicitous kindness".

He was an elder brother of the Imperial general Ottavio Piccolomini.

While bishop, he was the principal co-consecrator of Carlo Fabrizio Giustiniani, Bishop of Accia and Mariana (1656).

== Sources ==
- Pecci, Giovanni Antonio (1748). Storia del Vescovado della città di Siena (in Italian). Lucca: Marescandoli. pp. 364–366.
- Suter, Rufus (1965). "A Note on the Identity of Ascanio Piccolomini, Galileo's Host at Siena," Isis Vol. 56, No. 4 (Winter, 1965), p. 452.

Catholic Church titles
Preceded by Alessandro Petrucci	Archbishop of Siena; 1628–1671	Succeeded by Celio Piccolomini
