= Giacomo Ponzetti =

Most Reverend Giacomo Ponzetti
- Bishop of Molfetta
- Church: Catholic Church
- Diocese: Diocese of Molfetta
- In office: 1518–1553
- Predecessor: Ferdinando Ponzetti
- Successor: Nicola Maggiorani

Giacomo Ponzetti or Giacomo Poncetti was a Roman Catholic prelate who served as Bishop of Molfetta (1518–1553).

== Biography ==
On 12 July 1518, Giacomo Ponzetti was appointed during the papacy of Pope Leo X as Bishop of Molfetta. He served as Bishop of Molfetta until his resignation in 1553.

== Episcopal succession ==
While bishop, he was the principal co-consecrator of:

- Pietro Ranieri, Bishop of Strongoli (1535);
- Giovanni Michele Saraceni, Archbishop of Acerenza e Matera (1536); and
- François de Mauny, Bishop of Saint-Brieuc (1545).

== External links and additional sources ==
- Cheney, David M. "Diocese of Molfetta-Ruvo-Giovinazzo-Terlizzi". Catholic-Hierarchy.org. (for Chronology of Bishops) ^{[self-published]}
- Chow, Gabriel. "Diocese of Molfetta-Ruvo-Giovinazzo-Terlizzi (Italy)". GCatholic.org. (for Chronology of Bishops) ^{[self-published]}

Catholic Church titles
Preceded by Ferdinando Ponzetti	Bishop of Molfetta; 1518–1553	Succeeded by Nicola Maggiorani
