= Antonio Maria Camalda =

17th-century Roman Catholic bishop

Most Reverend Antonio Maria Camalda
- Bishop of Strongoli
- Church: Catholic Church
- Diocese: Diocese of Strongoli
- In office: 1663–1690
- Predecessor: Biagio Mazzella
- Successor: Giovanni Battista Carrone

Personal details
- Born: 1601 Belvedere, Italy
- Died: Dec 1690 (age 89)

Antonio Maria Camalda (1601–1690) was a Roman Catholic prelate who served as Bishop of Strongoli (1663–1690).

== Biography ==
Antonio Maria Camalda was born in 1601 in Belvedere, Italy. On 2 Jul 1663, he was appointed during the papacy of Pope Alexander VII as Bishop of Strongoli. He served as Bishop of Strongoli until his death in Dec 1690.

== External links and additional sources ==
- Cheney, David M. "Diocese of Strongoli". Catholic-Hierarchy.org. (for Chronology of Bishops) ^{[self-published]}
- Chow, Gabriel. "Titular Episcopal See of Strongoli (Italy)". GCatholic.org. (for Chronology of Bishops) ^{[self-published]}

Catholic Church titles
Preceded by Biagio Mazzella	Bishop of Strongoli; 1663–1690	Succeeded by Giovanni Battista Carrone
