= Pietro Ostini =

Italian papal diplomat and Cardinal

His Eminence Pietro Ostini
- Cardinal-Bishop
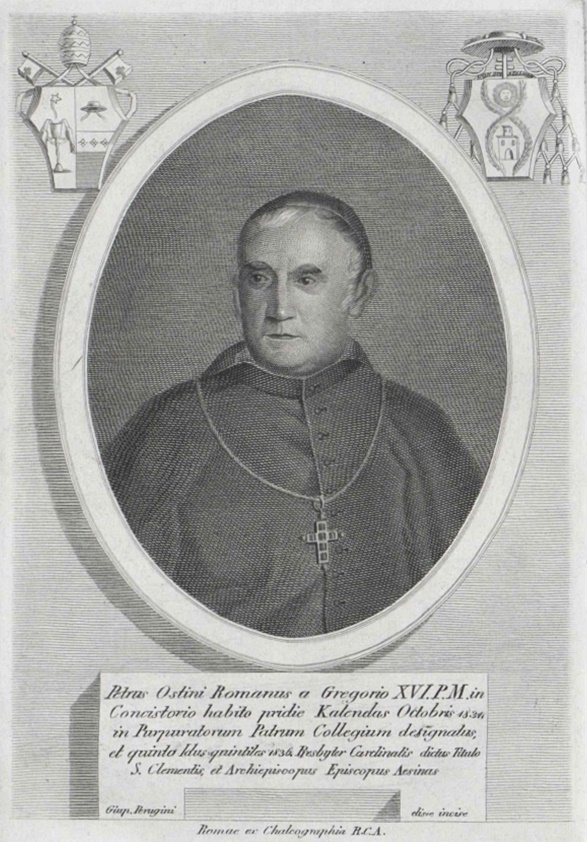
- Diocese: Bishop of Albano (1843–1849); Bishop of Jesi (1836–1841)

Orders
- Consecration: 12 August 1827 by Cardinal Giacomo Giustiniani
- Created cardinal: 30 September 1831 (in pectore); 11 July 1836 (publicized) by Pope Gregory XVI
- Rank: Cardinal Priest of San Clemente (1836–1843)

Personal details
- Born: 27 April 1775 Rome, IT
- Died: 5 March 1849 (aged 73) Naples IT
- Buried: Cathedral of Naples
- Occupation: educator, diplomat, administrator
- Profession: priest, bishop
- Education: Rome, Collegio Romano
- Motto: Non otia palmam
- Coat of arms

Pietro Ostini (27 April 1775 – 5 March 1849) was an Italian papal diplomat and Cardinal.

Ostini was born in Rome on 27 April 1775. He was educated at the Collegio Romano.

He was Professor of Church History at the Collegio Romano, both before and after the deportation of Pope Pius VII to France (1809–1814) and the French occupation of Rome. During the occupation, he was observed to be friendly to the French authorities and an admirer of Napoleon, and on the return of the Pope to Rome and the beginning of papal actions against collaborators, Ostini was denounced. Pius was determined to deport him to Corsica, but Bishop Giuseppe Menocchio, the Pope's confessor, who had remained in Rome during the occupation, intervened and pointed out the good work that Ostini had done in converting a number of prominent Protestants to the Catholic faith. He was spared. The Pope eventually became convinced that Ostini had already undergone a radical change in outlook toward Napoleon and the French.

Early in 1823, he was offered the post of Apostolic Visitor to Chile, but he declined. He entered the papal diplomatic corps after the deaths of Pius VII and Cardinal Consalvi, and served as Internuncio at Vienna from 1824 to 1827. He was named titular Archbishop of Tarsus on 9 April 1827, and consecrated by Cardinal Giacomo Giustiniani. He served in Lucerne as Nuncio to the Swiss Confederation in 1828, where he signed the Conventions that incorporated the Thurgau and the Aargau into the newly organized diocese of Berne. He was papal Nuncio in Brazil in 1829–1831, he returned to Vienna as Nuncio in 1832–1836.

Ostini was named a cardinal in the consistory of 30 September 1831 by Pope Gregory XVI, but the appointment was kept secret until the day that he was transferred to the diocese of Jesi on 11 July 1836. He was presented with the red biretta in Vienna by the Emperor personally on 25 July. On 21 November 1836, he was assigned the titular church of San Clemente in Rome.

He resigned the diocese of Jesi on 19 December 1841, in anticipation of being named Prefect of the Congregation of Bishops and Regulars. The appointment was announced on 25 January 1842.

Cardinal Ostini became bishop of Albano on 3 April 1843. He held a diocesan synod in Albano on 23—25 May 1847.

Because of the anti-papal revolution in Rome, Ostini fled to Naples, while the Pope fled to Gaeta. The Cardinal died in exile in Naples on 5 March 1849.

== Bibliography ==
- De Marchi, Giuseppe (1957). Le nunziature apostoliche dal 1800 al 1956 (in Italian). Roma: Ed. di Storia e Letteratura. pp. 46, 75, 244.
- Moroni, Gaetano, ed. (1851). Dizionario di erudizione storico-ecclesiastica (in Italian). Vol. L. Venezia: Tipografia Emiliana. pp. 56–57.
- Reinerman, Alan J. (1989). Austria and the Papacy in the Age of Metternich: Revolution and reaction, 1830-1838. Catholic University of America Press. pp. 233–237, 272–274, 396. ISBN 978-0-8132-0548-9.
- Ritzler, Remigius; Sefrin, Pirminus (1968). Hierarchia Catholica medii et recentioris aevi (in Latin). Vol. VII (1800–1846). Monasterii: Libreria Regensburgiana. pp. 61, 360.
- Wolff, Joseph (1860). Travels and Adventures of Joseph Wolff. Vol. I. London: Saunders, Otley. pp. 69–71.
