= Tommaso Orsini =

Italian Catholic bishop (1576)

Most Reverend Tommaso Orsini
- Bishop of Foligno
- Church: Catholic Church
- Diocese: Diocese of Foligno
- In office: 1568–1576
- Predecessor: Clemente d'Olera
- Successor: Ippolito Bosco
- Previous post: Bishop of Strongoli (1566–1568)

Orders
- Consecration: 28 August 1566 by Clemente d'Olera

Personal details
- Died: 25 January 1576 Foligno, Italy

Tommaso Orsini (died 25 January 1576) was a Roman Catholic prelate who served as Bishop of Foligno (1568–1576) and Bishop of Strongoli (1566–1568).

== Biography ==
On 15 August 1566, Tommaso Orsini was appointed during the papacy of Pope Gregory XIII as Bishop of Strongoli. On 28 August 1566, he was consecrated bishop by Clemente d'Olera, Cardinal-Priest of Santa Maria in Ara Coeli, with Antonmaria Salviati, Bishop Emeritus of Saint-Papoul, and Giulio Antonio Santorio, Archbishop of Santa Severina, serving as co-consecrators. On 23 January 1568, he was appointed Bishop of Foligno by Pope Gregory XIII. He served as Bishop of Foligno until his death on 25 January 1576.

== External links and additional sources ==
- Cheney, David M. "Diocese of Strongoli". Catholic-Hierarchy.org. (for Chronology of Bishops) ^{[self-published]}
- Chow, Gabriel. "Titular Episcopal See of Strongoli (Italy)". GCatholic.org. (for Chronology of Bishops) ^{[self-published]}
- Cheney, David M. "Diocese of Foligno". Catholic-Hierarchy.org. (for Chronology of Bishops) ^{[self-published]}
- Chow, Gabriel. "Diocese of Foligno (Italy)". GCatholic.org. (for Chronology of Bishops) ^{[self-published]}

Catholic Church titles
| Preceded by Matteo Zacconi | Bishop of Strongoli; 1566–1568 | Succeeded by Timoteo Giustiniani |
| Preceded by Clemente d'Olera | Bishop of Foligno; 1568–1576 | Succeeded by Ippolito Bosco |
