= Fausto Malari =

Most Reverend Fausto Malari
- Bishop of Chiusi
- Church: Catholic Church
- Diocese: Diocese of Chiusi
- In office: 1602–1608
- Predecessor: Ludovico Martelli
- Successor: Orazio Spannocchi

Orders
- Consecration: 5 May 1602 by Camillo Borghese

Personal details
- Died: 1608 Chiusi, Italy

Fausto Malari or Fausto Molari or Fausto Mellari (died 1608) was a Roman Catholic prelate who served as Bishop of Chiusi (1602–1608).

== Biography ==
Malari was a native of Siena.

He is attested as Vicar General of the Archbishop of Siena in 1592 and again in 1596.

On 22 April 1602, Fausto Malari was appointed Bishop of Chiusi by Pope Clement VIII. On 5 May 1602, he was consecrated bishop by Camillo Borghese, Cardinal-Priest of San Crisogono, with Guglielmo Bastoni, Bishop of Pavia, and Horace Capponi, Bishop of Carpentras, serving as co-consecrators. He served as Bishop of Chiusi until his death in 1608.

Catholic Church titles
Preceded by Ludovico Martelli	Bishop of Chiusi; 1602–1608	Succeeded by Orazio Spannocchi
