= Biagio Mazzella =

17th-century Roman Catholic bishop

Most Reverend Biagio Mazzella
- Bishop of Sant'Agata de' Goti
- Church: Catholic Church
- Diocese: Diocese of Sant'Agata de' Goti
- In office: 1663–1664
- Predecessor: Domenico Campanella
- Successor: Giacomo Circio
- Previous post: Bishop of Strongoli (1655–1663)

Orders
- Consecration: Nov 1655

Personal details
- Born: Naples, Italy
- Died: 1664

Biagio Mazzella, O.P. (died 1664) was a Roman Catholic prelate who served as Bishop of Sant'Agata de' Goti (1663–1664) and Bishop of Strongoli (1655–1663).

== Biography ==
Biagio Mazzella was born in Naples, Italy and ordained a priest in the Order of Preachers. On 25 Oct 1655, he was appointed during the papacy of Pope Alexander VII as Bishop of Strongoli. In Nov 1655, he was consecrated bishop by Giovanni Battista Maria Pallotta, Cardinal-Priest of San Pietro in Vincoli. On 26 Feb 1663, he was appointed during the papacy of Pope Alexander VII as Bishop of Sant'Agata de' Goti. He served as Bishop of Sant'Agata de' Goti until his death in 1664.

== External links and additional sources ==
- Cheney, David M. "Diocese of Strongoli". Catholic-Hierarchy.org. (for Chronology of Bishops) ^{[self-published]}
- Chow, Gabriel. "Titular Episcopal See of Strongoli (Italy)". GCatholic.org. (for Chronology of Bishops) ^{[self-published]}
- Cheney, David M. "Diocese of Sant'Agata de' Goti". Catholic-Hierarchy.org. (for Chronology of Bishops) ^{[self-published]}
- Chow, Gabriel. "Diocese of Sant'Agata de' Goti (Italy)". GCatholic.org. (for Chronology of Bishops) ^{[self-published]}

Catholic Church titles
Preceded by Martino Denti de' Cipriani	Bishop of Strongoli; 1655–1663	Succeeded by Antonio Maria Camalda
Preceded by Domenico Campanella	Bishop of Sant'Agata de' Goti; 1663–1664	Succeeded by Giacomo Circio
