= Giovanni Luigi Marescotti =

Most Reverend Giovanni Luigi Marescotti
- Bishop of Strongoli
- Church: Catholic Church
- Diocese: Diocese of Strongoli
- In office: 1585–1587
- Predecessor: Domenico Petrucci
- Successor: Claudio Marescotti

Personal details
- Died: 1587 Strongoli, Italy

Giovanni Luigi Marescotti (died 1587) was a Roman Catholic prelate who served as Bishop of Strongoli (1585–1587).

On 14 January 1585, Giovanni Luigi Marescotti was appointed by Pope Gregory XIII as Bishop of Strongoli. He served as Bishop of Strongoli until his death in 1587.

== External links and additional sources ==
- Cheney, David M. "Diocese of Strongoli". Catholic-Hierarchy.org. (for Chronology of Bishops) ^{[self-published]}
- Chow, Gabriel. "Titular Episcopal See of Strongoli (Italy)". GCatholic.org. (for Chronology of Bishops) ^{[self-published]}

Catholic Church titles
Preceded by Domenico Petrucci	Bishop of Strongoli; 1585–1587	Succeeded by Claudio Marescotti
