= Ferdinando Ponzetti =

Italian Roman Catholic bishop and cardinal

Ferdinando Ponzetti (1444–1527) was an Italian Roman Catholic bishop and cardinal.

== Biography ==
Ferdinando Ponzetti was born in Florence in 1444, the son of a noble Neapolitan family. He studied Christian theology, philosophy, Greek, Latin and medicine.

He was the personal physician of Pope Innocent VIII. He was then Lector of the Audience of lettere Contraddette. He was an Apostolic Secretary under Pope Alexander VI and Pope Julius II. He then joined the Apostolic Camera, serving as its dean, president, and treasurer in 1513.

On 20 April 1517 he was elected Bishop of Molfetta. He was consecrated as a bishop in the Vatican in camera superiore by Pope Leo X.

Pope Leo X made him a cardinal priest in the consistory of 1 July 1517. He received the red hat and the titular church of San Pancrazio.

He resigned the administration of the see of Molfetta to his nephew Giacomo Ponzetta on 12 July 1518. He participated in the papal conclave of 1521-22 that elected Pope Adrian VI. On 22 December 1522 he was transferred to the see of Grosseto, occupying this see until resigning on 25 February 1527. He participated in the papal conclave of 1523 that elected Pope Clement VII. He lost all of his wealth during the Bourbon sack of Rome in 1526.

Following mistreatment by imperial soldiers during the Sack of Rome (1527), he died in Rome on 9 September 1527. He is buried in Santa Maria della Pace.

Catholic Church titles
Preceded by Alessio Celadoni di Celadonia	Bishop of Molfetta; 1517-1518	Succeeded by Giacomo Ponzetti
Preceded by	Cardinal-Priest of San Pancrazio; 1517-1527	Succeeded by Francesco Cornaro (seniore)
Preceded by Raffaello Petrucci	Bishop of Grosseto; 1522-1527	Succeeded by Wolfgang Goler
