= Claudio Marescotti =

16th-century Roman Catholic bishop

Most Reverend Claudio Marescotti
- Bishop of Strongoli
- Church: Catholic Church
- Diocese: Diocese of Strongoli
- In office: 1587–1590
- Predecessor: Giovanni Luigi Marescotti
- Successor: Claudio Vico

Orders
- Consecration: 19 May 1587 by Gabriele Paleotti

Personal details
- Born: 1520
- Died: 24 Feb 1590 (age 70)

Claudio Marescotti, O.S.B. (1520–1590) was a Roman Catholic prelate who served as Bishop of Strongoli (1587–1590).

== Biography ==
Claudio Marescotti was born in 1520 and ordained a priest in the Order of Saint Benedict. On 18 Feb 1587, he was appointed during the papacy of Pope Sixtus V as Bishop of Strongoli. On 19 May 1587, he was consecrated bishop by Gabriele Paleotti, Archbishop of Bologna, with Annibale Grassi, Bishop of Faenza, and Vincenzo Casali, Bishop of Massa Marittima, serving as co-consecrators. He served as Bishop of Strongoli until his death on 24 Feb 1590.

== External links and additional sources ==
- Cheney, David M. "Diocese of Strongoli". Catholic-Hierarchy.org. (for Chronology of Bishops) ^{[self-published]}
- Chow, Gabriel. "Titular Episcopal See of Strongoli (Italy)". GCatholic.org. (for Chronology of Bishops) ^{[self-published]}

Catholic Church titles
Preceded by Giovanni Luigi Marescotti	Bishop of Strongoli; 1587–1590	Succeeded by Claudio Vico
