= Pope Paul V =

Head of the Catholic Church from 1605 to 1621

- Bishop of Rome
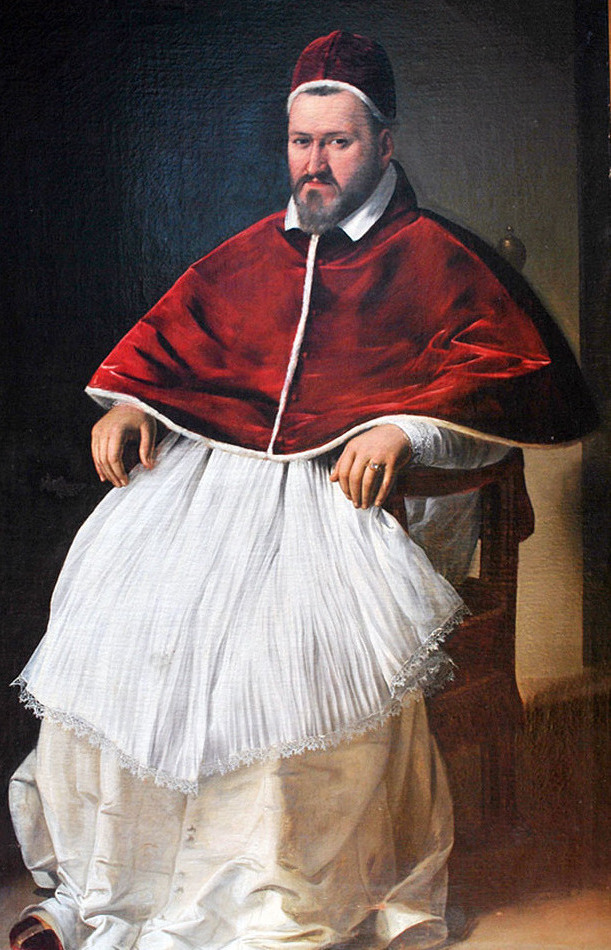
- Portrait of Pope Paul V by Caravaggio (c. 1605–06)
- Church: Catholic Church
- Papacy began: 16 May 1605
- Papacy ended: 28 January 1621
- Predecessor: Leo XI
- Successor: Gregory XV
- Previous posts: Cardinal-Priest of Sant'Eusebio (1596–1605); Cardinal Vicar of Rome (1603–1605); Bishop of Jesi (1597–1599); Cardinal-Priest of San Crisogono (1602–1605); Cardinal-Priest of Santi Giovanni e Paolo (1599–1602)

Orders
- Ordination: 20 October 1577
- Consecration: 27 May 1597 by Clement VIII
- Created cardinal: 5 June 1596 by Clement VIII

Personal details
- Born: Camillo Borghese; 17 September 1550/1552 Rome, Papal States
- Died: 28 January 1621 (aged 68) Rome, Papal States
- Motto: Absit nisi in te gloriari (Far, but in your glory)
- Signature: Paul V's signature

- Coat of arms: Paul V's coat of arms

Pope Paul V (Latin: Paulus PP. V; Italian: Paolo V) (17 September 1550/1552 – 28 January 1621), born Camillo Borghese, was head of the Catholic Church and ruler of the Papal States from 16 May 1605 to his death, in January 1621. In 1611, he made Galileo Galilei a member of the papal Accademia dei Lincei. In 1616, Pope Paul V instructed Cardinal Robert Bellarmine to inform Galileo that the Copernican theory could not be taught as fact, but Bellarmine's certificate allowed Galileo to continue his studies in search for evidence and use the geocentric model as a theoretical device. That same year Paul V assured Galileo that he was safe from persecution so long as he, the Pope, should live. Bellarmine's certificate was used by Galileo for his defense at the trial of 1633.

Trained in jurisprudence, Borghese was made Cardinal-Priest of Sant'Eusebio and the Cardinal Vicar of Rome by Pope Clement VIII. He was elected as Pope in 1605, following the death of Pope Leo XI. Pope Paul V was known for being stern and unyielding, defending the privileges of the Church. He met with Galileo Galilei in 1616 and was involved in the controversy over heliocentrism. He canonized and beatified several individuals during his papacy and created 60 cardinals in ten consistories.

His insistence on ecclesiastical jurisdiction led to conflicts with secular governments, notably with Venice, which resulted in an interdict on the city in 1606. This disagreement was eventually mediated by France and Spain in 1607. Pope Paul V's diplomacy also strained relations with England, as his actions were perceived as undermining moderate Catholics in the country.

In Rome, he financed the completion of St. Peter's Basilica, improved the Vatican Library, and restored the ancient Roman aqueduct Aqua Traiana. Pope Paul V established the Banco di Santo Spirito in 1605 and is also known for fostering the rise of the Borghese family through nepotism. He died on 28 January 1621, after suffering from a series of strokes and was succeeded by Pope Gregory XV.

== Early life ==
Camillo Borghese was born in Rome on 17 September 1550/1552 into the Borghese family of Siena which had recently established itself in Rome. He was the eldest of seven sons of the lawyer and Sienese patrician Marcantonio Borghese and his wife Flaminia Astalli, a Roman noblewoman. Camillo was carefully trained in jurisprudence at Perugia and Padua, and became a canonist of marked ability.

=== Cardinal ===
In June 1596 Camillo was made the Cardinal-Priest of Sant'Eusebio and the Cardinal Vicar of Rome by Pope Clement VIII, and had as his secretary Niccolò Alamanni. He then opted for other titular churches like San Crisogono and Santi Giovanni e Paolo.

Clement VIII also bestowed upon him episcopal consecration in 1597 after his appointment as Bishop of Jesi; the co-consecrators were Cardinal Silvio Savelli (former Latin Patriarch of Constantinople) and Cardinal Francesco Cornaro (former Bishop of Treviso). Camillo retained the diocese of Jesi until 1599. He held aloof from all parties and factions, devoting all his spare time to his law-books.

== Papacy ==
=== Election ===
When Pope Leo XI died, 1605, Cardinal Borghese became pope over a number of candidates including Caesar Baronius and Robert Bellarmine; his neutrality in the factional times made him an ideal compromise candidate.

In character he was very stern and unyielding, a lawyer rather than diplomat, who defended the privileges of the Church to his utmost. His first act was to send home to their sees the bishops who were sojourning in Rome, for the Council of Trent had insisted that every bishop reside in his diocese.

Papal styles of Pope Paul V
- Reference style: His Holiness
- Spoken style: Your Holiness
- Religious style: Holy Father
- Posthumous style: None

=== Theology ===
In 1611, Paul honored Galileo Galilei as a member of the papal Accademia dei Lincei and supported his discoveries. He met with Galileo Galilei in 1616 after Cardinal Bellarmine had, on his orders, warned Galileo not to hold or defend the heliocentric ideas of Copernicus. Whether there was also an order not to teach those ideas in any way has been a matter for controversy. A letter from Bellarmine to Galileo states only the injunction that the heliocentric ideas could not be defended or held; this letter was written expressly to enable Galileo to defend himself against rumors concerning what had happened in the meeting with Bellarmine.

In 1618, a Decreto de Nuestro Sanctissimo Padre el Papa Paulo V. en favor dela Immaculada Concepción dela Sanctissima Virgen Madre de Dios y Señora Nuestra (Decree of our most holy father Pope Paul V in favor of the Immaculate Conception of the blessed Virgin Mary,..) was published in Lima, Peru.

=== Canonisations and beatifications ===
Paul V canonised Charles Borromeo on 1 November 1610 and Frances of Rome on 29 May 1608. He also canonized Pompejanus in 1615 and canonized Cardinal Albert de Louvain on 9 August 1621.

He also beatified a number of individuals which included Ignatius Loyola (27 July 1609), Philip Neri (11 May 1615), Teresa of Avila (24 April 1614), Aloysius Gonzaga (10 October 1605), and Francis Xavier (25 October 1619).

=== Consistories ===
The pope created 60 cardinals in ten consistories held during his pontificate. He named his nephew Scipione Borghese as a cardinal (continuing the trend of nepotism) and also named Alessandro Ludovisi, who would become his immediate successor, Pope Gregory XV, as a cardinal.

=== Foreign relations ===
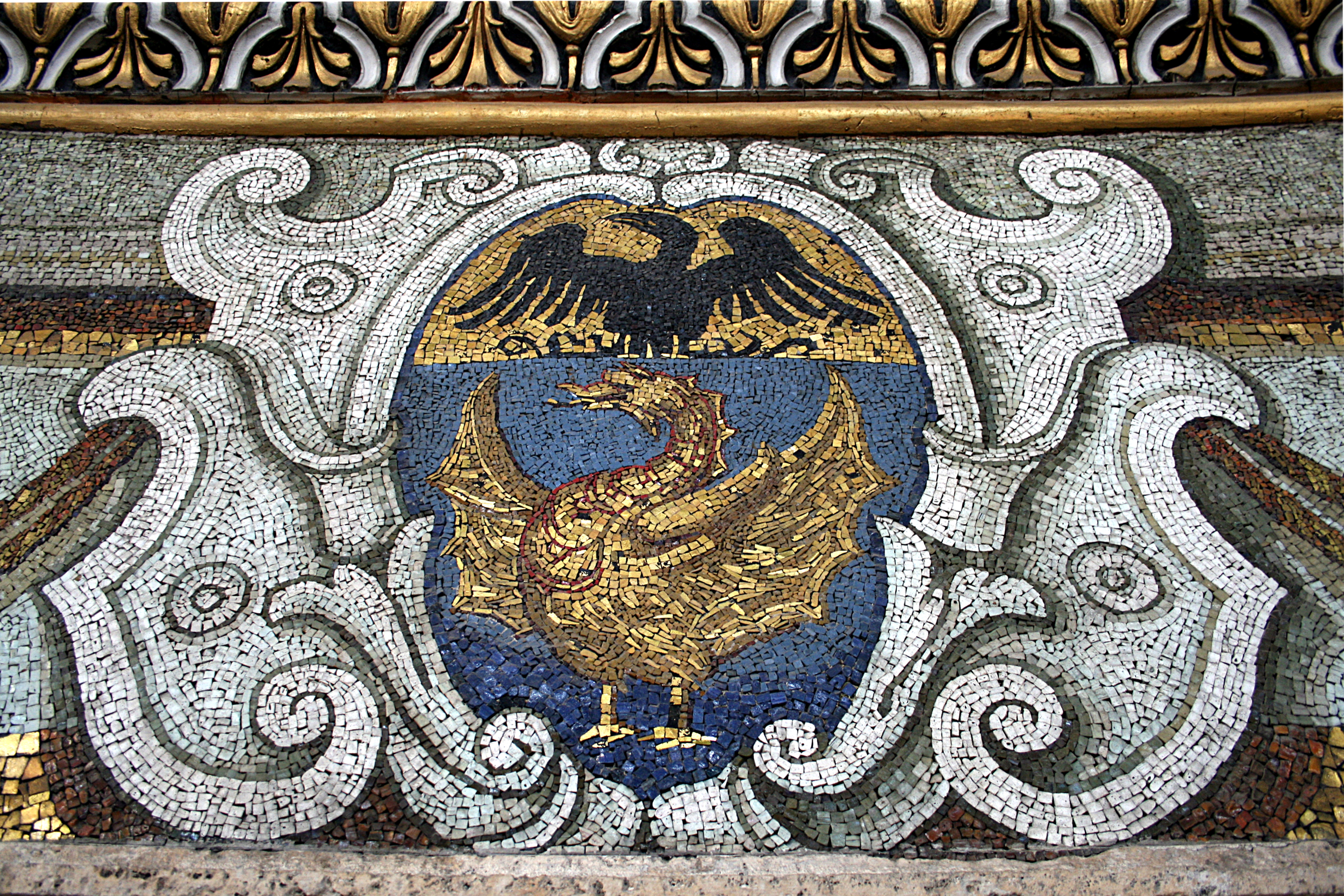
Mosaic depicting the arms of Pope Paul V (Camillo Borghese)

==== Ecclesiastical jurisdiction ====
Paul's insistence of ecclesiastical jurisdiction led to a number of quarrels between the Church and the secular governments of various states, notably Venice, where patricians, such as Ermolao Barbaro (1548–1622) of the noble Barbaro family, argued in favor of the exemption of the clergy from the jurisdiction of the civil courts. Venice passed two laws obnoxious to Paul, one forbidding the alienation of real estate in favour of the clergy, the second demanding approval of the civil power for the building of new churches. Two priests charged by the Venetian state with cruelty, wholesale poisoning, murder and licentiousness, were arrested by the Venetian Senate and put in dungeons for trial. Having been found guilty, they were committed to prison.

Paul V declared that the priests were not amenable to secular law and must be released to the Church. When this was refused, the Pope threatened an interdict on account of the property laws and the imprisonment of ecclesiastics, which threat was presented to the Senate on Christmas 1605. The Venetian position was ably defended by a canon lawyer, Paolo Sarpi, who extended the matter to general principles defining separate secular and ecclesiastical spheres. In April 1606 the Pope excommunicated the entire government of Venice and placed an interdict on the city. Father Sarpi strongly advised the Venetian government to refuse to receive the Pope's interdict, and to reason with him while opposing force by force. The Venetian Senate willingly accepted this advice and Fra Paolo presented the case to Paul V, urging from history that the Pope's claim to intermeddle in civil matters was a usurpation; and that in these matters the Republic of Venice recognized no authority but that of God. The rest of the Catholic clergy sided with the city, with the exception of the Jesuits, the Theatines, and the Capuchins. The dissenting clergy were forthwith expelled from Venetian territories. Masses continued to be said in Venice, and the feast of Corpus Christi was celebrated with displays of public pomp and "magnificence", in defiance of the Pope. Within a year (March 1607) the disagreement was mediated by France and Spain. The Most Serene Republic refused to retract the laws, but asserted that Venice would conduct herself "with her accustomed piety." The Jesuits, which Venice considered subversive Papal agents, remained banned. No more could be expected. Paul withdrew his censure.

The Venetian Republic rewarded Fra Paulo Sarpi, its successful canon lawyer, with the distinction of state counsellor in jurisprudence and the liberty of access to the state archives, which infuriated Pope Paul. In September 1607, after unsuccessfully attempting to lure Father Sarpi to Rome, the Pope responded by putting out a contract on his life. Father Sarpi was the target of at least two assassination plots in September and October. Stabbed three times with a stiletto, Fra Sarpi somehow managed to recover, while the assassins found refuge in the Papal States.

==== Relations with England ====
Paul V's hard-edged Catholic diplomacy cut the ground from under moderate Catholics in England. His letter of 9 July 1606 to congratulate James I on his accession to the throne was three years late and seemed to English eyes merely a preamble to what followed, and his reference to the Gunpowder Plot, made against the life of the monarch and all the members of Parliament the previous November, was unfortunate for the Papal cause, for Papal agents were considered by the English to have been involved (the effigy of Pope Paul V is still burnt every year during the Lewes Bonfire celebrations). However, the Pope in that letter pleaded with James not to make the innocent Catholics suffer for the crime of a few, and Paul V also promised to exhort all the Catholics of the realm to be submissive and loyal to their sovereign—in all things not opposed to the honour of God. The oath of allegiance James demanded of his subjects, however contained clauses to which no 17th-century Catholic could in conscience subscribe: the oath of allegiance was solemnly condemned in a brief published a matter of weeks later (22 September 1606, extended 23 August 1607). This condemnation served only to divide English Catholics. The other irritant (to the papacy) in English relations was Cardinal Bellarmine's letter to the English archpriest George Blackwell, reproaching him for having taken the oath of allegiance in apparent disregard of his duty to the Pope. The letter received enough circulation to be referred to in one of James's theological essays (1608), and Bellarmine was soon fencing in a pamphlet exchange with the king of England.

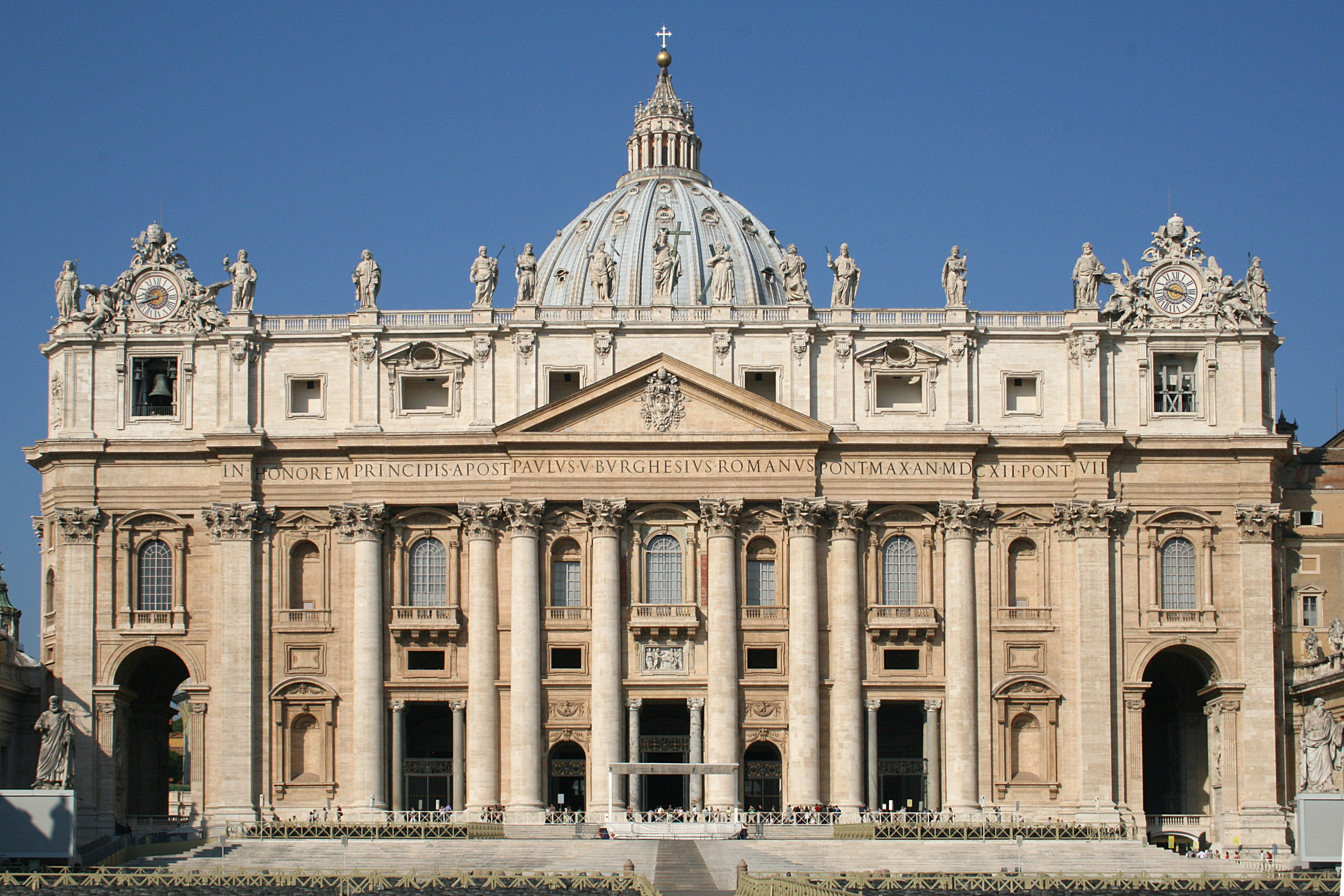
Facade of St. Peter's Basilica

==== Relations with Japan ====
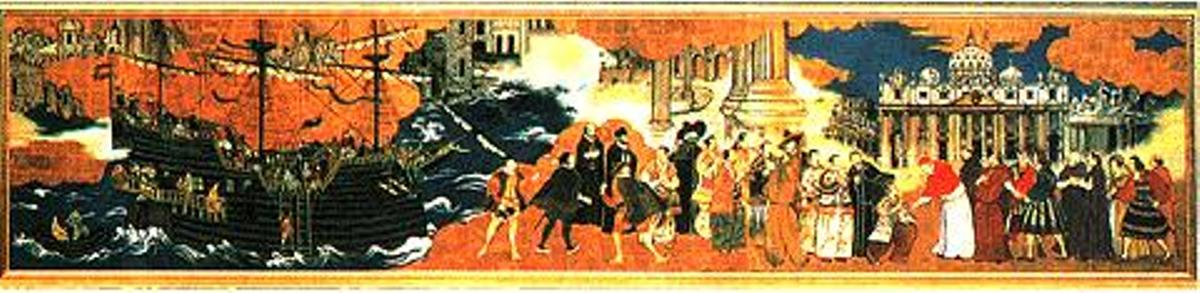
Pope Paul V welcoming the embassy of the Japanese samurai Hasekura Tsunenaga in Rome in 1615. Japanese painting, 17th century.

In November 1615, Paul V welcomed the embassy of the Japanese samurai Hasekura Tsunenaga in Rome.

Hasekura gave the Pope a letter (from Date Masamune) which requested a trade treaty between Japan and New Spain. The letter also asked for Christian missionaries to be sent to Japan. The Pope agreed to the dispatch of missionaries, but left the decision for trade to the King of Spain.

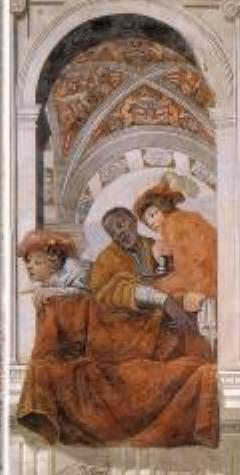
Painting of Emanuele Ne Vunda, ambassador from Alvaro II to Pope Paul V in 1604–1608, Sala dei Corazzieri, Qurinal Palace, Rome, 1615–1616.

=== Constructions ===
In Rome, the pope financed the completion of St. Peter's Basilica; this is noted in the Latin inscription across the facade of the Basilica, IN HONOREM PRINCIPIS APOST. PAULUS V BURGHESIUS ROMANUS PONT. MAX. AN. MDCXII PONT VII ("In honour of the Prince of the Apostles Paul V Borghese, Supreme Roman Pontiff, in the year 1612, the 7th year of his pontificate"). He also improved the Vatican Library, separating out the Vatican Apostolic Archives. He restored the Aqua Traiana, an ancient Roman aqueduct (named after him Acqua Paola), bringing water to the rioni located on right bank of the Tiber (Trastevere and Borgo) using materials from his demolition of the Forum of Nerva. He had always encouraged Guido Reni. Like many Popes of the time he was also allegedly guilty of nepotism, and his nephew Scipione Borghese wielded enormous power on his behalf, consolidating the rise of the Borghese family.

Paul V also established the Bank of the Holy Spirit in 1605.

=== Death ===
Paul V died on 28 January 1621 of a stroke in the Quirinal Palace and was succeeded as pope by Pope Gregory XV. The pope had been ill for more than three months following a series of strokes, and died six hours following his last stroke the morning of his death. He was interred in the basilica of Santa Maria Maggiore.

=== Episcopal succession ===
Episcopal succession of Pope Paul V

While bishop, he was the principal consecrator of:

- Valeriano Muti, Bishop of Bitetto (1599);
- Marco Agrippa Dandini, Bishop of Jesi (1599);
- Sebastiano Ghislieri, Bishop of Strongoli (1601);
- Peter Lombard, Archbishop of Armagh (1601);
- Alessandro Petrucci, Bishop of Massa Marittima (1602);
- Fausto Malari (Molari, Mellari), Bishop of Chiusi (1602);
- Simone Lunadori, Bishop of Nocera de' Pagani (1602);
- Giovanni Giovenale Ancina, Bishop of Saluzzo (1602);
- Fabrizio Campani (Capanus), Bishop of Ferentino (1603);
- Pirro Imperoli, Bishop of Jesi (1604);
- Taddeo Sarti, Bishop of Nepi e Sutri (1604);
- Giuseppe Saladino, Bishop of Siracusa (1604);
- Alessandro di Sangro, Titular Patriarch of Alexandria (1604);
- Ascanio Colonna, Cardinal-Bishop of Palestrina (1606);
- Marcello Lante della Rovere, Bishop of Todi (1607);
- Pompeio Arrigoni, Archbishop of Benevento (1607);
- Anselmo Marzato, Archbishop of Chieti (1607);
- Giovanni Doria (Giannettino), Titular Archbishop of Thessalonica (1608);
- Francesco Vendramin, Patriarch of Venice (1608);
- Lanfranco Margotti, Bishop of Viterbo e Tuscania (1609);
- Scipione Caffarelli-Borghese, Archbishop of Bologna (1610);
- Felice Centini, Bishop of Mileto (1611);
- Gregorio Petrocchini, Cardinal-Bishop of Palestrina (1611);
- Benedetto Giustiniani, Cardinal-Bishop of Palestrina (1612);
- Agostino Galamini, Bishop of Recanati e Loreto (1613);
- Francesco Maria Bourbon Del Monte Santa Maria, Cardinal-Bishop of Palestrina (1615);
- Ferdinando Taverna, Bishop of Novara (1615);
- Francesco Sforza, Cardinal-Bishop of Albano (1618);
- Alessandro Damasceni Peretti, Cardinal-Bishop of Albano (1620);

and the principal co-consecrator of:

- Franz Seraph von Dietrichstein, Archbishop of Olomouc (1599);
- Fernando Niño de Guevara, Titular Archbishop of Philippi (1599);
- Pedro de Deza Manuel, Cardinal-Bishop of Albano (1600);
- Paolo Emilio Zacchia, Bishop of Corneto e Montefiascone (1601);
- Roberto Francesco Romolo Bellarmino, Archbishop of Capua (1602);
- Bonviso Bonvisi, Archbishop of Bari-Canosa (1602); and
- Simeone Tagliavia d'Aragonia, Cardinal-Bishop of Albano (1602).

== See also ==
- Borghese
- Cardinals created by Paul V
- Flight of the Earls

== Sources ==
- Dalton, Jessica (2019). "The Politics of Conversion: Antonio Possevino SJ, Rome and the Conversion of the Family of the French Ambassador to Venice (1601–1607)". Archivum Historicum Societatis Iesu. 88, fasc. 175: 3–48.
- Giordano, Silvano (2014). "PAOLO V, papa". Dizionario Biografico degli Italiani (in Italian). Treccani.

Catholic Church titles
Preceded by Leo XI	Pope; 16 May 1605 – 28 January 1621	Succeeded by Gregory XV
