= Roman Catholic Diocese of Strongoli =

The Diocese of Strongoli was a Roman Catholic diocese in Italy, located in the city of Strongoli, Calabria. In 1818 it was suppressed by Pope Pius VII's bull De utiliori. The territory was subsequently absorbed into the Diocese of Cariati.

== History ==
- 546: Established as Diocese of Strongoli
- June 27, 1818: Suppressed (merged into Archdiocese of Santa Severina)
- 1969: Restored as Titular Episcopal See of Strongoli

== Bishops ==
=== Diocese of Strongoli ===
==== to 1600 ====
...

- Domenico Rossi (bishop) (1433–1470 Died)
- Nicola Balistari (1470–1479 Died)
- Giovanni di Castello (1479–1486 Appointed, Bishop of Carinola)
- Giovanni Antonio Gotti (1486–1496 Died)
- Girolamo Lusco (1496–1509 Died)
- Gaspare de Murgiis (1509–1534 Died)
- Girolamo Grimaldi (1534–1535 Resigned)
- Pietro Ranieri (1535–1541 Resigned)
- Girolamo Zacconi (1541–1558 Resigned)
- Matteo Zacconi (1558–1565 Died)
- Tommaso Orsini (1566–1568 Appointed, Bishop of Foligno)
- Timoteo Giustiniani (1568–1571 Died)
- Gregorio Forbicini (1572–1579 Died)
- Rinaldo Corso (1579–1582 Died)
- Domenico Petrucci (1582–1584 Appointed, Bishop of Bisignano)
- Giovanni Luigi Marescotti (1585–1587 Died)
- Claudio Marescotti, O.S.B. (1587–1590 Died)
- Claudio Vico (1590–1599 Died)
- Marcello Lorenzi (1600–1601 Died)

==== 1600 to 1800 ====
- Sebastiano Ghislieri (1601–1627 Died)
- Bernardino Piccoli (1627–1636 Died)
- Sallustio Bartoli (1636–1637 Died)
- Giulio Diotallevi (1637–1638 Died)
- Carlo Diotallevi (1639–1652 Died)
- Martino Denti de' Cipriani, B. (1652–1655 Died)
- Biagio Mazzella, O.P. (1655–1663 Appointed, Bishop of Sant'Agata de' Goti)
- Antonio Maria Camalda (1663–1690 Died)
- Giovanni Battista Carrone (1691–1706 Died)
- Tommaso Olivieri (1706–1719 Died)
- Domenico de Marzano (1719–1735 Appointed, Bishop of Bova)
- Gaetano d'Arco (1735–1741 Appointed, Bishop of Nusco)
- Ferdinando Mandarini (1741–1748 Appointed, Bishop of Oppido Mamertina)
- Domenico Morelli (1748–1792 Resigned)
- Pasquale Petruccelli (1793–1798 Died)

1818: Suppressed; territory transferred to the Diocese of Cariati

=== Titular Bishops of Strongoli ===
- Nicolas Verhoeven, M.S.C. (1969 –1976 Resigned)
- Olavio López Duque, O.A.R. (1977–2013 Died)

Barthol Barretto, is the Auxiliary of Archdiocese of Bombay (from 2016 onwards)
