= Diocese of Jesi =

Roman Catholic diocese in Italy

Coordinates: 43.3561°N 13.2439°E

Diocese of Jesi Dioecesis Aesina Diocesi di Jesi

Catholic
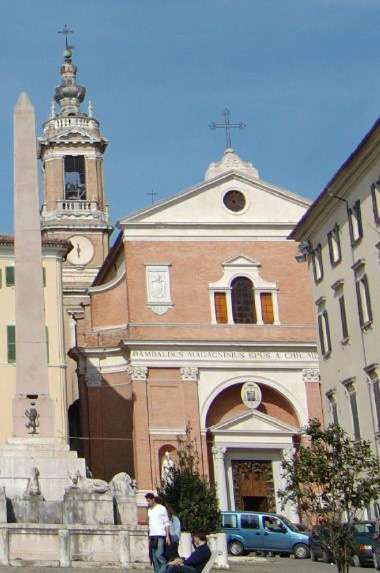
- Cathedral in Jesi

Location
- Country: Italy
- Ecclesiastical province: Ancona-Osimo
- Headquarters: Jesi, Marche, Italy

Statistics
- Area: 315 km^{2} (122 sq mi)
- Population: Total; Catholics: (as of 2023); 75,700; 65,500 (86.5%)
- Parishes: 40

Information
- Denomination: Catholic Church
- Sui iuris church: Latin Church
- Rite: Roman Rite
- Established: 6th Century
- Cathedral: Basilica Cattedrale di S. Settimio
- Patron saint: Septimius of Iesi
- Secular priests: 41 (diocesan); 11 (Religious Orders); 12 Permanent Deacons

Current leadership
- Pope: Leo XIV
- Bishop: Paolo Ricciardi
- Metropolitan Archbishop: Angelo Spina
- Bishops emeritus: Gerardo Rocconi

Map
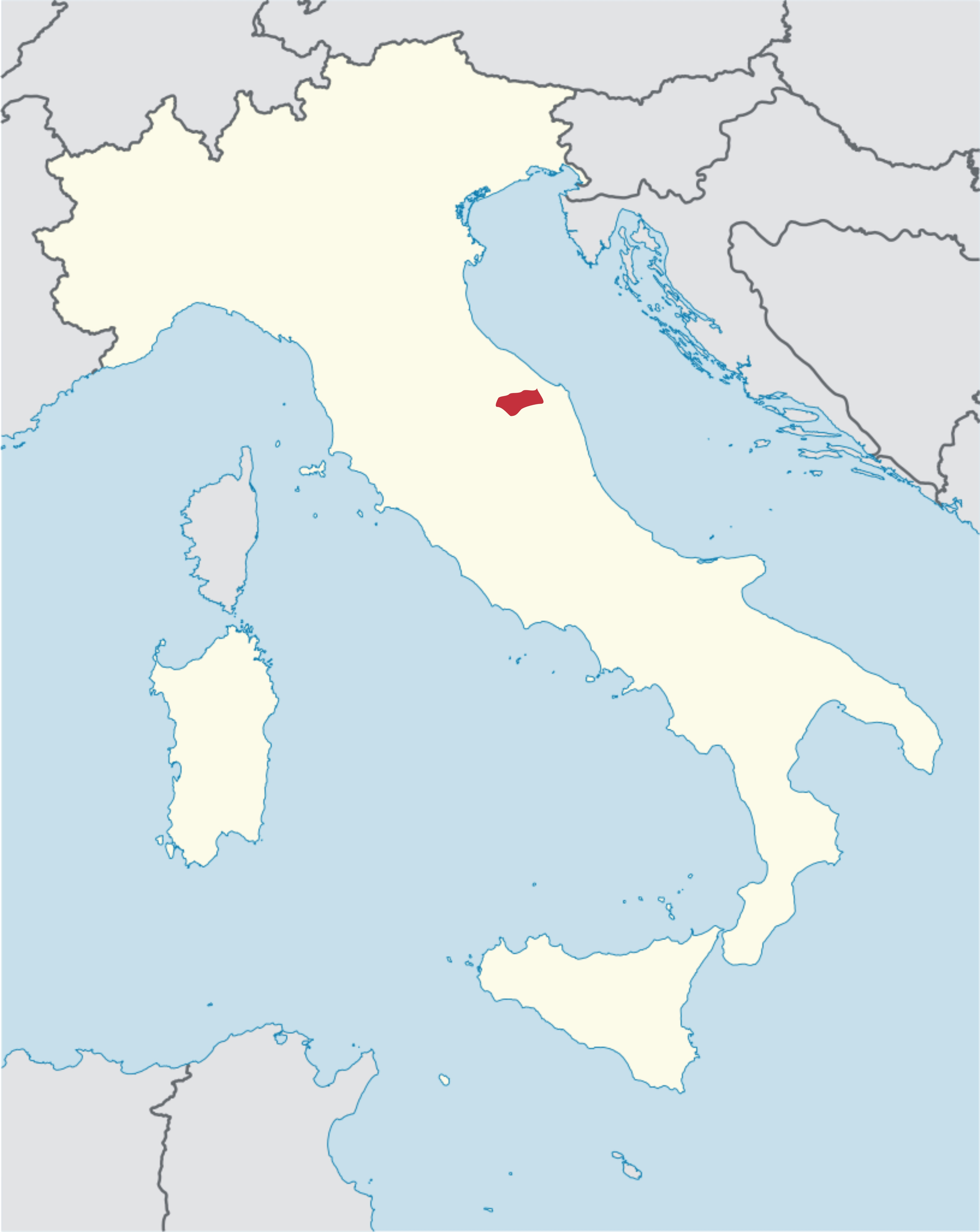

Website
- Diocesi di Jesi (in Italian)

The Diocese of Jesi (Latin: Dioecesis Aesina) is a Latin Church diocese of the Catholic Church in the Marche, Italy. It is a suffragan of the archdiocese of Ancona-Osimo.

== History ==
Saint Septimius, supposedly martyred in 307, has been venerated as the first bishop of Jesi since the 15th century. Saint Florianus, who was cast into the Esino in the Diocletian persecution, is also venerated (perhaps he is confounded with Saint Florianus who was cast into the Enus or Anisus). Other bishops of antiquity were Calumniosus (c. 647) and Honestus. Their relics were discovered in 1623.

The future emperor Frederick II was born in Jesi on 26 December 1194. His mother, Constance, Queen of Sicily, was on her way to join her husband, Henry VI, who had been crowned King of Sicily at Palermo on the previous day. At Jesi she was overcome by sudden labor pains, and, anticipating the birth of an heir, the people erected a pavilion for her in the town square, so that the birth might take place amid a large complement of witnesses. Fifteen cardinals and bishops witnessed the birth of the baby Frederick.

On 30 May 1247, Pope Innocent IV rejected the election of one of the Canons of the Cathedral Chapter, Armannus, as bishop of Jesi, on the grounds that the Canons were excommunicated due to their support of the Emperor Frederick II. One Canon, however, named Montanario, was loyal to the Holy See and had escaped to Ancona from Jesi; he notified the Pope that he elected the Franciscan Gualterio. Innocent ordered the Rector of the March of Ancona, Marcellino Aretino, and Bishop Philip of Fermo to investigate the election and consult with Canon Montanario, and provide the new bishop. The Franciscan Gualtiero, an Englishman, was appointed. He was a friend of John of Parma, general of the order and patron of the Franciscan Spirituals.

Bishop Severinus in 1237 laid the foundations of the new cathedral; the old cathedral, dedicated to Saint Nicholas of Myra, was outside the city, and in the eighteenth century had fallen into ruin. In its current form, the cathedral is the result of restorations and renovations carried out by Bishop Antonio Fonseca.

The cathedral was and is administered by a Chapter, composed of a Prior and ten Canons. Up until the middle of the 15th century the Canons were required to live in the Canonica, unless individually dispensed. Pope Paul II (1464–1471) dispensed the Canons from this obligation. The best-known of the Canons was Marcello Cervini, who became Pope Marcellus II (1555).

Gabriele del Monte (1554) introduced the reforms of the Council of Trent, which he had attended. His successors were Cardinal Camillo Borghese (1597), afterwards Pope Paul V; Cardinals Tiberio Cenci (1621) and Alderano Cybo (1656), noted for their benefactions; Bishop Antonio Fonseca (1724), who founded a hospital. Cardinal Caprara, afterwards Archbishop of Milan, who concluded the Concordat with Napoleon, was Bishop of Jesi (1800–02). He was succeeded by Antonio Odescalchi, who was deported to Milan by the French in 1809, dying in exile in Cesano Boscone in 1812.

On 15 August 1972, by the Bull Qui apostolico officio, Pope Paul VI created the new ecclesiastical province of Ancona, and granted its archbishop the status of Metropolitan. The ecclesiastical province was assigned the suffragan dioceses of Jesi (Aesina) and Osimo (Auximana).

=== Synods ===
A diocesan synod was an irregularly held, but important, meeting of the bishop of a diocese and his clergy. Its purpose was (1) to proclaim generally the various decrees already issued by the bishop; (2) to discuss and ratify measures on which the bishop chose to consult with his clergy; (3) to publish statutes and decrees of the diocesan synod, of the provincial synod, and of the Holy See.

Bishop Marco Agrippa Dandini (1599–1603) held a diocesan synod in Jesi on 16 September 1600. Bishop Tiberio Cenci (1621–1653) held a synod on 10 May 1626, and, as Cardinal, another synod on 23 September 1649. Cardinal Alderano Cybo (1656–1671) held a diocesan synod in Jesi from 4 to 6 July 1658. Cardinal Pietro Matteo Petrucci held his first diocesan synod on 26—28 April 1683. He held his second diocesan synod in Jesi on 21 March 1695.

On 23 April 1708, Bishop Alessandro Fedele (1696–1715) held a diocesan synod, whose decisions were published in 1713. Bishop Antonio Fonseca held a diocesan synod in the Cathedral on 25 to 27 May 1727. The synodal decrees were published. He held a second diocesan synod on 26 and 27 September 1741, and its constitutions too were published. From 14 June to 16 June 1772, Bishop Ubaldo Baldassini, B. (1764–1786) held a diocesan synod, and published its synodal constitutions.

Cardinal Carlo Luigi Morichini (1854–1871) presided over a diocesan synod on 15—17 November 1857.

Bishop Oscar Serfilippi (1978–2006) held a diocesan synod in Jesi on 24 January 1982.

== Bishops of Jesi ==
=== to 1100 ===
...
? Septimius
...
[Martianus (501)]
...

- Calompiosus (c. 647)
- Honestus (attested 680)
- Petrus (attested 743)

...

- Anastasius (attested 853)

...

- Eberhard (attested 967)

...
[Martianus (attested 1027)]
...

=== from 1100 to 1500 ===
- Raynaldus (1164–1175)
- Grimoaldus
- Crescentius (attested 1207)
- Philippus
- Severinus (attested 1230, 1235, 1237)

Armannus (Hermannus)

- Gualterus, O.Min.
- Crescentius (1252–1263)
- Bonajuncta, O.Min. (1263–1267)
- Hugo (1267– )
- Ioannes (1289–1295)
- Leonardus (1295–1311)
- Francesco Alfani (1312–1342)
- Francesco Jordani Brancaleoni (1342–1350)
- Nicolaus de Pisis, O.E.S.A. (1350–c. 1370)
- Giovanni Zeminiani Rizardi, O.P. (1371–1373)
- Berardus de Beysiaco, O.E.S.A. (1373–1391?)
- ? Pietro Borghese (? attested c. 1380)
- Tommaso Pierleone (1391–1400)
- Ludovico (Aloysius) Francisci Alfani (1400–1405)
- Jacobus Bonriposi (1405–1418)
- Blondus Conchi (1418– )
- Lazarus ( ? –1425)
- Innocenzo de Comite (30 May 1425 – 1443)

...

- Thomas Ghisleri (5 Oct 1463 –1505)

=== from 1500 to 1800 ===
- Angelo Ripanti (1505–1513)
- Pietro Paolo Venanzio (1513–1519)
- Antonio de Spello (1519–1540)
- Benedetto Conversini (1540–1553)
- Gabriele Del Monte (10 Nov 1554 – 27 Apr 1597 Died)
- Camillo Borghese (1597–1599)
- Marco Agrippa Dandini (1599–1603 Died)
- Pirro Imperoli (1604–1617)
- Marcello Pignatelli, C.R. (13 Nov 1617 – 1621 Died)
- Tiberio Cenci (1621–1653)
- Cardinal Giacomo Corradi (21 Apr 1653 – Apr 1656 Resigned)
- Alderano Cibo (24 Apr 1656 – 10 Dec 1671 Resigned)
- Lorenzo Cibo (Cybo) (18 Jan 1671 – 17 Aug 1680 Died)
- Pier Matteo Petrucci, C.O. (14 Apr 1681 –1695/1696)
- Alessandro Fedele (20 Feb 1696 – 7 Apr 1715 Died)
- Francesco Antonio Giattini (7 Dec 1716 – 27 Sep 1724 Resigned)
- Antonio Fonseca (20 Dec 1724 – 9 Dec 1763 Died)
- Ubaldo Baldassini, B. (1764–1786)

Sede vacante (1786–1794)

- Cardinal Giovanni Battista Bussi de Pretis (1794–1800)

=== since 1800 ===
- Cardinal Giovanni Battista Caprara (11 Aug 1800 – 24 May 1802)
- Antonio Maria Odescalchi (28 May 1804 – 23 Jul 1812 Died)

Sede vacante (1812–1817)

- Cardinal Francesco Cesarei Leoni (28 Jul 1817 – 25 Jul 1830 Died)
- Francesco Tiberi Contigliano (2 Jul 1832 – 18 May 1836 Resigned)
- Cardinal Pietro Ostini (1836–1841)
- Cardinal Silvestro Belli (1842–1844)
- Cardinal Cosimo Corsi (1845–1853)
- Cardinal Carlo Luigi Morichini (23 Jun 1854 –1871)
- Rambaldo Magagnini (1872–1892)
- Aurelio Zonghi (12 Jun 1893 – 9 Jan 1902 Resigned)
- Giovanni Battista Ricci (9 Jun 1902 – 21 Jul 1906 Appointed, Archbishop of Ancona e Numana)
- Giuseppe Gandolfi (1 Dec 1906 – 14 Sep 1927 Died)
- Goffredo Zaccherini (15 Jun 1928 – 11 May 1934 Resigned)
- Carlo Falcinelli (6 Sep 1934 – 6 Nov 1952 Resigned)
- Giovanni Battista Pardini (7 Jan 1953 – 30 Apr 1975 Resigned)
- Oscar Serfilippi, O.F.M. Conv. (1 Mar 1978 – 20 Mar 2006 Retired)
- Gerardo Rocconi (20 Mar 2006 – 28 Jan 2025 Retired)
- Paolo Ricciardi (28 Jan 2025 – Present)

== Bibliography ==
=== Reference works for bishops ===
- Gams, Pius Bonifatius (1873). Series episcoporum Ecclesiae catholicae: quotquot innotuerunt a beato Petro apostolo (in Latin). Ratisbon: Typis et Sumptibus Georgii Josephi Manz. pp. 700–701.
- Eubel, Conradus; Gulik, Guilelmus (1923). Hierarchia catholica (in Latin). Vol. Tomus 3 (second ed.). Münster: Libreria Regensbergiana.
- Gauchat, Patritius (Patrice) (1935). Hierarchia catholica. Vol. Tomus IV (1592-1667). Münster: Libraria Regensbergiana.
- Ritzler, Remigius; Sefrin, Pirminus (1952). Hierarchia catholica medii et recentis aevi. Vol. Tomus V (1667-1730). Patavii: Messagero di S. Antonio.
- Ritzler, Remigius; Sefrin, Pirminus (1958). Hierarchia catholica medii et recentis aevi. Vol. Tomus VI (1730-1799). Patavii: Messagero di S. Antonio.
- Ritzler, Remigius; Sefrin, Pirminus (1968). Hierarchia Catholica medii et recentioris aevi (in Latin). Vol. VII (1800–1846). Monasterii: Libreria Regensburgiana.
- Remigius Ritzler; Pirminus Sefrin (1978). Hierarchia catholica Medii et recentioris aevi (in Latin). Vol. VIII (1846–1903). Il Messaggero di S. Antonio.
- Pięta, Zenon (2002). Hierarchia catholica medii et recentioris aevi (in Latin). Vol. IX (1903–1922). Padua: Messagero di San Antonio. ISBN 978-88-250-1000-8.

=== Studies ===
- Baldassini, Girolamo (1765). Memorie istoriche dell'antichissima e regia città di Jesi (in Italian). Jesi: Pietropaolo Bonelli. pp. 361–382.
- Cappelletti, Giuseppe (1848). Le chiese d'Italia della loro origine sino ai nostri giorni (in Italian). Vol. settimo. Venezia: G. Antonelli. pp. 271–320.
- Lanzoni, Francesco (1927). Le diocesi d'Italia dalle origini al principio del secolo VII (an. 604). Faenza: F. Lega, pp. 490–492. (in Italian)
- Mezzadri, L; Tagliaferri, M; Guerriero, E. (eds) (2008), Le diocesi d'Italia Volume III (Torino, San Paolo edizioni, 2008). (in Italian)
- Stefani, G. (1856). Dizionario corografico dello Stato Pontificio (in Italian). Milano e Verona: Presso gli Stabilimenti di Civelli G. e C. pp. 506–515.
- Ughelli, Ferdinando; Coleti, Niccolò (1717). Italia sacra, sive De Episcopis Italiae (in Latin). Vol. Tomus primus (secunda ed.). Venice: apud Sebastianum Coleti. pp. 279–287.
