= Strongoli =

Strongoli Griko: Strongylón
- Comune
- Comune di Strongoli
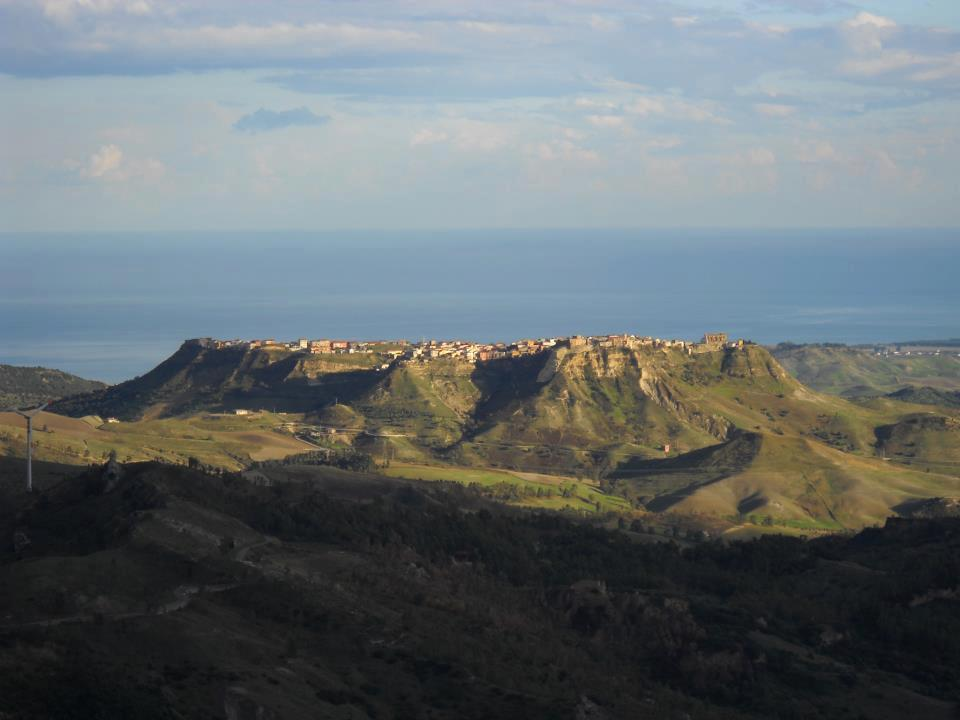

- Location within Italy Location within Calabria
- Coordinates: 39°16′N 17°03′E
- Country: Italy
- Region: Calabria
- Province: Crotone (KR)
- Frazioni: Trepido

Area
  - Total: 78 km^{2} (30 sq mi)
- Elevation: 1 m (3.3 ft)

Population (December 31, 2004)
  - Total: 5,525
  - Density: 71/km^{2} (180/sq mi)
- Demonym: Strongolesi
- Time zone: UTC+1 (CET)
  - Summer (DST): UTC+2 (CEST)
- Postal code: 88815
- Dialing code: 0962

Strongoli is a comune and town with a population of over 6000 people in the province of Crotone, in Calabria, southernmost Italy.

== History ==
In Antiquity, Strongoli was the site of Petelia, said to have been founded by Philoctetes. It is the birthplace of Italian baroque composer Leonardo Vinci.

== Ecclesiastical History ==
Some historians claim that Ancient Petelia already was a bishopric, established perhaps in 546 or then adopting the city's new medieval name Strongoli, but without solid evidence, and the see in never mentioned in the Byzantine imperial Notitia Episcopatuum of the Patriarchate of Constantinople, which most dioceses in Calabria belonged to in the 9th till 11th centuries, so its foundation may rather date from the Normans, probably late 12th century.

The first historical record of the Diocese of Strongoli (Curiate Italian) / Strongulen(sis) (Latin adjective) is a papal bulla from Pope Lucius III in 1183, naming it among the suffragans of the Archdiocese of Santa Severina (while confirming the Metropolitan's privileges).

The tiny bishopric, comprising solely the municipality of Strongoli, was confined by the Ionian Sea, Diocese of Crotone (separated by the river Neto), the Diocese of Umbriatico and its Metropolitan, the Archdiocese of Santa Severina.

Its Cathedral was the Church of Peter and Paul (chiesa dei Santi Pietro e Paolo), the episcopal city's only parish.

Yet between the 14th and 16th centuries, the diocese harbored a monastery of the Conventual Friars Minor (Santa Maria delle Grazie), an Augustinian convent (Santa Maria del Popolo), a Capuchin monastery (San Francesco d'Assisi) and some fifteen churches and chapels.

On 1818.06.27 the see was suppressed, its territory being merged into the then Diocese of Cariati.

=== Residential Ordinaries ===
(all Roman Rite)

incomplete : first centuries lacking
Suffragan Bishops of Strongoli

- Madio ? (mentioned in 1178)[7]
- Ireneo =Irenaeus (il 1179)
- Anonymous (bishop(s?) (mentioned in 1215; in 1219; in 1223)[8]
- Wiliam = Guglielmo (in 1246)[9]
- Peter = Pietro I, Benedictine Order (O.S.B.) (30 January 1255 - 1266/1267)[10]
- Johannes = Giovanni (fl. June 1284 - April 1286)

TO ELABORATE from the Italian Wiki

- Ruggero (1282 – 1290.11.11), next Bishop of Rapolla (Italy) (1290.11.11 – 1305)
- Francesco (1291 – death 1297)
- Uguccio, Dominican Order (O.P.) (1297.03.18 – ?)
- Simone (? – ?)
- Ruggero (1322? – ?)
- Pietro (1330.09.10 – 1342)
- Tommaso de Rosa, ?Conventual Friars Minor (O.F.M.) (1342.11.13 – death 1351)
- Alamanno (1351.05.30 – ?)
- Pietro (? – ?)
- Raimondo (? – ?)
- Paolo de’ Medici, ?Conventual O.F.M. (1374.07.14 – ?)
- Vito (1375.09.27 – 1385.04.28); next uncanonical Bishop of Tricarico (Italy) (1385.04.28 – 1399.11), then canonical Bishop of Tricarico (Italy) (1399.11 – death 1403)
- Antonio (1389.06.18 – ?)
- Giacomo (1400.04.28 – 1402.10.09), previously Bishop of Anglona (1399.05.17 – 1400.04.28); later Bishop of Ales (Italy) (1402.10.09 – 1403.08.03), Bishop of Lavello (1403.08.03 – ?)
- Pietro (1407.07.23 – death 1413)
- Antonio de Podio (1418.03.09 – 1429.12.23), previously uncanonical Bishop of Bosa (Italy) (1410.05.23 – 1418.03.09); later Metropolitan Archbishop of Santa Severina (Italy) (1429.12.23 – death 1453)
- Tommaso Rossi (1429.12.23 – death 1433), previously Bishop of Cerenzia (1420.12.23 – 1429.05.18), Bishop of Oppido Mamertina (Italy) (1429.05.18 – 1429.12.23)
- Domenico Rossi (1433.12.14 – death 1470)
- Nicola Balestrari (1470.03.11 – ?)
- Giovanni di Castello (1479.04.21 – 1486.05.10), next Bishop of Carinola (Italy) (1486.05.10 – death 1501?)
- Giovanni Antonio Gotti (1486.05.10 – ?)
- Girolamo Lusco (1496.12.02 – death 1509)
- Gaspare de Murgiis (1509.11.21 – ?)
  - Apostolic Administrator Cardinal Girolamo Grimaldi (1534.05.10 – 1535.11.15), while Cardinal-Deacon of S. Giorgio in Velabro (1528.04.27 – 1543.11.27), Apostolic Administrator of Diocese of Brugnato (Italy) (1528.09.25 – 1535.06.06), Apostolic Administrator of Diocese of Venafro (Italy) (1528.10.09 – 1536.06.02), Apostolic Administrator of Archdiocese of Bari e Canosa (Italy) (1530.09.02 – 1540.08.20); later Apostolic Administrator of Diocese of Albenga (Italy) (1538.11.15 – 1543.11.27)
- Pietro Ranieri (1535.11.15 – ?)
- Girolamo Zacconi (1541.05.20 – 1558.06.15)
- Matteo Zacconi (1558.06.15 – death 1565)
- Tommaso Orsini (1566.08.15 – 1568.01.23), next Bishop of Foligno (Italy) (1568.01.23 – 1576.01.25)
- Timoteo Giustiniani, Dominican Order (O.P.) (1568.04.05 – death 1571); previously last Bishop of Ario (Crete, insular Greece) (1550.06.27 – 1551.10.05), first Bishop of Retimo–Ario (Crete, insular Greece) (1551.10.05 – 1564.04.15), Bishop of Chios (insular Greece) (1564.04.15 – 1568.04.05)
- Gregorio Forbicini (1572.01.23 – death 1579)
- Rinaldo Corso (1579.08.03 – death 1582)
- Domenico Petrucci (1582.04.27 – 1584.07.23), next Bishop of Bisignano (Italy) (1584.07.23 – death 1598)
- Giovanni Luigi Marescotti (1585.01.14 – death 1587.01.03)
- Claudio Marescotti, Benedictine Confederation (O.S.B.) (1587.02.18 – death 1590.02.24)
- Claudio Vico (1590.03.21 – ?)
- Marcello Lorenzi (1600.01.31 – death 1601)
- Sebastiano Ghislieri (1601.04.30 – death 1627.10.02)
- Archbishop-bishop Bernardino Piccoli (1627.10.02 – death 1636), succeeding as former Titular Archbishop of Nicæa (1621.12.15 – 1627.10.02) and Coadjutor Bishop of Strongoli (1621.12.15 – 1627.10.02)
- Sallustio Bartoli (1636.11.10 – death 1637.05)
- Giulio Diotallevi (1637.12.14 – death 1638.09)
- Carlo Diotallevi (1639.05.02 – death 1652.03)
- Martino Denti de’ Cipriani, Barnabites (B.) (1652.08.26 – death 1655)
- Biagio Mazzella, O.P. (1655.10.25 – 1663.02.26), next Bishop of Sant’Agata de’ Goti (Italy) (1663.02.26 – death 1664)
- Antonio Maria Camalda (1663.07.02 – death 1690.12)
- Giovanni Battista Carrone (1691.12.19 – death 1706.04)
- Domenico Marzano (1719.03.28 – 1735.07.27), next Bishop of Bova (Italy) (1735.07.27 – death 1752)
- Gaetano de Arco (1736 – 1741.03.06), next Bishop of Nusco (Italy) (1741.03.06 – death 1753.05.25)
- Ferdinando Mandarani (1741.07.31 – 1748.01.29), next Bishop of Oppido Mamertina (Italy) (1748.01.29 – 1769.11.09)
- Domenico Morelli (1748.01.29 – death 1793?)
- Pasquale Petruccelli (1793.06.17 – death 1796?98)
- Sede vacante (1798 - see suppressed 1818)

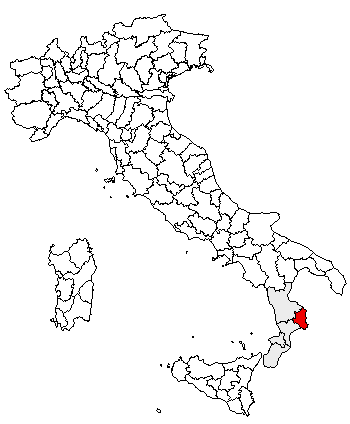

=== Titular see ===
The diocese was nominally restored in 1969 as Titular bishopric of Strongoli (Italian) / Strongulen(sis) (Latin adjective).

It has had the following incumbents, so far of the fitting Episcopal (lowest) rank :

- Nicolaas Verhoeven, Sacred Heart Missionaries (M.S.C.) (1969.06.26 – resigned 1976.09.15) as emeritate, died 1981; previously Titular Bishop of Hermonthis (1947.03.13 – 1961.01.03) as last Apostolic Vicar of Manado (Indonesia) (1947.03.13 – 1961.01.03), (see) promoted first Bishop of Manado (Indonesia) (1961.01.03 – 1969.06.26)
- Olavio López Duque, Augustinian Recollects (O.A.R.) (1977.05.30 – death 2013.06.11) as Apostolic Vicar of Casanare (Colombia) (1977.05.30 – 1999.10.29), as Apostolic Administrator of Diocese of Yopal (Colombia) (1999.10.29 – 2001.06.22) and on emeritate
- Barthol Barretto (2016.12.20 – ...), Auxiliary Bishop of Archdiocese of Bombay (India) (2016.12.20 – ...).

== Economy ==
Strongoli relies on the production of oil, wine, cereals, citruses and intensive cattle breeding.

== See also ==
- List of Catholic dioceses in Italy
- Diocese of Strongile on Lesbos, insular Greece, also a Latin titular see

== Sources and external links ==
- GCatholic
- Beweb - Rossano-Cariati diocese

Bibliography

- Ferdinando Ughelli, Italia sacra, vol. IX, second edition, Venice 1721, coll. 516–525
- Vincenzio d'Avino, Cenni storici sulle chiese arcivescovili, vescovili e prelatizie (nullius) del Regno delle Due Sicilie, Naples 1848, pp. 141–142
- Giuseppe Cappelletti, Le chiese d'Italia della loro origine sino ai nostri giorni, vol. XXI, Venice 1870, pp. 263–267
- Domenico Taccone-Gallucci, Regesti dei Romani Pontefici per le chiese della Calabria, Rome 1902, pp. 446–447
- Andrea Pesavento, La chiesa dei SS. Pietro e Paolo di Strongoli da Cattedrale a Collegiata, published in La Provincia KR nr. 8-10/1998
- Paul Fridolin Kehr, Italia Pontificia, X, Berlin 1975, p. 135
- Norbert Kamp, Kirche und Monarchie im staufischen Königreich Sizilien, vol 2, Prosopographische Grundlegung: Bistümer und Bischöfe des Königreichs 1194 - 1266; Apulien und Kalabrien, Monaco 1975, pp. 908–910
- Pius Bonifacius Gams, Series episcoporum Ecclesiae Catholicae, Leipzig 1931, pp. 927–928
- Konrad Eubel, Hierarchia Catholica Medii Aevi, vol. 1, p. 465; vol. 2, p. 242; vol. 3, pp. 304–305; vol. 4, p. 323; vol. 5, p. 364; vol. 6, p. 387
- Bulla De utiliori, in Bullarii romani continuatio, Vol. XV, Rome 1853, pp. 56–61
