= Campania (Catholic ecclesiastical region) =

The ecclesiastical region of Campania is one of the sixteen ecclesiastical regions of the Catholic Church in Italy. It consists of three ecclesiastical provinces, twenty-two dioceses, one territorial prelature, and two territorial abbeys. Its territory roughly corresponds with the Italian Republic homonymous region's one.

== The ecclesiastical region today ==
=== Statistics ===
Area (km^{2}): 13.879
Inhabitants: 5.911.843
Parishes: 1.821
Number of secular priests: 2261
Number of regular priests: 1307
Number of permanent deacons: 489

=== Subdivision ===
This ecclesiastical region is made up of twenty-five dioceses:

- Metropolitan Archdiocese of Naples (ecclesiastical province), whose suffragan districts are:
  - Diocese of Acerra
  - Diocese of Alife-Caiazzo
  - Diocese of Aversa
  - Archdiocese of Capua
  - Diocese of Caserta
  - Diocese of Ischia
  - Diocese of Nola
  - Territorial Prelature of Pompei
  - Diocese of Pozzuoli
  - Diocese of Sessa Aurunca
  - Archdiocese of Sorrento-Castellammare di Stabia
  - Diocese of Teano-Calvi
- Metropolitan Archdiocese of Benevento (ecclesiastical province), whose suffragan districts are:
  - Diocese of Ariano Irpino-Lacedonia
  - Diocese of Avellino
  - Diocese of Cerreto Sannita-Telese-Sant'Agata de' Goti
  - Territorial Abbey of Montevergine
  - Archdiocese of Sant'Angelo dei Lombardi-Conza-Nusco-Bisaccia
- Metropolitan Archdiocese of Salerno-Campagna-Acerno (ecclesiastical province), whose suffragan ecclesiastical districts are:
  - Archdiocese of Amalfi-Cava de' Tirreni
  - Territorial Abbey of La Trinità della Cava
  - Diocese of Nocera Inferiore-Sarno
  - Diocese of Teggiano-Policastro
  - Diocese of Vallo della Lucania

=== Episcopal Conference of Campania ===
- President: Cardinal Crescenzio Sepe, Archbishop of Naples
- Vice President: Luigi Moretti, Archbishop of Salerno-Campagna-Acerno
- Secretary: Antonio Di Donna, Bishop of Acerra
