= Padoin =

Padoin (Italian: [padoˈin], Venetian: [padoˈiŋ]) is an Italian surname that may refer to the following notable people:

- Nicola Padoin (born 1979), Italian football midfielder
- Silvio Padoin (1930–2019), Italian Roman Catholic bishop
- Simone Padoin (born 1984), Italian football player
- Licerio Vicente Padoin (born 1963), Brazilian doctor, professor end researcher
