= Gerardo Pierro =

Italian ordinary of the Catholic Church (1935–2025)

His Excellency, The Most Reverend Gerardo Pierro
- Archbishop Emeritus of Salerno-Campagna-Acerno; Primate of the Kingdom of Naples
- Archdiocese: Salerno-Campagna-Acerno
- Appointed: 25 May 1992
- Term ended: 10 June 2010
- Predecessor: Guerino Grimaldi
- Successor: Luigi Moretti
- Other post: Primate of the Kingdom of Naples
- Previous posts: Bishop of Tursi-Lagonegro (1981–1987); Bishop of Avellino (1987–1992)

Orders
- Ordination: 21 December 1957
- Consecration: 2 August 1981 by Sebastiano Cardinal Baggio

Personal details
- Born: 26 April 1935 Mercato San Severino, Italy
- Died: 24 February 2025 (aged 89) Pontecagnano Faiano, Italy
- Denomination: Roman Catholic

Gerardo Pierro (26 April 1935 – 24 February 2025) was an Italian ordinary of the Catholic Church. He served as the Bishop of Tursi-Lagonegro, as the Bishop of Avellino, and as the Archbishop of Salerno-Campagna-Acerno. In this last role, he simultaneously held the title of Primate of the Kingdom of Naples..

== Biography ==
After studying at the Archdiocesan Seminary of Salerno and the Pontifical Regional Seminary in Salerno, Pierro was ordained a priest by Demetrio Moscato, Archbishop of Salerno, on 21 December 1957.

On 14 August 1960, he was appointed a parish priest of the Church of San Nicola di Bari in Coperchia di Pellezzano, where he remained until 6 September 1981 when he became Bishop of Tursi-Lagonegro. On 18 November 1974, Pierro received a degree in theology from Pontificia Facoltà Teologica "S. Luigi" (the Pontifical Theological Faculty "San Luigi") in the Posillipo quarter of Naples. He then taught religion at the "G. Da Procida" high school in Salerno and dogmatic theology at the Pontifical Seminary of Salerno's Institute of Religious Sciences.

He was then diocesan president of the Apostolic Union of the Clergy, regional vice delegate, and national counselor of the same organization.

Pierro died on 24 February 2025, at the age of 89.

=== Episcopal ministry ===
On 26 June 1981, Pierro was elected Bishop of Tursi-Lagonegro, receiving his episcopal consecration from Cardinal Sebastiano Baggio on 2 August in the Salerno Cathedral. He was then elected Bishop of Avellino on 28 February 1987. On 25 May 1992, he was promoted to Metropolitan Archbishop of Salerno-Campagna-Acerno.

In July 2008, Pierro was delivered a notice of investigation for fraud against the state and misuse of property. In May 2010, he was indicted along with others. Pope Benedict accepted his resignation from pastoral government of the Archdiocese of Salerno-Campagna-Acerno, and called upon Luigi Moretti, the Vicegerent Archbishop of the Diocese of Rome, to succeed him.

Catholic Church titles
Preceded by Vincenzo Franco	Bishop of Tursi-Lagonegro; 1981–1987	Succeeded by Rocco Talucci
Preceded by Pasquale Venezia	Bishop of Avellino; 1987–1992	Succeeded by Antonio Forte
Preceded by Guerino Grimaldi	Archbishop of Salerno-Campagna-Acerno; 1992–2010	Succeeded by Luigi Moretti
Preceded by Guerino Grimaldi	Primate of the Kingdom of Naples; 1992–2010	Succeeded by Luigi Moretti
