= Sergio Melillo =

Italian Catholic bishop

Monsignor Sergio Melillo
- Bishop of Ariano Irpino-Lacedonia
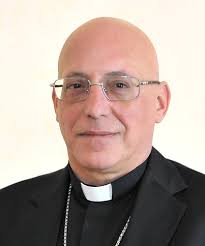
- Melillo in 2018
- Diocese: Diocese of Ariano Irpino-Lacedonia
- Appointed: 23 May 2015
- Predecessor: Giovanni D'Alise

Orders
- Ordination: 9 September 1989 by Francesco Marino
- Consecration: 31 July 2015 by Crescenzio Cardinal Sepe

Personal details
- Born: 16 November 1955 (age 70) Avellino, Italy
- Denomination: Roman Catholic
- Motto: "Misericordiae Vultus Patris Iesus"
- Coat of arms

Sergio Melillo (born 16 November 1955) is a Roman Catholic bishop, being the head of the Diocese of Ariano Irpino-Lacedonia since 2015.

== Biography ==
Melillo was born in Avellino in 1955. After working in public administration during his early 20s, he entered the Pontifical Interregional Seminary in 1983 located in Posillipo (Naples), where he obtained a Licentiate in Dogmatic Theology with emphasis on Ecclesiology.

He was ordained a priest on 9 September 1989, incardinating himself in the diocese of Avellino.

Following his priestly ordination he worked as a parish priest of in the villages of Parolise and Salza Irpina from 1989 to 1994. Following that he was the urban vicar of Avellino from 1994 to 2002. Melillo also served as the deputy director of the diocesan Caritas and was responsible for the organization of volunteers, civil services, and listening centers from 2000 to 2005. During this time he was also a professor of Dogmatic Theology at the Higher Institute of Religious Sciences "San Giuseppe Moscati" in Avellino and Professor of Religious Culture at the University of the Third Age of Avellino. Melillo also served as the parish vicar of the Avellino Cathedral from 1995 up to his appointment as bishop.

Before his appointment as bishop, Melillo would also occasionally teach in high schools. He is the author of some publications of local Ecclesiastical History and of a humanistic, philosophical and literary nature.

Melillo was ordained bishop of Ariano Irpino-Lacedonia on 31 July 2015 by the Archbishop of Naples, Cardinal Crescenzio Sepe. Apostolic nuncio and titular archbishop Adriano Bernardini as well as Giovanni D'Alise, the preceding bishop, served as co-consocrators. Melillo was officially installed as bishop on 9 August 2015.
