= Vice-regent =

Vice-regent may refer to:

- a person who acts for a regent (from Latin regere, "to reign", "to govern")
- a synonym of viceroy
- a common misuse of vicegerent (from Latin gerere, "to carry", "to manage", "to govern")
