= Luigi Moretti (bishop) =

Italian Catholic archbishop (born 1949)

His Excellency, The Most Reverend Luigi Moretti
- Archbishop Emeritus of Salerno-Campagna-Acerno
- Archdiocese: Salerno-Campagna-Acerno
- Appointed: 10 June 2010
- Term ended: 4 May 2019
- Predecessor: Gerardo Pierro
- Successor: Andrea Bellandi
- Other post: Vice President of the Roman Catholic Ecclesiastical Region of Campania
- Previous posts: Archbishop of Salerno-Campagna-Acerno (2010-2019), Vicegerent of the Diocese of Rome (2003–2010), Titular Bishop of Mopta (1998–2010)

Personal details
- Born: 7 February 1949 (age 77) Cittareale, Lazio, Italy
- Denomination: Roman Catholic
- Education: Pontifical Lateran University

Luigi Moretti (born 7 February 1949) is an Italian Catholic archbishop. He was the Archbishop of Salerno-Campagna-Acerno from 2010 to 2019.

== Biography ==
Luigi Moretti was born on 7 February 1949 in the comune of Cittareale in the region of Lazio, Italy.

=== Priestly ministry ===
In 1960, Moretti entered the Pontifical Roman Minor Seminary from which he graduated in 1968. He was ordained a priest at the Pontifical Roman Major Seminary on 30 November 1974 by Cardinal Ugo Poletti.

He then received a bachelor's degree in philosophy from the Pontifical Lateran University and a licentiate in moral theology from the Alphonsian Academy.

From 1974 to 1978, he was Assistant to the Pontifical Roman Major Seminary. From 1976 to 1980, he taught moral theology at the St. Bonaventure Theological Faculty at the Regina Mundi Institute. Between 1978 and 1983, he was parochial vicar in the Parish of St. Lucia.

=== Episcopal ministry ===
Ordination history of Luigi Moretti
History
Priestly ordination
- Ordained by: Ugo Poletti
Episcopal consecration
- Consecrated by: Camillo Ruini

On 3 July 1998, Pope John Paul II appointed Moretti Titular Bishop of Mopta, granting him the position of prelate secretary of the Vicariate of Rome and appointing him an auxiliary bishop of Rome for the central sector of the diocese.

He was consecrated a bishop in the Papal Archbasilica of St. John Lateran on 12 September 1998 by Cardinal Camillo Ruini.

From 17 October 2003, he held the position of Vicegerent of Rome and in 2004, he assumed the role of auxiliary bishop for the eastern sector of the diocese.

Moretti also held the position of ecclesiastical assistant to Pius Sodalizio dei Piceni, was a member of the committee for the foundation of religion and worship of called Istituto Guido and Bice Schillaci Ventura, was on the council for economic affairs of the Diocese of Rome, was the episcopal president of the family and life commission of the Lazio Episcopal Conference, was a member of the family and life commission of the Italian Episcopal Conference, and was the national ecclesiastical assistant to UNITALSI.

On 10 June 2010, he was appointed Archbishop of Salerno-Campagna-Acerno. Additionally, he took the title ex officio of Primate of the Kingdom of Naples.

Catholic Church titles
Preceded by Geoffrey Francis Mayne	— TITULAR — Bishop of Mopta; 1998–2010	Succeeded by Christopher James Coyne
Preceded by —	Auxiliary Bishop of Rome; 1998—2003	Succeeded by —
Preceded by Cesare Nosiglia	Vicegerent of the Diocese of Rome; 2003–2010	Succeeded by Filippo Iannone
Preceded by Gerardo Pierro	Archbishop of Salerno-Campagna-Acerno; 2010–2019	Succeeded by Andrea Bellandi
Preceded by Gerardo Pierro	Primate of the Kingdom of Naples; 2010–2019	Succeeded by Andrea Bellandi
