= Simeone de' Vernacoli =

Catholic prelate

Most Reverend Simeone de' Vernacoli
- Bishop of Pozzuoli
- Church: Catholic Church
- Diocese: Diocese of Pozzuoli
- In office: 1515–1537
- Predecessor: Bernardo Dovizi da Bibbiena
- Successor: Carlo Borromeo (bishop)

Personal details
- Died: 1537 Pozzuoli, Italy

Simeone de' Vernacoli (died 1537) was a Roman Catholic prelate who served as Bishop of Pozzuoli (1515–1537).

== Biography ==
On 6 July 1515, Simeone de' Vernacoli was appointed during the papacy of Pope Leo X as Bishop of Pozzuoli. He served as Bishop of Pozzuoli until his death in 1537.

== External links and additional sources ==
- Cheney, David M. "Diocese of Pozzuoli". Catholic-Hierarchy.org. (for Chronology of Bishops)^{self-published}
- Chow, Gabriel. "Diocese of Pozzuoli". GCatholic.org. (for Chronology of Bishops)^{self-published}

Catholic Church titles
Preceded by Bernardo Dovizi da Bibbiena	Bishop of Pozzuoli; 1515–1537	Succeeded by Carlo Borromeo (bishop)
