= Archdiocese of Salerno-Campagna-Acerno =

Latin Catholic archdiocese in Italy

Coordinates: 40.6833°N 14.7667°E

Archdiocese of Salerno-Campagna-Acerno Archidioecesis Salernitana-Campaniensis-Acernensis

Catholic
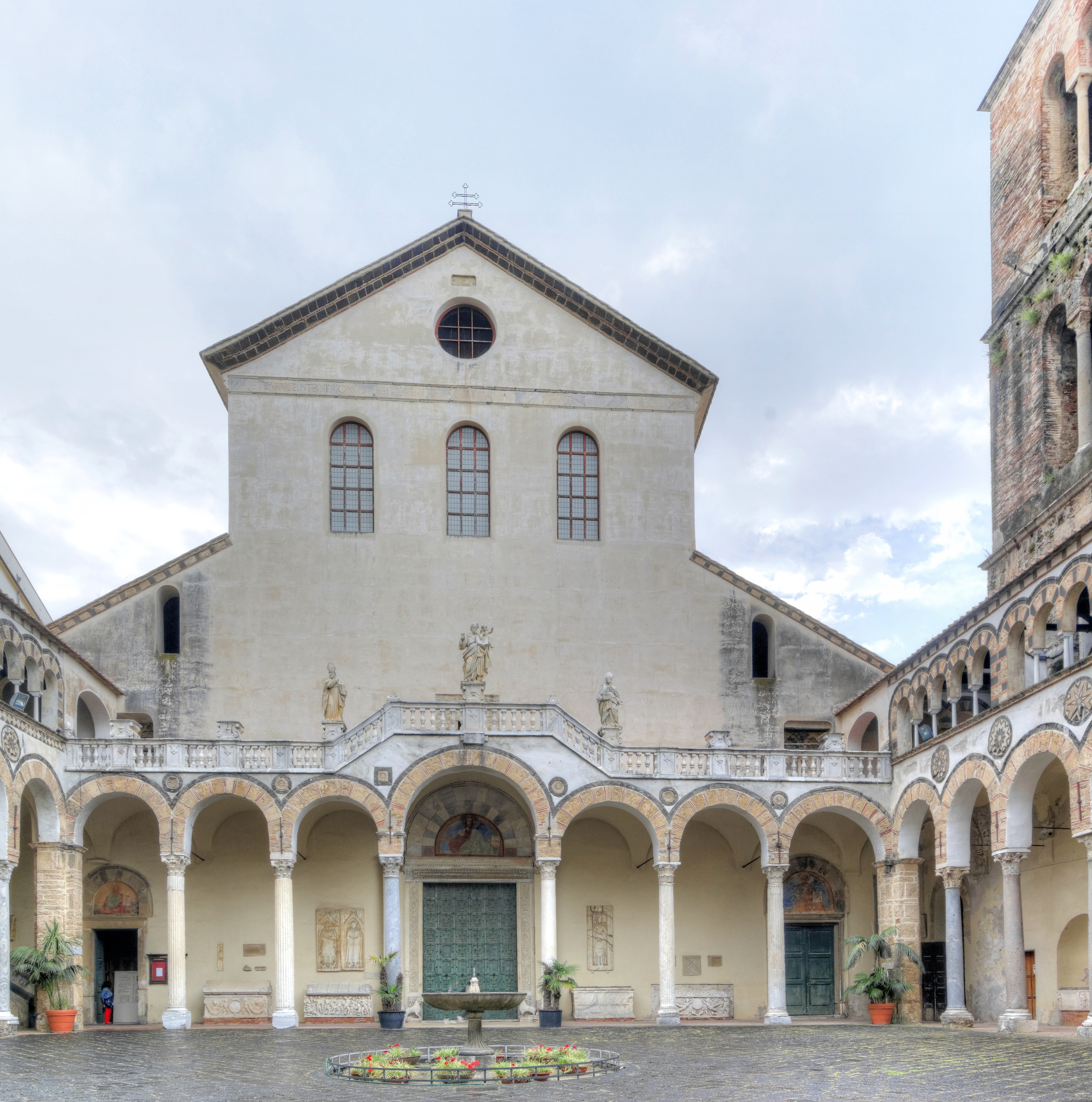
- Salerno Cathedral

Location
- Country: Italy
- Ecclesiastical province: Salerno-Campagna-Acerno

Statistics
- Area: 1,398 km^{2} (540 sq mi)
- Population: Total; Catholics: (as of 2023); 547,000 (guess) ▼; 545,000 (guess) ▼
- Parishes: 163 ▲

Information
- Denomination: Catholic Church
- Sui iuris church: Latin Church
- Rite: Roman Rite
- Established: 6th century
- Cathedral: Cattedrale-Basilica di S. Matteo (Salerno)
- Co-cathedral: Concattedrale-Basilica di S. Maria della Pace (Campagna); Concattedrale di S. Donato (Acerno)
- Secular priests: 223 (diocesan) ▼60 (Religious orders) ▼83 Permanent Deacons ▲

Current leadership
- Pope: Leo XIV
- Archbishop: Andrea Bellandi
- Auxiliary Bishops: Alfonso Raimo
- Bishops emeritus: Luigi Moretti

Website
- www.diocesisalerno.it

The Archdiocese of Salerno-Campagna-Acerno (Latin: Archidioecesis Salernitana-Campaniensis-Acernensis) is a Latin Church diocese of the Catholic Church in Campania, southern Italy, created in 1986. The historic Archdiocese of Salerno was in existence from the tenth century, having been elevated from a sixth-century diocese. The Diocese of Acerno was combined with the archdiocese in 1818.

On 4 May 2019, Pope Francis appointed Archbishop Andrea Bellandi, until then the Vicar general of Florence, as Archbishop, succeeding Archbishop Luigi Moretti.

== History ==
Local Salernitan tradition venerates five saints, who are named as the earliest bishops of Salerno: Bonosus (each 14 May), Gramatius (11 October), Verus (23 October), Eusterius (19 October), and Valentinianus (3 November). Their existence, however, is undocumented, and their dates are unknown.

Bishop Gaudentius attended Pope Symmachus' Roman synod of March 499. Bishop Asterius went to Constantinople with Pope Agapitus in 534. Bishop Petrus (834), formerly Bishop of Canosa, who took refuge at Salerno when the Saracens destroyed his capital, and built the Church of San Giovanni Battista.

In the eighth century the city of Salerno was in the power of the Lombard dukes of Benevento. In 984 Salerno became an archiepiscopal see, the first archbishop being Amato.

=== The archbishopric ===
The first archbishop of Salerno was Amatus. This is explicitly stated in a bull of Pope John XV, written for Archbishop Grimoald on 25 March 994, who was named archbishop just as Amatus had been by his predecessors. Pope John's predecessors were John XIV (December 983–August 984), and Benedict VII, who died on 10 July 983. Since Amatus is attested as still being a bishop in April 983, this places the date of the first grant, as Felice Savio argued, to the year 983, between April and July.

On 22 July 1051, Pope Leo IX issued the bull "Officium Sacerdotale", in which he confirmed the metropolitan status of the archbishops of Salerno, and the privilege of ordering and consecrating the bishops of Paestum, Nola, Conza, Cosenza, and Bisignano. On 24 March 1058, Pope Stephen IX issued the bull also called "Officium Sacerdotale", in which he confirmed for the archbishops of Salerno the right of consecrating bishops for (in addition to those named by Pope Leo) Malvito, Policastro, Marsico, Martirano, and Caciano.

On 8 September 1694, the provinces of Salerno, Avellino, and Potenza were struck by a major earthquake. At Capitignano, the parish church was damaged. At Cava de'Tirreni the cathedral was damaged, and the church of S. Francesco lost half of its bell tower. In Salerno itself, the cathedral was damaged, along with the episcopal palace, the church of S. Matteo, and the convent of the Augustinians.

==== Diocesan synods ====
A diocesan synod was an irregularly held, but important, meeting of the bishop of a diocese and his clergy, to which other interested parties might be invited. Its purpose was (1) to proclaim generally the various decrees already issued by the bishop; (2) to discuss and ratify measures on which the bishop chose to consult with his clergy; (3) to publish statutes and decrees of the diocesan synod, of the provincial synod, and of the Holy See.

A diocesan synod was held under the auspices of Archbishop Federico Fregoso (1507–1529) in 1525. In 1564, Archbishop Gaspar Cervantes de Gaeta (1564–1568) held a diocesan synod. Archbishop Marco Antonio Marsilio Colonna (1574–1589) presided over a diocesan synod in Salerno in 1574, and another in 1579. On 16 May 1630, Cardinal Giulio Savelli, Archbishop of Salerno (1630–1642) held a diocesan synod in the cathedral of S. Maria degli Angeli e S. Matteo Evangelista in Salerno. Cardinal Fabrizio Savelli, Archbishop of Salerno (1642–1658) presided over a diocesan synod in 1653. A diocesan synod was held by Archbishop Giovanni de Torres (1658–1662) in 1661. On 1 March 1803, Archbishop Salvatore Spinelli (1797–1805) held a diocesan synod in the cathedral of Salerno.

A provincial synod was held in Salerno by Archbishop Lucio Sanseverino (1612–1623) from 10 to 13 May 1615. In attendance were the bishops of Sarno, Cava, Campagna, Capaccio, Nusco, Acerna, and the Marsi.

=== Right of King of Naples to nominate archbishop ===
Pope Clement VII sent a motu proprio to the Emperor Charles V on 6 July 1524, remarking that Archbishop Fregoso had not resided in the diocese of Salerno for many years; consequently, the diocese was suffering in its spiritual and temporal condition. The pope proposed to place the diocese in the hands of a special nuncio, with the Emperor's consent, until the return of the archbishop to his seat. In the Treaty of Barcelona (29 June 1529), Pope Clement VII confirmed to the Emperor Charles V the fief of the Kingdom of Naples, and in addition the right to name twenty-four of the bishops in that domain, including the seven archbishops, among them the Archbishop of Salerno. Shortly thereafter Fregoso resigned.

=== After Napoleon ===
Following the extinction of the Napoleonic Kingdom of Italy, the Congress of Vienna authorized the restoration of the Papal States and the Kingdom of Naples. Since the French occupation had seen the abolition of many Church institutions in the Kingdom, as well as the confiscation of most Church property and resources, it was imperative that Pope Pius VII and King Ferdinand IV reach agreement on restoration and restitution.

A concordat was finally signed on 16 February 1818, and ratified by Pius VII on 25 February 1818. Ferdinand issued the concordat as a law on 21 March 1818. The re-erection of the dioceses of the kingdom and the ecclesiastical provinces took more than three years. The right of the king to nominate the candidate for a vacant bishopric was recognized, as in the Concordat of 1741, subject to papal confirmation (preconisation). On 27 June 1818, Pius VII issued the bull De Ulteriore, in which he reestablished the metropolitan archbishopric of Salerno, with five suffragan dioceses, the diocese of Capaccio e Vallo, diocese of Policastro, diocese of Potenza e Marsico Nuovo, and diocese of Nusco.

The See of Acerno, which is on record as an independent diocese since 1136, was granted to the archbishop of Salerno as its perpetual administrator. Among its bishops was the Franciscan Antonio Bonito (1493). In 1920, the diocese of Acerno had seven parishes, seven churches, and sixteen secular priests.

On 4 August 1973, the Archbishop of Salerno, Gaetano Pollio (1969–1984) was also named bishop of Campagna. The three dioceses were held aeque principaliter.

=== Diocesan reorganization ===
The Second Vatican Council (1962–1965), in order to ensure that all Catholics received proper spiritual attention, decreed the reorganization of the diocesan structure of Italy and the consolidation of small and struggling dioceses. It also recommended the abolition of anomalous units such as exempt territorial prelatures.

On 18 February 1984, the Vatican and the Italian State signed a new and revised concordat. Based on the revisions, a set of Normae was issued on 15 November 1984, which was accompanied in the next year, on 3 June 1985, by enabling legislation. According to the agreement, the practice of having one bishop govern two separate dioceses at the same time, aeque personaliter, as was the case with Salerno and Acerno, was to be abolished. Instead, the Vatican continued consultations which had begun under Pope John XXIII for the merging of small dioceses, especially those with personnel and financial problems, into one combined diocese. On 30 September 1986, Pope John Paul II ordered that the dioceses of Salerno and Aceno, as well as the diocese of Campagna (which had not been incorporated into the reorganized metropolitanate of Conza), be merged into one diocese with one bishop, with the Latin title Archidioecesis Salernitana-Campaniensis-Acernensis. The seat of the diocese was to be in Salerno, and the cathedral of S. Maria e S. Matteo in Salerno was to serve as the cathedral of the merged dioceses. The cathedral in Acerno and the cathedral in Campagna were to become co-cathedrals, and the cathedral Chapters of Acerno and of Campagna were each to be a Capitulum Concathedralis. There was to be only one diocesan Tribunal, in Salerno, and likewise one seminary, one College of Consultors, and one Priests' Council. The territory of the new diocese was to include the territory of the previous dioceses of Salerno, Acerna, and Campagna.

== Bishops of Salerno ==
Erected: 6th century

...

- Gaudentius (attested 499)

...

- Asterius (attested 536)

...

- Rodopertus (attested 774–787)
- Rodoaldus
- Petrus
- Rattulus
- Maginaldus
- Teupo
- Alone (attested 841)
- Landemario (d. 844)
- Bernardo (d. 860 ?)

Petrus (861)

- Rachenaldo (c. 862)

...

- Petrus (attested 882–917)
- Johannes (attested 925)
- Petrus (attested 936–946)
- Bernardus (attested 954)
- Petrus (attested 958–974)
- Joannes (attested 977–982)

== Archbishops of Salerno ==
Elevated: 10th century

=== to 1500 ===
- Amatus (attested 982–992)

...

- Alfanus (1058–1085)
- Alfanus (1085/1086–1121)
- Romualdus Guarna (1121 Appointed – 21 Jan 1136)
- Guglielmo da Ravenna (1137–1152)
- Romualdo II Guarna (1153–1181)
- Nicolo Agello (1181–1221)

Sede vacante (1222–1225)

- Caesarius of Alagno (1225–63)
- Matthaeus de Porta (1263–1272)

Sede vacante (1272–1286)

- Philippus (1286–1298)
- Guglielmo de' Godoni (1298–1305)

Gui de Collemedio (1306)

- Berardus (1306–1310)
- Isarnus Morlane (1310)
- Robertus Arcofate (1310–1313)
- Onofrio (1313–1320)
- Bertrand de La Tour, O.F.M. (3 Sep 1320 – 30 Apr 1321 Resigned)
- Arnaud Royardi, O.F.M. (30 Apr 1321 –1330)
- Orso Minutoli (1330–1333)
- Benedictus (1334–1347)
- Rogerius Sanseverino (1347–1348)
- Bertrand de Castronovo (de Chateauneuf) (7 Jan 1349 –1364)
- Guilelmus Sanseverino (1364–1378)
- Johannes Aquaviva (1378–1382) Avignon Obedience
- Robertus (1382– ? ) Avignon Obedience
- Guilelmus de Altavilla (1378–1389) Roman Obedience
- Ligorius Majorini (1394–1409) Roman Obedience
- Bartolommeo de Aprano (1409–1414) Roman Obedience
- Nicolaus Piscicelli, O.Cist. (1415–1441) Pisan Obedience
- Barnabo Orsini (1441–1449)
- Nicola Piscicelli (21 Apr 1449 – Apr 1471)
- Pietro Guglielmo de Rocha (30 Aug 1471 – 18 Oct 1482)
- Giovanni d'Aragona (13 Jan 1483– 17 Oct 1485) Administrator
- Ottaviano Bentivoglio (1486–1498)

=== 1500 to 1825 ===
- Juan de Vera (1500–1507)
- Federico Fregoso (1507–1529 Resigned)

Sede vacante (1529–1533)
Niccolò Ridolfi (7 Feb 1533 – 19 Dec 1548 Resigned)

- Lodovico Torres (1548–1553)
- Girolamo Seripando, O.E.S.A. (1554–1563)
- Gaspar Cervantes de Gaeta (1564–1568)
- Marcantonio Colonna (13 Oct 1568 – 25 Jun 1574 Resigned)
- Marco Antonio Marsilio Colonna (25 Jun 1574 – 24 Apr 1589 Died)
- Mario Bolognini (7 Jan 1591 – 25 Feb 1605 Died)
- Juan Beltrán Guevara y Figueroa (4 Dec 1606 – 1611)
- Lucio Sanseverino (19 Nov 1612 Appointed – 25 Dec 1623 Died)
- Gabriel Trejo y Paniagua (9 Jun 1625 Appointed – 12 Feb 1630 Died)
- Giulio Savelli (28 Jan 1630 Appointed – 15 Sep 1642 Resigned)
- Fabrizio Savelli (15 Sep 1642 Appointed – 1 Apr 1658 Resigned)
- Giovanni de Torres (1 Apr 1658 Appointed – Sep 1662 Died)
- Gregorio Carafa, C.R. (23 Jun 1664 Confirmed – 22 Feb 1675 Died)
- Alfonso Álvarez Barba Ossorio, O. Carm. (22 Jun 1676 Confirmed – Oct 1688 Died)
- Gerolamo Passarelli (1689– Nov 1690 Died)
- Marcos de Ostos, O. de M. (25 Jun 1692 Appointed – 19 Nov 1695 Died)
- Bonaventura Poerio, O.F.M. Obs. (11 Nov 1697 Appointed – 18 Nov 1722 Died)
- Pablo Vilana Perlas (12 May 1723 Confirmed – 6 May 1729 Died)
- Giovanni Fabrizio de Capua (11 Dec 1730 Confirmed – 1 Mar 1738 Died)
- Casimiro Rossi (5 May 1738 Appointed – 27 Dec 1758 Died)
- Isidoro Sánchez de Luna, O.S.B. (28 May 1759 Confirmed – 13 May 1783 Resigned)
- Giulio (Giovanni Michele) Pignatelli, O.S.B. (25 Jun 1784 Confirmed – 17 Aug 1796 Died)
- Salvatore Spinelli, O.S.B. (18 Dec 1797 Confirmed – 8 Jan 1805 Died)
- Fortunado Pinto (26 Jun 1805 Confirmed – 20 Nov 1825 Died)

== Archbishops of Salerno (-Acerno) ==
Latin Name: Salernitana (-Acernensis)
United: 27 June 1818 with the Diocese of Acerno

- Camillo Alleva (19 Dec 1825 Confirmed – 30 Oct 1829 Died)
- Michelangelo Lupoli (30 Sep 1831 Confirmed – 28 Jul 1834 Died)
- Marino Paglia (6 Apr 1835 Confirmed – 5 Sep 1857 Died)
- Antonio Salomone (21 Dec 1857 Confirmed – 9 Mar 1872 Died)
- Domenico Guadalupi (6 May 1872 Appointed – 8 Mar 1877 Resigned)
- Valerio Laspro (20 Mar 1877 Appointed – 22 Sep 1914 Died)
- Carlo Gregorio Maria Grasso, O.S.B. (7 Apr 1915 Appointed – 30 Mar 1929 Died)
- Nicola Monterisi (5 Oct 1929 Appointed – 30 Mar 1944 Died)
- Demetrio Moscato (22 Jan 1945 Appointed – 22 Oct 1968 Died)
- Gaetano Pollio, P.I.M.E. (5 Feb 1969 Appointed – 20 Oct 1984 Resigned)
- Guerino Grimaldi (20 Oct 1984 Succeeded – 12 Apr 1992 Died)

== Archbishops of Salerno-Campagna-Acerno ==
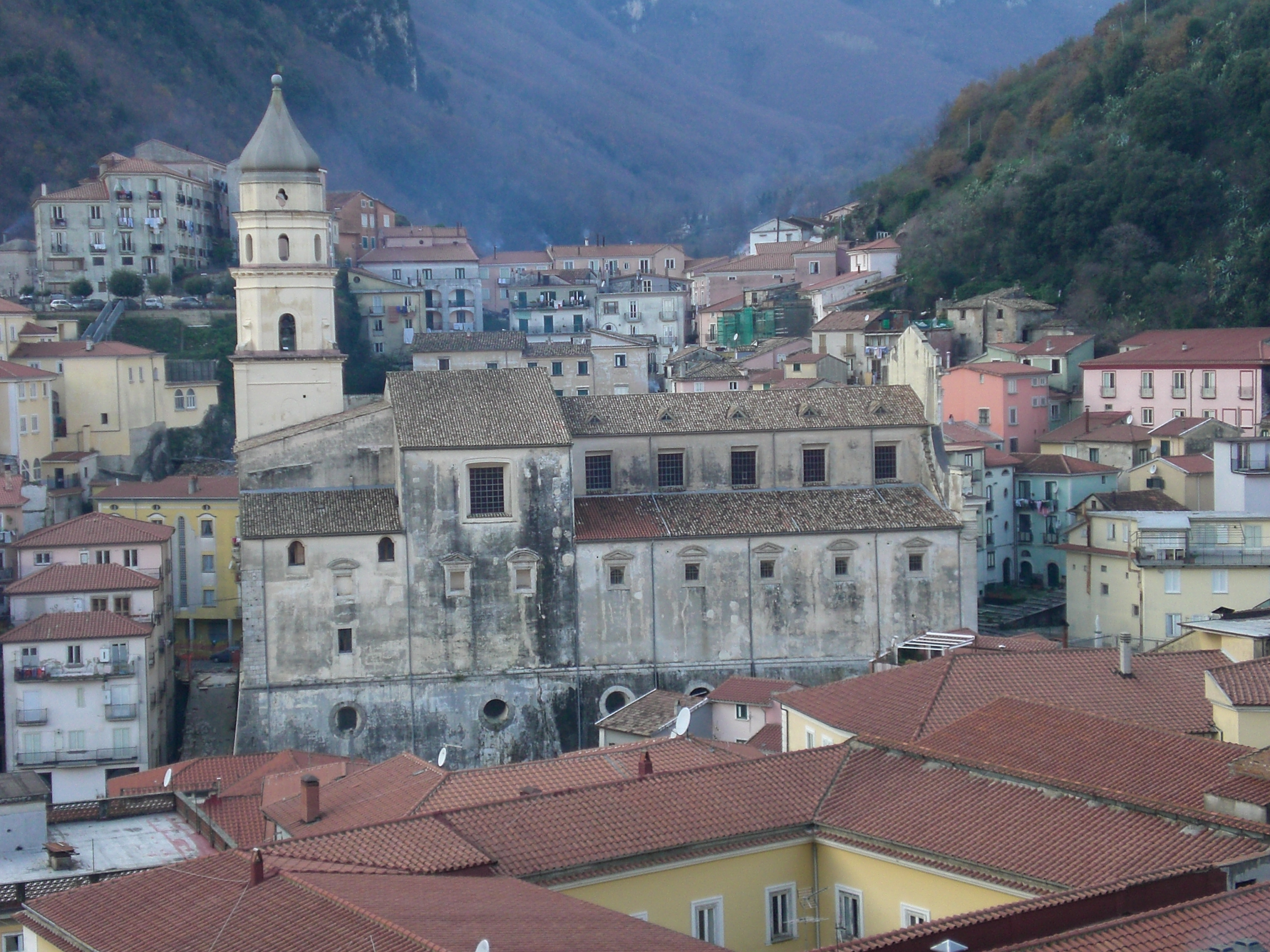
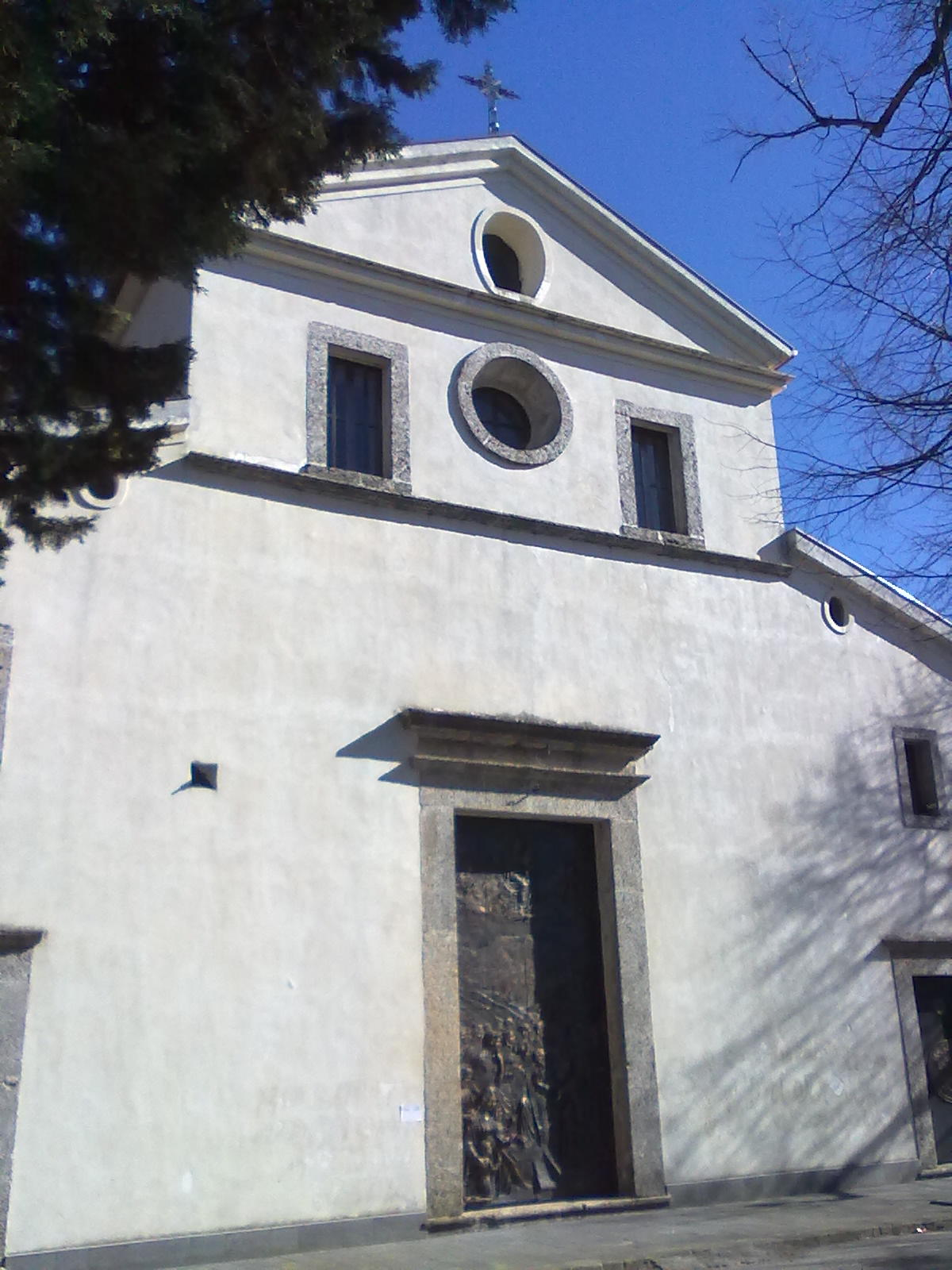
Co-cathedral in Campagna (left) Co-cathedral in Acerno

Latin Name: Salernitana-Campaniensis-Acernensis
United: 30 September 1986 with the Diocese of Campagna

- Gerardo Pierro (25 May 1992 Appointed – 10 Jun 2010 Retired)
- Luigi Moretti (10 Jun 2010 Appointed – 4 May 2019 Retired)
- Andrea Bellandi (4 May 2019 Appointed – )

== See also ==
- Roman Catholic Archdiocese of Sorrento-Castellammare di Stabia
- School of Salerno
- Timeline of Salerno
- Roman Catholic Diocese of Acerno
- Roman Catholic Diocese of Castellammare di Stabia
- Roman Catholic Diocese of Satriano e Campagna

== Books ==
- Eubel, Conradus, ed. (1913). Hierarchia catholica (in Latin). Vol. Tomus 1 (second ed.). Münster: Libreria Regensbergiana.
- Eubel, Conradus, ed. (1914). Hierarchia catholica (in Latin). Vol. Tomus 2 (second ed.). Münster: Libreria Regensbergiana.
- Eubel, Conradus; Gulik, Guilelmus (1923). Hierarchia catholica (in Latin). Vol. 3 (second ed.). Münster: Libreria Regensbergiana.
- Gams, Pius Bonifatius (1873). Series episcoporum Ecclesiae catholicae: quotquot innotuerunt a beato Petro apostolo (in Latin). Ratisbon: Typis et Sumptibus Georgii Josephi Manz.
- Gauchat, Patritius (Patrice) (1935). Hierarchia catholica (in Latin). Vol. IV (1592-1667). Münster: Libraria Regensbergiana.
- Ritzler, Remigius; Sefrin, Pirminus (1952). Hierarchia catholica medii et recentis aevi (in Latin). Vol. V (1667-1730). Patavii: Messagero di S. Antonio.
- Ritzler, Remigius; Sefrin, Pirminus (1958). Hierarchia catholica medii et recentis aevi (in Latin). Vol. VI (1730-1799). Patavii: Messagero di S. Antonio.
- Ritzler, Remigius; Sefrin, Pirminus (1968). Hierarchia Catholica medii et recentioris aevi (in Latin). Vol. VII (1800–1846). Monasterii: Libreria Regensburgiana.
- Remigius Ritzler; Pirminus Sefrin (1978). Hierarchia catholica Medii et recentioris aevi (in Latin). Vol. VIII (1846–1903). Il Messaggero di S. Antonio.
- Pięta, Zenon (2002). Hierarchia catholica medii et recentioris aevi (in Latin). Vol. IX (1903–1922). Padua: Messagero di San Antonio. ISBN 978-88-250-1000-8.

=== Studies ===
- Cappelletti, Giuseppe (1870). Le chiese d'Italia: dalla loro origine sino ai nostri giorni (in Italian). Vol. vigesimo (20). Venezia: G. Antonelli. pp. 281–326.
- Crisci, G. (1976). Il cammino della Chiesa salernitana nell'opera dei suoi vescovi. (in Italian) Napoli-Roma: Libreria editrice Redenzione 1976.
- D'Avino, Vincenzio (1848). Cenni storici sulle chiese arcivescovili, vescovili, e prelatizie (nullius) del regno delle due Sicilie (in Italian). Naples: dalle stampe di Ranucci. pp. 593–601. [article written by Giuseppe Paesano].
- De Angelis, Michele (1936). Il duomo di Salerno nella sua storia, nelle sue vicende e nei suoi monumenti. (in Italian) Salerno, 1936.
- Kehr, Paul Fridolin (1935). Italia pontificia. Vol. VIII: Regnum Normannorum — Campania. Berlin: Weidmann. (in Latin) pp. 333–366.
- Lanzoni, Francesco (1927). Le diocesi d'Italia dalle origini al principio del secolo VII (an. 604). (in Italian) Faenza: F. Lega, pp. 250–252.
- "Chronicon Salernitanum." (in Latin). In: Monumenta Germaniae Historica (ed. G. Pertz), Scriptorum Tomus III (Hannover: Hahn 1839), pp. 467–561.
- Oldoni, M. (1972). Anonimo salernitano del X secolo (Naples: Guida Editori 1972).
- Paesano, Giuseppe (1846). Memorie per servire alla storia della chiesa Salernitana. (in Italian). Parte 1, Parte 2 (Napoli: V. Manfredi 1846).
- Savio, Fedele (1902), "I vescovi di Salerno nei secoli IX e X," (in Italian), in: Atti della Reale Accademia delle scienze di Torino 37 part 2 (Torino 1902), pp. 33–42 [104-113].
- Schipa, Michelangelo (1880), Alfano I. Arcivescovo di Salerno: Studio Storico-Letterario. (in Italian). Salerno. Tip. nazionale 1880.
- Torelli, Felice (1848). La chiave del Concordato dell'anno 1818 e degli atti emanati posteriormente al medesimo. (in Italian) Volume 1, second edition Naples: Stamperia del Fibreno, 1848.
- Ughelli, Ferdinando; Coleti, NIccolo (1721). Italia sacra sive De episcopis Italiæ, et insularum adjacentium (in Latin). Vol. Tomus septimus (7). Venice: apud Sebastianum Coleti. pp. 343–445.
- Westerbergh, Ulla (1956). Chronicon Salernitanum: a critical edition with studies on literary and historical sources, and on languages. Stockholm: Almquist & Wiksell, 1956.

==== External links ====
- "Archdiocese of Salerno-Campagna-Acerno". Catholic-Hierarchy.org. David M. Cheney.
