= Jerónimo Bernardo de Quirós =

Roman Catholic prelate

Most Reverend Jerónimo Bernardo de Quirós
- Bishop of Pozzuoli
- Church: Catholic Church
- Diocese: Diocese of Pozzuoli
- In office: 1604–1617
- Predecessor: Leonardo Vairo
- Successor: Lorenzo Mongiò Galatino
- Previous post: Bishop of Castellammare di Stabia (1601–1604)

Orders
- Consecration: 28 January 1601 by Antonmaria Sauli

Personal details
- Born: Spain
- Died: 1617 Pozzuoli, Italy

Jerónimo Bernardo de Quirós, O. Praem. (died 1617) was a Roman Catholic prelate who served as Bishop of Pozzuoli (1604–1617) and Bishop of Castellammare di Stabia (1601–1604).

== Biography ==
Jerónimo Bernardo de Quirós was born in Spain and ordained a priest in the Order of Canons Regular of Prémontré. On 28 January 1601, he was consecrated bishop by Antonmaria Sauli, Cardinal-Priest of Santo Stefano al Monte Celio, with Agostino Quinzio, Bishop of Korčula, and Giovanni Battista del Tufo, Bishop of Acerra, serving as co-consecrators. On 15 February 1601, he was appointed during the papacy of Pope Clement VIII as Bishop of Castellammare di Stabia. On 18 August 1604, he was appointed Bishop of Pozzuoli by Pope Clement VIII. He served as Bishop of Pozzuoli until his death in 1617.

== External links and additional sources ==
- Vidal Guitarte Izquierdo (1994). Episcopologio español (1500-1699): españoles obispos en España, América, Filipinas y otros países (in Spanish). Roma: Instituto Español de Historia Eclesiástico. pp. 116, no. 733. ISBN 9788470094187.

Catholic Church titles
Preceded by Vittorino Mansi	Bishop of Castellammare di Stabia; 1601–1604	Succeeded by Ippolito Riva
Preceded by Leonardo Vairo	Bishop of Pozzuoli; 1604–1617	Succeeded by Lorenzo Mongiò Galatino
