= Carlo Maranta =

Italian Roman Catholic prelate

Most Reverend Carlo Maranta
- Bishop of Tropea
- Church: Catholic Church
- Diocese: Diocese of Tropea
- In office: 1657–1664
- Predecessor: Juan Lozano (bishop)
- Successor: Luis Morales (bishop)

Orders
- Consecration: 20 September 1637 by Francesco Maria Brancaccio

Personal details
- Born: 1583 Naples, Italy
- Died: 26 January 1664 (age 80) Tropea, Italy

Carlo Maranta (1583 – 26 January 1664) was a Roman Catholic prelate who served as Bishop of Tropea (1657–1664) and Bishop of Giovinazzo (1637–1657).

== Biography ==
Carlo Maranta was born in Naples, Italy in 1583. On 7 September 1637, he was appointed during the papacy of Pope Urban VIII as Bishop of Giovinazzo. On 20 September 1637, he was consecrated bishop by Francesco Maria Brancaccio, Cardinal-Priest of Santi XII Apostoli, with Gaetano Cossa, Archbishop of Otranto, and Tommaso Carafa, Bishop Emeritus of Vulturara e Montecorvin, serving as co-consecrators. On 24 March 1657, he was selected as Bishop of Tropea and confirmed by Pope Alexander VII on 24 September 1657. He served as Bishop of Tropea until his death on 26 January 1664.

== External links and additional sources ==
- Cheney, David M. "Diocese of Giovinazzo e Terlizzi". Catholic-Hierarchy.org. (for Chronology of Bishops) ^{[self-published]}
- Chow, Gabriel. "Diocese of Giovinazzo (Italy)". GCatholic.org. (for Chronology of Bishops) ^{[self-published]}
- Cheney, David M. "Diocese of Tropea". Catholic-Hierarchy.org. (for Chronology of Bishops) ^{[self-published]}
- Chow, Gabriel. "Diocese of Tropea (Italy)". GCatholic.org. (for Chronology of Bishops) ^{[self-published]}

Catholic Church titles
Preceded by Giulio Masi	Bishop of Giovinazzo; 1637–1657	Succeeded by Michelangelo Vaginari
Preceded by Juan Lozano (bishop)	Bishop of Tropea; 1657–1664	Succeeded by Luis Morales (bishop)
