= Luis Morales (bishop) =

Spanish Roman Catholic prelate (1608–1681)

Most Reverend Luis Morales
- Bishop of Tropea
- Church: Catholic Church
- Diocese: Diocese of Tropea
- In office: 1667–1681
- Predecessor: Carlo Maranta
- Successor: Girolamo Borgia
- Previous post: Bishop of Ariano (1659–1667)

Orders
- Consecration: 16 March 1659 by Marcantonio Franciotti

Personal details
- Born: 1608 Lucerna, Spain
- Died: 10 January 1681 (age 73) Tropea, Italy

Luis Morales, O.S.A. (1608 – 10 January 1681) was a Roman Catholic prelate who served as Bishop of Tropea (1667–1681) and Bishop of Ariano (1659–1667).

== Biography ==
Luis Morales was born in Lucerna, Spain in 1608 and ordained a priest in the Order of Saint Augustine. On 10 March 1659, he was appointed during the papacy of Pope Alexander VII as Bishop of Ariano. On 16 March 1659, he was consecrated bishop by Marcantonio Franciotti, Cardinal-Priest of Santa Maria della Pace. On 7 February 1667, he was appointed during the papacy of Pope Alexander VII as Bishop of Tropea. He served as Bishop of Tropea until his death on 10 January 1681.

== External links and additional sources ==
- Cheney, David M. "Diocese of Ariano Irpino-Lacedonia". Catholic-Hierarchy.org. (for Chronology of Bishops) ^{[self-published]}
- Chow, Gabriel. "Diocese of Ariano Irpino–Lacedonia". GCatholic.org. (for Chronology of Bishops) ^{[self-published]}
- Cheney, David M. "Diocese of Tropea". Catholic-Hierarchy.org. (for Chronology of Bishops) ^{[self-published]}
- Chow, Gabriel. "Diocese of Tropea (Italy)". GCatholic.org. (for Chronology of Bishops) ^{[self-published]}

Catholic Church titles
Preceded by Alessandro Rossi	Bishop of Ariano; 1659–1667	Succeeded by Emmanuele Brancaccio
Preceded by Carlo Maranta	Bishop of Tropea; 1667–1681	Succeeded by Girolamo Borgia
