= Nicola Ippoliti =

Italian Catholic bishop (died 1511)

Most Reverend Nicola Ippoliti
- Archbishop (Personal Title) of Ariano
- Church: Catholic Church
- Diocese: Diocese of Ariano
- In office: 1498–1511
- Predecessor: Paolo Bracchi
- Successor: Diomede Carafa
- Previous post: Bishop of Ariano (1480–1481)

Personal details
- Died: 1511 Ariano, Kingdom of Naples

Nicola Ippoliti (died 1511) was a Roman Catholic prelate who served as Archbishop (Personal Title) of Ariano (1498–1511), Archbishop (Personal Title) of Città di Castello (1493–1498), Archbishop of Rossano (1481–1493), and Bishop of Ariano (1480–1481).

== Biography ==
On 14 July 1480, Nicola Ippoliti was appointed during the papacy of Pope Sixtus IV as Bishop of Ariano. On 5 September 1481, he was appointed during the papacy of Pope Sixtus IV as Archbishop of Rossano. On 13 January 1493, he was appointed during the papacy of Pope Alexander VI as Archbishop (Personal Title) of Città di Castello. On 10 January 1498, he was re-appointed during the papacy of Pope Alexander VI as Archbishop (Personal Title) of Ariano. He served as Bishop of Ariano until he died in 1511.

== External links and additional sources ==
- Cheney, David M. "Diocese of Ariano Irpino-Lacedonia". Catholic-Hierarchy.org. (for Chronology of Bishops) ^{[self-published]}
- Chow, Gabriel. "Diocese of Ariano Irpino–Lacedonia". GCatholic.org. (for Chronology of Bishops) ^{[self-published]}
- Cheney, David M. "Diocese of Città di Castello". Catholic-Hierarchy.org. (for Chronology of Bishops) ^{[self-published]}
- Chow, Gabriel. "Diocese of Città di Castello". GCatholic.org. (for Chronology of Bishops) ^{[self-published]}
- Cheney, David M. "Archdiocese of Rossano-Cariati". Catholic-Hierarchy.org. (for Chronology of Bishops)
- Chow, Gabriel. "Archdiocese of Rossano-Cariati (Italy)". GCatholic.org. (for Chronology of Bishops)

Catholic Church titles
| Preceded by Giacomo Porfida | Bishop of Ariano (1st time); 1480–1481 | Succeeded by Paolo Bracchi |
| Preceded by | Archbishop of Rossano; 1481–1493 | Succeeded by Giovanni Battista Lagni |
| Preceded by Giovanni Battista Lagni | Archbishop (Personal Title) of Città di Castello; 1493–1498 | Succeeded by Ventura Bufalini |
| Preceded by Paolo Bracchi | Archbishop (Personal Title) of Ariano (2nd time); 1498–1511 | Succeeded by Diomede Carafa |
