= Diocese of Ariano Irpino-Lacedonia =

Roman Catholic diocese in Italy

Coordinates: 41.1500°N 15.0833°E

Diocese of Ariano Irpino-Lacedonia Dioecesis Arianensis Hirpina-Laquedoniensis Diocesi di Ariano Irpino-Lacedonia

Catholic
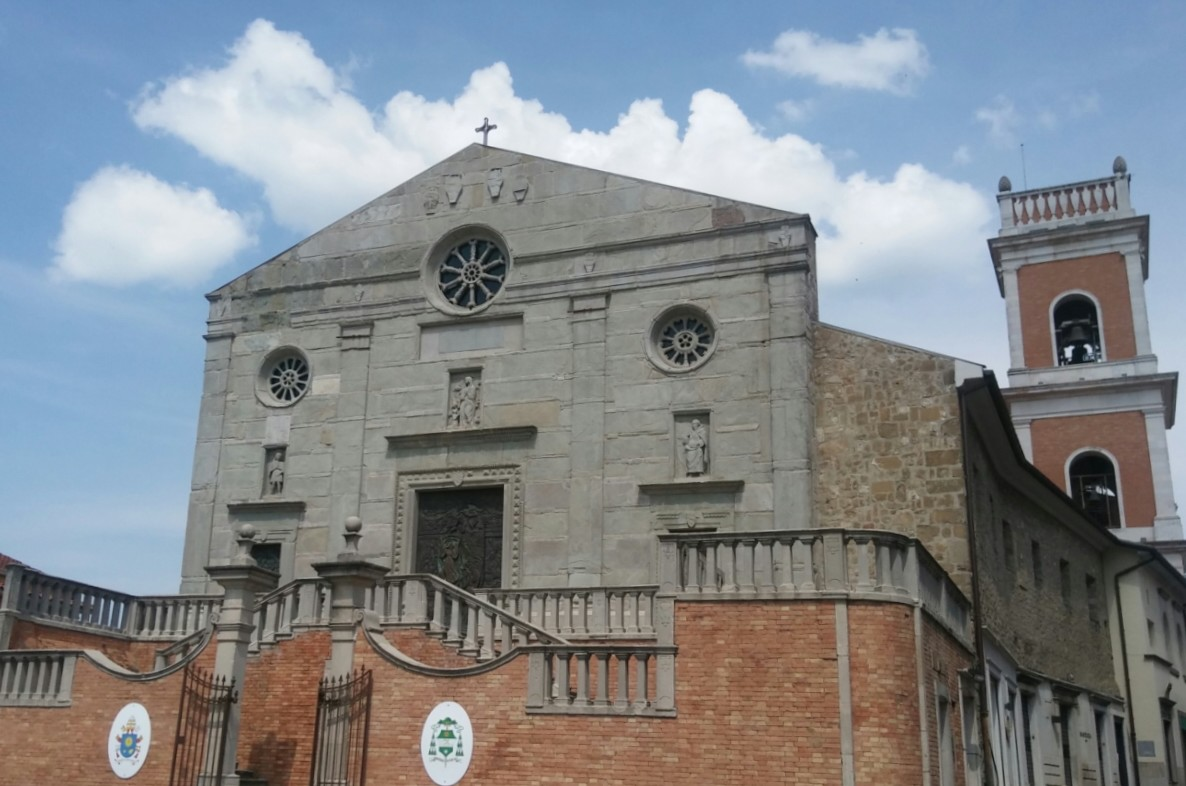
- Ariano Irpino Cathedral

Location
- Country: Italy
- Episcopal conference: Episcopal Conference of Italy
- Ecclesiastical region: Campania
- Ecclesiastical province: Benevento

Statistics
- Area: 781 km^{2} (302 sq mi)
- Population: Total; Catholics: (as of 2020); 61,530; 61,000 (guess)
- Parishes: 43

Information
- Denomination: Catholic Church
- Rite: Roman Rite
- Established: 10th century
- Cathedral: Ariano Irpino Cathedral (Basilica Cattedrale di S. Maria Assunta di Ariano Irpino)
- Co-cathedral: Lacedonia Cathedral (Concattedrale di S. Maria Assunta di Lacedonia)
- Secular priests: 42 (diocesan); 9 (religious Orders); 7 Permanent Deacons

Current leadership
- Pope: Leo XIV
- Bishop: Sergio Melillo

Website
- Diocese of Ariano Arpino-Lacedonia (in Italian)

The Diocese of Ariano Irpino-Lacedonia (Latin: Dioecesis Arianensis Hirpina-Laquedoniensis) is a Latin diocese of the Catholic Church. It is a suffragan of the Archdiocese of Benevento.

In 1986 the Diocese of Ariano and the Diocese of Lacedonia merged to form the current diocese of Ariano Irpino-Lacedonia, which comprises twenty towns in the province of Avellino, three in that of Benevento, and one in the province of Foggia. There are 43 parishes in the diocese.

== History ==
Ariano (currently Ariano Irpino), a medieval town built on three hills along the Apennines, occupies an ancient site of the Samnite tribe of the Hirpini.

Beneventum, at the beginning of the fourth century, had a bishop, and the Gospel may have reached Ariano from that city. The Bishop of Beneventum was one of the nineteen prelates who were present at the Synod of Rome, held in the year 313.

Ariano was an episcopal city from the tenth century and perhaps before that time. It is first mentioned in the Bull "Cum Certum Sit" of Pope John XIII of 26 May 979, which promoted the diocese of Beneventum to metropolitan rank, and named Ariano as a suffragan see.

It is clear that the diocese existed at the beginning of the 11th century. In a document of October 1016, the Archpriest Petrus acts in the capacity of "rector episcopii sancte sedis Arianensis, in a suit "una cum Cicinus clericus atvocatorem predicto episcopio." It is not clear whether Petrus is acting on behalf of an unnamed bishop, or is acting during a vacancy in the episcopacy.

The first known bishop was Bonifacius (attested 1039).

In 1070, Bishop Meinardus erected in his cathedral a marble baptistery on the walls of which verses were inscribed, recording the date and the bishop's name. Bishop Meinardus of Ariano attended the provincial synod summoned by Archbishop Milo of Benevento in March 1075.

The bishops of Ariano also held the fief and the title of Barons of S. Eleuterio, certainly by 1307, and perhaps as a gift of the emperor Frederick II (d. 1250).

The city of Ariano was completely ruined by the great earthquakes of December 1456. The dead numbered between 600 and 2200, depending on reports. Bishop Orso Leone (1449–1456) had a metrical inscription placed in the episcopal palace, numbering the dead at a thousand. The town was rebuilt by 1470.

The diocese was severely affected by a plague in 1528, bringing about the deaths of around 5,000 persons. The loss of life was so heavy that, taking into account also the losses from earthquakes, it was necessary to close five parishes.

The diocesan seminary was founded in 1564, by Bishop Donato Laurenti (1563–1584). Bishop Giacinto della Calce, O.Theat. (1697–1715) rebuilt the diocesan seminary, which had been ruined in the earthquakes of 1688 and 1694. It was again destroyed by the earthquake of 1732, and rebuilt by Bishop Filippo Tipaldi (1717–1748) in 1735.

In November 1732, another great earthquake struck Ariano, which was again totally destroyed. The number of dead, however, was only c. 160, since it was harvest time and the largest part of the population was in the fields. With the churches ruined, the bishop had a temporary church constructed of wood and plaster in the main square, so that religious services could be held.

In 1697, the city of Ariano had a population of some 5,000 individuals; in the city were ten parishes and two collegiate churches. In 1748, the city of Ariano had a population estimated at 10,000. In the city were twelve parishes, of which three were collegiate churches, each with a number of canons. There were five houses of religious men, and one of women. The diocese also had twelve "loca". The population of the entire diocese was reckoned at 54,000 souls.

=== After Napoleon ===
Following the extinction of the Napoleonic Kingdom of Italy, the Congress of Vienna authorized the restoration of the Papal States and the Kingdom of Naples. Since the French occupation had seen the abolition of many Church institutions in the Kingdom, as well as the confiscation of most Church property and resources, it was imperative that Pope Pius VII and King Ferdinand IV reach agreement on restoration and restitution.

A concordat was finally signed on 16 February 1818, and ratified by Pius VII on 25 February 1818. Ferdinand issued the concordat as a law on 21 March 1818. The re-erection of the dioceses of the kingdom and the ecclesiastical provinces took more than three years. The right of the king to nominate the candidate for a vacant bishopric was recognized, as in the Concordat of 1741, subject to papal confirmation (preconisation). On 27 June 1818, Pius VII issued the bull De Ulteriore, in which he reestablished the metropolitan archbishopric of Benevento, with ten suffragan dioceses, including the diocese of Ariano.

=== The case of Bishop Caputo ===
Fra Michele Maria Caputo was a Dominican friar, born at Nardo, in the heel of the boot of Italy. He served his year as a novice in Trani, where he also obtained a degree in theology. He taught humanities at Nardo, and then philosophy and theology to students in his Order. He was repeatedly elected Prior of his convent in Taranto, and in 1845 became Provincial of the Dominican province of Puglia. In 1852 he became a master of theology.

On 12 June 1852, he was nominated Bishop of Oppido Maritima, and was confirmed by Pope Pius IX on 27 September 1852. He made his formal entry into the diocese on 20 February 1851, and immediately began a program of reform of the clergy. He also undertook a reform of the staff of the diocesan seminary, replacing dead wood with priests who were in touch with modern philosophy and theology. He was a supporter of the pope's claims to universal spiritual authority, and he warmly endorsed the new doctrine of the Immaculate Conception (1854). He established in his diocese a "Monte di pieta," a sort of controlled pawn brokerage, and a "Monte frumentario," a sort of agricultural bank. When he began to look closely into the episcopal income and the finances of the diocese, he discovered many cases of misappropriation of goods and properties. He undertook a series of lawsuits, intending to recover everything which had slipped from the hands of his predectessors. His successes, especially in the civil courts brought him resentment and opposition in many quarters. Retaliation against the bishop took the form accusations lodged with higher religious and civil authorities, in particular, that he was often absent from Oppido, in the village of Piminoro, where he maintained an illicit relationship with his housekeeper. The Pope responded to the pressure by transferring Bishop Caputo, with the consent of King Ferdinand II of the Two Sicilies, to the diocese of Ariano, on 27 September 1858; Caputo was appointed Administrator of Oppido.

The successes of the Piedmontese armies, and the incorporation of most of the Papal States into the Kingdom of Sardinia, as well as the successes of Giuseppe Garibaldi in Sicily, stimulated spontaneous uprisings in many cities of the Kingdom of Naples. When supporters of Garibaldi, led by General Turr, approached Ariano, a conservative peasant uprising resulted in the murders of some thirty liberals. Bishop Caputo's brother Giuseppe was arrested by the General, causing the bishop to flee to Naples.

On 7 September 1860, Garibaldi and his forces entered Naples. On 20 September 1860, the Giornale officiale di Napoli published Caputo's official adherence to the new regime in Naples, which he had signed two days earlier. On December 20, 1860, Bishop Caputo issued a pastoral letter, criticizing the closed-mindedness of seminary instruction, and invited the clergy to welcome Vittorio Emanuele, whom they proclaimed their King and who, having placed himself at the head of the nation, devoted himself to the liberation of his people. On 28 February 1861, the papal Congregation of the Council issued a formal warning to the bishop, ordering him to leave the office of Cappellano Maiore, which he was holding on a temporary basis. On 9 July 1861, he was named Cappellano Maggiore by King Victor Emmanuele II, giving him jurisdiction over royal churches and chapels as well as army chaplains, independent of the authority of the archbishop of Naples. On 17 September 1861, Caputo was excommunicated by the Pope.

Around 1860, with permission of the Minister of the Interior of Tuscany, Baron Ricasoli, associations of liberal priests were authorized. The papal government, however, sensing the danger in organizations outside of their control, had the bishops suppress them, under threat of excommunication. In January 1861, when the archbishop of Naples was in exile, priests and laypeople in southern Italy formed a new association, the "Clerico-Liberal-Italian Association" (Adunanza clerico-liberale italiana), which, in the summer of 1862, claimed a membership of more than 4,000 persons. On 21 December 1861, Bishop Caputo became its Honorary President. The first point in the association's manifesto was that the pope should renounce his temporal pretensions.

Bishop Caputo died on 6 September 1862, unreconciled with the pope. His funeral took place at S. Franceco di Paola in Naples. The diocese of Ariano was without a bishop for the next nine years.

=== Diocesan Reorganization ===
Following the Second Vatican Council, and in accordance with the norms laid out in the council's decree, Christus Dominus chapter 40, Pope Paul VI ordered a reorganization of the ecclesiastical provinces in southern Italy. Pope Paul VI ordered consultations among the members of the Congregation of Bishops in the Vatican Curia, the Italian Bishops Conference, and the various dioceses concerned.

On 18 February 1984, the Vatican and the Italian State signed a new and revised concordat. Based on the revisions, a set of Normae was issued on 15 November 1984, which was accompanied in the next year, on 3 June 1985, by enabling legislation. According to the agreement, the practice of having one bishop govern two separate dioceses at the same time, aeque personaliter, was abolished. The Vatican continued consultations which had begun under Pope John XXIII for the merging of small dioceses, especially those with personnel and financial problems, into one combined diocese.

On 30 September 1986, Pope John Paul II ordered that the dioceses of Ariano and Laquedonia be merged into one diocese with one bishop, with the Latin title Dioecesis Arianensis Hirpina-Laquedoniensis. The seat of the diocese was to be in Ariano, and the cathedral of Ariano was to serve as the cathedral of the merged diocese. The cathedral in Laquedonia was to become a co-cathedral, and its cathedral Chapter was to be a Capitulum Concathedralis. There was to be only one diocesan Tribunal, in Ariano, and likewise one seminary, one College of Consultors, and one Priests' Council. The territory of the new diocese was to include the territory of the suppressed diocese of Laquedonia. The new diocese was to be a suffragan of the archdiocese of Benevento.

=== Chapter and cathedral ===
The cathedral of Ariano was dedicated to the Taking Up of the Body of the Virgin Mary into Heaven sub titulo Deiparae Virginis Assumptae. It contained the remains of Bishop Otto Frangipani, the patron of the city of Ariano. Special rituals are performed in the city on 13 March, the bishop's feast day. In 1512, Bishop Diomede Carafa reconsecrated the restored cathedral, and rededicated the restored episcopal palace.

The cathedral was administered by a corporate body called the Chapter, which consisted, in 1721, of five dignities (the Archdeacon, the Archpriest, the Primicerius Major, the Primicerius Minor, and the Treasurer) and fifteen canons. The office of archdeacon was a benefice that was reserved to the pope; the candidate was nominated by the Kings of Naples, and approved by the pope. Bishop Johannes (attested 1349–1356) increased the number of canons to twenty. Pope Alexander IV mentions in a document of 16 October 1255, that Bishop Jacobus had been Cantor of the cathedral before being elected bishop by the Chapter. In 1451, Bishop Orso Leone (1449–1456) created the office of Sacrista Major. In 1613, Bishop Ottavio Ridolfi (1612–1623) declared that when the next two canonries should become vacant, they should be assigned prebends and the should become the Canon Penitentiarius and the Canon Theologus, in accordance with the decree of the Council of Trent. In 1619, Paolo Emilio Riccio became the first Canon Penitentiary; and in 1622, Giovan Lorenzo Fiamengo became the first Canon Theologus. In 1748, there were five dignities and twenty canons.

==== Collegiate churches ====
In addition to the cathedral, the city of Ariano also had three collegiate churches, each of which was also a parish church. The Collegiate Church of S. Michele Arcangelo was presided over by the bishop, who was its abbot; he governed through an appointed Vicar Curate. The college of canons originally numbered five, but three were added later. The date of the foundation of the church is not known. It originally had a nave and two aisles, but due to the earthquake of 1732, it was restored by Bishop Tipaldi (1717–1748) with only the nave. The Collegiate Church of S. Pietro was governed by an abbot, along with five canons, to which were added two more in 1711, thanks to the generosity of cathedral Canon Orazio Memmoli. The Collegiate Church of S. Giovanni della Valle had originally been only a parish church. It was made a collegiate church in 1715, headed by a Provost (who had spiritual responsibility, and therefore had to be a priest) and six canons. After the earthquake of 1732, it was rebuilt on a somewhat larger scale than before.

=== Synods ===
A diocesan synod was an irregularly held, but important, meeting of the bishop of a diocese, his clergy, and other interested parties. Its purpose was (1) to proclaim generally the various decrees already issued by the bishop; (2) to discuss and ratify measures on which the bishop chose to consult with his clergy; (3) to publish statutes and decrees of the diocesan synod, of the provincial synod, and of the Holy See.

Bishop Alfonso Herrera, O.S.A. (1585–1602) held a diocesan synod in 1594, in which limits were imposed on regular clergy to hear confessions, and only with written permission of the parish priest. Arrangements were also made for financing the diocesan seminary, through the suppression of the parish of Ssmo. Salvatore and the assignation of some sixteen benefices in various churches.

Bishop Juan Bonilla, O. Carm. (1689–1696) attended the provincial synod, summoned by Cardinal Vinzenzo Maria Orsini, Archbishop of Benevento, held on 11–14 April 1693.

On 12 May 1668, Bishop Emmanuele Brancaccio, O.S.B. (1667–1686) presided over a diocesan synod held in the cathedral of Ariano.

Bishop Francesco Capezzuti (1838–1855) held a diocesan synod in the cathedral of Ariano on 14–16 May 1843.

== Bishops of Ariano ==
=== to 1500 ===
...

- Bonifacius (attested 1039)

...

- Meinardus (attested 1069–1080)
- Ursus (attested 1087 or 1102)

...

- Sarulo (1091–1096)
- Gerardus (attested 1098)

...

- Riccardus (attested 1122-1134)
- Paganus (attested 1136)

...

- Willelmus (attested 1164)
- Bartholmaeus (attested 1179)

...

- Rao (attested 1297–after 1301)
- Rostagnus (attested 1309–1320)
- Laurentius, O.Min. (1320– ? )
- Robertus (c.1342–1349?)
- Johannes (attested 1349–1356)
- Tommaso (1356–1363)
- Dionysius, O.E.S.A. (1364–1372)
- Simon (1372–1373)
- Dominicus, O.Carm. (1373– ? )
- Geraldinus (1382–1390)
- Lucas, O.S.B. (1390–1400) Roman Obedience
- Donatus (1400–1406) Roman Obedience
- Angelo de Raimo (1406–1432) Roman Obedience
- Angelo Grassi (1433–1449)
- Orso Leone (1449–1456)
- Giacomo Porfida (1463–1480 Died)
- Nicola Ippoliti (1480–1481 Appointed, Archbishop of Rossano)
- Paolo Bracchi (1481–1497 Died)

=== 1500 to 1986 ===
- Nicola Ippoliti (1498–1511 Died)
- Diomede Carafa (1511–1560 Died)
- Ottaviano Preconio, O.F.M. Conv. (1561–1562)
- Donato Laurenti (1563–1584 Died)
- Alfonso Herrera (bishop), O.S.A. (1585–1602 Died)
- Vittorino Mansi, O.S.B. (1602–1611 Died)
- Ottavio Ridolfi (1612–1623 Appointed, Bishop of Agrigento)
- Paolo Cajatia (1624–1638 Died)
- Andrés Aguado de Valdés, O.S.A. (1642–1645 Died)
- Alessandro Rossi (1650–1656 Died)
- Luis Morales (bishop), O.S.A. (1659–1667 Appointed, Bishop of Tropea)
- Emmanuele Brancaccio, O.S.B. (1667–1686 Died)
- Juan Bonilla (bishop), O. Carm. (1689–1696)
- Giacinto della Calce, C.R. (1697–1715)
- Filippo Tipaldi (1717–1748 Died)
- Isidoro Sánchez de Luna, O.S.B. (1748–1754)
- Domenico Saverio Pulci-Doria (1754–1777)
- Lorenzo Potenza (1778–1792)
- Giovanni Saverio Pirelli (1792–1803)

Sede vacante (1803–1818)

- Domenico Russo (1818–1837)
- Francesco Capezzuti (1838–1855)
- Concezio Pasquini (1857–1858)
- Michele Caputo, O.P. (1858–1862)

Sede vacante (1862–1871)

- Luigi Maria Aguilar, B. (1871–1875)
- Salvatore Maria Nisio, Sch. P. (1875–1876 Resigned)
- Francesco Trotta (1876–1888)
- Andrea d’Agostino, C.M. (1888–1913)
- Giovanni Onorato Carcaterra, O.F.M. (1914–1915 Resigned)
- Cosimo Agostino (1915–1918)
- Giuseppe Lojacono (1918–1939 Resigned)
- Gioacchino Pedicini (1939–1949 Appointed, Bishop of Avellino)
- Pasquale Venezia (1951–1967 Appointed, Bishop of Avellino)
- Agapito Simeoni (1974–1976 Died)
- Nicola Agnozzi, O.F.M. Conv. (1976–1988 Retired)

== Bishops of Ariano Irpino-Lacedonia ==
United on 30 September 1986 with the Diocese of Lacedonia

- Antonio Forte, O.F.M. (1988–1993 Appointed, Bishop of Avellino)
- Eduardo Davino (1993–1997 Appointed, Bishop of Palestrina)
- Gennaro Pascarella (1998–2004 Appointed, Coadjutor Bishop of Pozzuoli)
- Giovanni D'Alise (2004–2014 Appointed, Bishop of Caserta)
- Sergio Melillo (23 May 2015 – )

== See also ==
- Roman Catholic Diocese of Lacedonia
- Catholic Church in Italy
- List of Catholic dioceses in Italy

== Bibliography ==
=== Episcopal lists ===
- Eubel, Conradus, ed. (1913). Hierarchia catholica (in Latin). Vol. I (second ed.). Münster: Libreria Regensbergiana.
- Eubel, Conradus, ed. (1914). Hierarchia catholica (in Latin). Vol. II (second ed.). Münster: Libreria Regensbergiana.
- Eubel, Conradus; Gulik, Guilelmus (1923). Hierarchia catholica (in Latin). Vol. III (second ed.). Münster: Libreria Regensbergiana.
- Gams, Pius Bonifatius (1873). Series episcoporum Ecclesiae catholicae: quotquot innotuerunt a beato Petro apostolo (in Latin). Ratisbon: Typis et Sumptibus Georgii Josephi Manz. pp. 852–853.
- Gauchat, Patritius (Patrice) (1935). Hierarchia catholica (in Latin). Vol. IV (1592-1667). Münster: Libraria Regensbergiana.
- Ritzler, Remigius; Sefrin, Pirminus (1952). Hierarchia catholica medii et recentis aevi (in Latin). Vol. V (1667-1730). Patavii: Messagero di S. Antonio.
- Ritzler, Remigius; Sefrin, Pirminus (1958). Hierarchia catholica medii et recentis aevi (in Latin). Vol. VI (1730-1799). Patavii: Messagero di S. Antonio.

=== Studies ===
- Barberius, Fabius, Fabii Barberii ... Catalogus episcoporum Ariani sub Hispaniarum Regis nominatione vsq; ad præsens nostrum æuum anno 1635. (in Latin). Neapoli: Typis F. Sauij, 1635.
- Barberio, F. (2006). Catalogus episcoporum Ariani. Ariane 2006.
- Cappelletti, Giuseppe (1864). Le chiese d'Italia: dalla loro origine sino ai nostri giorni (in Italian). Vol. Tomo decimonono (19). Venice: G. Antonelli. pp. 117–138.
- Esposito, L. (2016). "Ariano sacra nei suoi antichi documenti." (in Italian). In: Quei maleteddi Normanni. Studi offerti a Errico Cuozzo. ed. Jean-Marie Martin, Rosanna Alaggio. Napoli: Centro Europei die Studi Normanni 2016.
- Flammia, Nicola (1893). Storia della città di Ariano dalla sua origine sino all'anno 1893. (in Italian) Ariano di Puglia: Tipografia Marino, 1893.
- Kamp, Norbert (1973). Kirche und Monarchie im staufischen Königreich Sizilien: Prosopographische Grundlegung; Bistümer und Bischöfe des Königreichs 1194-1266. 1. (in German). Münster: W. Fink, 1973. (pp. 223 ff.)
- Kehr, Paul Fridolin (1962). Regesta pontificum Romanorum. Italia pontificia, Vol.IX: Samnium—Apulia—Lucania. ed. Walter Holtzmann. Berlin: Weidemann. (in Latin) pp. 137–139.
- Massa, Paola (2014). "Vivere «secundum Langnobardorum legem» ad Ariano Irpino tra X e XII secolo." (in Italian). In: Scrineum Rivista 11 (Firenze: Firenze UP 2014), pp. 1–124.
- Mattei-Cerasoli, L. (1918), "Di alcuni vescovi poco noti," (in Italian), in: Archivio storico per le provincie Napolitane XLIII (n.s. IV 1918), pp. 363–382.
- Schiavo, Norma (2018). La chiesa di Ariano nel Medioevo e i suoi Santi Patroni. (in Italian). Mnamon, 2018.
- Ughelli, Ferdinando; Coleti, Nicolaus (1721). Italia sacra, sive de episcopis Italiae, et insularum adjacentium (in Latin). Vol. Tomus octavus (8). Venezia: Apud Sebastianum Coleti. pp. 212–224.
- Gams, Pius Bonifatius (1873). Series episcoporum Ecclesiae catholicae: quotquot innotuerunt a beato Petro apostolo (in Latin). Ratisbon: Typis et Sumptibus Georgii Josephi Manz.
- Vitale, Tommaso (1794). Storia della regia città di Ariano e sua diocesi. (in Italian).Roma: Salomoni 1794.
