= Andrés Aguado de Valdés =

17th-century Roman Catholic bishop

Most Reverend Andrés Aguado de Valdés
- Bishop of Ariano
- Church: Catholic Church
- Diocese: Diocese of Ariano
- In office: 1642–1645
- Predecessor: Paolo Cajatia
- Successor: Alessandro Rossi

Orders
- Consecration: 1 Jun 1642 by Pier Luigi Carafa (seniore)

Personal details
- Born: 1592 Valladolid, Spain
- Died: 10 Jul 1645 (age 53)

Andrés Aguado de Valdés, O.S.A. (1592–1645) was a Roman Catholic prelate who served as Bishop of Ariano (1642–1645).

== Biography ==
Andrés Aguado de Valdés was born in 1592 in Valladolid, Spain and ordained a priest in the Order of Saint Augustine. On 26 May 1642, he was appointed during the papacy of Pope Urban VIII as Bishop of Ariano. On 1 Jun 1642, he was consecrated bishop by Pier Luigi Carafa (seniore), Bishop of Tricarico. He served as Bishop of Ariano until his death.

== External links and additional sources ==
- Cheney, David M. "Diocese of Ariano Irpino-Lacedonia". Catholic-Hierarchy.org. (for Chronology of Bishops) ^{[self-published]}
- Chow, Gabriel. "Diocese of Ariano Irpino–Lacedonia". GCatholic.org. (for Chronology of Bishops) ^{[self-published]}

Catholic Church titles
Preceded by Paolo Cajatia	Bishop of Ariano; 1642–1645	Succeeded by Alessandro Rossi
