= Francesco Marino =

Italian Catholic bishop

His Excellency, The Most Reverend Francesco Marino
- Bishop of Nola
- Diocese: Nola
- Appointed: 11 November 2016
- Predecessor: Beniamino Depalma
- Previous post: Bishop of Avellino (2004–2016)

Orders
- Ordination: 6 October 1979
- Consecration: 8 January 2005 by Crescenzio Cardinal Sepe

Personal details
- Born: 24 November 1955 (age 70) Cesa, Campania
- Denomination: Roman Catholic
- Motto: In illo uno unum
- Coat of arms: Francesco Marino's coat of arms

Ordination history
History
Episcopal consecration
- Principal consecrator: Crescenzio Cardinal Sepe
- Co-consecrators: Mario Milano; Antonio Forte
Episcopal succession
Bishops consecrated by Francesco Marino as principal consecrator
- Sergio Melillo: 31 July 2015

Francesco Marino is an Italian ordinary of the Catholic Church and the former Bishop of Avellino.

== Biography ==
Francesco Marino was born in Cesa, a comune in Campania, Italy. He studied at the Campano Interregional Pontifical Seminary of Naples (Posillipo) and was ordained a priest on 6 October 1979 in the Diocese of Aversa.

On 13 November 2004, Pope John Paul II appointed him the Bishop of Avellino, succeeding Antonio Forte, who retired due to age. He was consecrated in the Aversa Cathedral on 8 January 2005 by Crescenzio Cardinal Sepe. and co-consecrators Mario Milano and Antonio Forte. He took the Latin motto "nos multi in illo uno unum."

On 31 July 2015, he served as principal consecrator of Sergio Melillo.

In 2011, he was elected to the Episcopal Commission for the Campano Interregional Pontifical Seminary of Naples (Posillipo).

On 11 November 2016, Marino was appointed the Bishop of Nola, succeeding Bishop Beniamino Depalma.

Catholic Church titles
Preceded by Antonio Forte	Bishop of Avellino; 2004–2016	Succeeded by Arturo Aiello
Preceded by Beniamino Depalma	Bishop of Nola; 2016–present	Incumbent
