= Paolo Cajatia =

17th-century Roman Catholic bishop

Most Reverend Paolo Cajatia
- Bishop of Ariano
- Church: Catholic Church
- Diocese: Diocese of Ariano
- In office: 1624–1638
- Predecessor: Ottavio Ridolfi
- Successor: Andrés Aguado de Valdés

Personal details
- Born: 1573
- Died: March 1638 (aged 64–65)

Paolo Cajatia (1573–1638) was a Roman Catholic prelate who served as Bishop of Ariano (1624–1638).

== Biography ==
Paolo Cajatia was born in 1573. On 15 Apr 1624, he was appointed during the papacy of Pope Urban VIII as Bishop of Ariano. He served as Bishop of Ariano until his death in Mar 1638.

== External links and additional sources ==
- Cheney, David M. "Diocese of Ariano Irpino-Lacedonia". Catholic-Hierarchy.org. (for Chronology of Bishops) ^{[self-published]}
- Chow, Gabriel. "Diocese of Ariano Irpino–Lacedonia". GCatholic.org. (for Chronology of Bishops) ^{[self-published]}

Catholic Church titles
Preceded by Ottavio Ridolfi	Bishop of Ariano; 1624–1638	Succeeded by Andrés Aguado de Valdés
