= Ottaviano Preconio =

Roman Catholic prelate

Most Reverend Ottaviano Preconio
- Archbishop of Palermo
- Church: Catholic Church
- Archdiocese: Archdiocese of Palermo
- Diocese: ʘ
- In office: 1562–1568
- Predecessor: Francisco Orozco de Arce
- Successor: Juan Segría
- Previous post: Bishop of Ariano (1561–1562)

Personal details
- Died: 18 August 1568 Palermo, Italy

Ottaviano Preconio, O.F.M. Conv. or Praeconio (died 18 August 1568) was a Roman Catholic prelate who served as Archbishop of Palermo (1562–1568) and Bishop of Ariano (1561–1562).

== Biography ==
Ottaviano Preconio was ordained a priest in the Order of Friars Minor Conventual.

On 13 June 1561, he was appointed during the papacy of Pope Pius IV as Bishop of Ariano. On 18 March 1562, he was appointed during the papacy of Pope Pius IV as Archbishop of Palermo. He served as Archbishop of Palermo until his death on 18 August 1568.

== External links and additional sources ==
- Cheney, David M. "Diocese of Ariano Irpino-Lacedonia". Catholic-Hierarchy.org. (for Chronology of Bishops) ^{[self-published]}
- Chow, Gabriel. "Diocese of Ariano Irpino–Lacedonia". GCatholic.org. (for Chronology of Bishops) ^{[self-published]}
- Cheney, David M. "Archdiocese of Palermo". Catholic-Hierarchy.org. (for Chronology of Bishops) ^{[self-published]}
- Chow, Gabriel. "Metropolitan Archdiocese of Palermo (Italy)". GCatholic.org. (for Chronology of Bishops) ^{[self-published]}

Catholic Church titles
| Preceded by Diomede Carafa | Bishop of Ariano; 1561–1562 | Succeeded by Donato Laurenti |
| Preceded by Francisco Orozco de Arce | Archbishop of Palermo; 1562–1568 | Succeeded by Juan Segría |
