= Emmanuele Brancaccio =

Most Reverend Emmanuele Brancaccio
- Bishop of Ariano
- Church: Catholic Church
- Diocese: Diocese of Ariano
- In office: 1667–1686
- Predecessor: Luis Morales (bishop)
- Successor: Juan Bonilla (bishop)

Personal details
- Died: 1686 Ariano, Kingdom of Naples

Emmanuele Brancaccio, O.S.B. (died 1686) was a Roman Catholic prelate who served as Bishop of Ariano (1667–1686).

== Biography ==
Emmanuele Brancaccio was ordained a priest in the Order of Saint Benedict. On 6 March 1667, he was appointed during the papacy of Pope Alexander VII as Bishop of Ariano. He served as Bishop of Ariano until his death in 1686.

== Episcopal succession ==
While bishop, he was the principal co-consecrator of:

- Marcantonio Vincentini, Bishop of Foligno (1669);
- Filippo Alferio Ossorio, Bishop of Fondi (1669); and
- Fulgenzio Arminio Monforte, Bishop of Nusco (1669).

== External links and additional sources ==
- Cheney, David M. "Diocese of Ariano Irpino-Lacedonia". Catholic-Hierarchy.org. (for Chronology of Bishops) ^{[self-published]}
- Chow, Gabriel. "Diocese of Ariano Irpino–Lacedonia". GCatholic.org. (for Chronology of Bishops) ^{[self-published]}

Catholic Church titles
Preceded by Luis Morales (bishop)	Bishop of Ariano; 1667–1686	Succeeded by Juan Bonilla (bishop)
