= Diomede Carafa (cardinal) =

Most Reverend Diomede Carafa
- Cardinal-Priest of San Pier Damiani ai Monti di San Paolo
- Church: Catholic Church

Orders
- Created cardinal: 20 Dec 1555
- Rank: Cardinal-Priest

Personal details
- Born: 7 Jan 1492 Ariano, Italy
- Died: 12 Aug 1560 (age 68) Rome, Italy

Diomede Carafa (1492–1560) was an Italian Roman Catholic bishop and cardinal.

== Biography ==
A member of the House of Carafa, Diomede Carafa was born in Ariano on 7 January 1492, the son of the noble House of Carafa. He was a relative of Giovanni Pietro Carafa, who became Pope Paul IV.

After studying law, he worked for various Roman tribunals.

On 9 April 1511 he was elected Bishop of Ariano, with dispensation for not having reached the canonical age or having received Holy Orders.

Pope Paul IV made him a cardinal priest in the consistory of 20 December 1555. He received the red hat and the titular church of San Martino ai Monti on 13 January 1556.

He participated in the papal conclave of 1559 that elected Pope Pius IV.

He died in Rome on 12 August 1560. He was buried in his titular church.

Catholic Church titles
| Preceded by Nicola Ippoliti | Bishop of Ariano; 1511–1560 | Succeeded by Ottaviano Preconio |
| Preceded by Girolamo Verallo | Cardinal-Priest of San Pier Damiani ai Monti di San Paolo; 1556–1560 | Succeeded by Charles Borromeo |
