= Pedro Flores (bishop) =

Roman Catholic prelate and bishop

Most Reverend Pedro Flores
- Bishop of Gaeta
- Church: Catholic Church
- Diocese: Diocese of Gaeta
- In office: 1537–1540
- Predecessor: Esteban Gabriel Merino
- Successor: Antonio Lunello
- Previous post: Bishop of Castellammare di Stabia (1502–1537)

Personal details
- Died: 3 May 1540 Gaeta, Italy

Pedro Flores (? – 3 May 1540) was a Roman Catholic prelate who served as Bishop of Gaeta (1537–1540) and Bishop of Castellammare di Stabia (1502–1537).

== Biography ==
On 26 November 1502, Pedro Flores was selected as Bishop of Castellammare di Stabia and confirmed by Pope Julius II on 29 November 1503.

On 31 January 1537, he was transferred by Pope Paul III to the diocese of Gaeta.

He served as Bishop of Gaeta until his death on 3 May 1540.

== Episcopal succession ==
While bishop, he was the principal co-consecrator of:

- Paolo Giovio (il Vecchio), Bishop of Nocera de' Pagani (1533);
- Marcantonio della Croce, Bishop of Tivoli (1533);
- Bernardo Antonio de' Medici, Bishop of Forlì (1533);
- Braccio Martelli, Bishop of Fiesole (1533);
- Bartolomeo Ferratini, Bishop of Sora (1533); and
- Sebastiano de Bonfilii, Bishop of Telese o Cerreto Sannita (1533).

== External links and additional sources ==
- Cheney, David M. "Diocese of Castellammare di Stabia". Catholic-Hierarchy.org. (for Chronology of Bishops) ^{[self-published]}
- Chow, Gabriel. "Diocese of Castellammare di Stabia (Italy)". GCatholic.org. (for Chronology of Bishops) ^{[self-published]}
- Cheney, David M. "Archdiocese of Gaeta". Catholic-Hierarchy.org. (for Chronology of Bishops) ^{[self-published]}
- Chow, Gabriel. "Archdiocese of Gaeta (Italy)". GCatholic.org. (for Chronology of Bishops) ^{[self-published]}
- Cheney, David M. "Archdiocese of Gaeta". Catholic-Hierarchy.org. (for Chronology of Bishops) ^{[self-published]}
- Chow, Gabriel. "Archdiocese of Gaeta (Italy)". GCatholic.org. (for Chronology of Bishops) ^{[self-published]}

Catholic Church titles
Preceded by Antonio Flores	Bishop of Castellammare di Stabia; 1502–1537	Succeeded by Juan Fonseca
Preceded by Esteban Gabriel Merino	Bishop of Gaeta; 1537–1540	Succeeded by Antonio Lunello
