= Ottavio Ridolfi =

17th-century Catholic cardinal

His Eminence Ottavio Ridolfi
- Cardinal-Priest of Sant'Agata de' Goti; Bishop of Agrigento
- Church: Catholic Church

Orders
- Consecration: 21 Oct 1612 by Giovanni Garzia Mellini

Personal details
- Born: 24 Mar 1582 Rome, Italy
- Died: 6 Jul 1624 (age 42)

Ottavio Ridolfi (1582–1624) was a Roman Catholic cardinal.

On 21 Oct 1612, he was consecrated bishop by Giovanni Garzia Mellini, Cardinal-Priest of Santi Quattro Coronati, with Alessandro Ludovisi, Archbishop of Bologna, and Lorenzo Landi, Bishop of Fossombrone, serving as co-consecrators.

== Episcopal succession ==
While bishop, he was the principal co-consecrator of:

- Camillo Moro, Bishop of Termoli (1612);
- Luigi Capponi, Archbishop of Ravenna (1621); and
- Ludovico Ludovisi, Archbishop of Bologna (1621).

Catholic Church titles
Preceded by Vittorino Mansi	Bishop of Ariano; 1612–1623	Succeeded by Paolo Cajatia
Preceded by Andrea Baroni Peretti Montalto	Cardinal-Priest of Sant'Agnese in Agone; 1622–1623	Succeeded by Girolamo Colonna
Preceded by Vincenzo Bonincontro	Bishop of Agrigento; 1623–1624	Succeeded by Francesco Traina
Preceded by Marco Antonio Gozzadini	Cardinal-Priest of Sant'Agata de' Goti; 1623–1624	Succeeded by Francesco Barberini (seniore)
