= Alfonso Herrera (bishop) =

Roman Catholic bishop

Most Reverend Alfonso Herrera
- Bishop of Ariano
- Church: Catholic Church
- Diocese: Diocese of Ariano
- In office: 1585–1602
- Predecessor: Donato Laurenti
- Successor: Vittorino Mansi
- Previous post: Bishop of Gallipoli (1576–1585)

Personal details
- Died: 20 December 1602 Ariano, Kingdom of Naples

Alfonso Herrera, O.S.A. (died 2 December 1602) was a Roman Catholic prelate who served as Bishop of Ariano (1585–1602) and Bishop of Gallipoli (1576–1585).

== Biography ==
Alfonso Herrera was born in Spain and ordained a priest in the Order of Saint Augustine. On 30 July 1576, Alfonso Herrera was appointed during the papacy of Pope Gregory XIII as Bishop of Gallipoli. On 25 February 1585, he was transferred by Pope Gregory XIII to the diocese of Ariano. He served as Bishop of Ariano until his death on 20 December 1602.

== See also ==
- Catholic Church in Italy

== External links and additional sources ==
- Cheney, David M. "Diocese of Ariano Irpino-Lacedonia". Catholic-Hierarchy.org. (for Chronology of Bishops) ^{[self-published]}
- Chow, Gabriel. "Diocese of Ariano Irpino–Lacedonia". GCatholic.org. (for Chronology of Bishops) ^{[self-published]}
- Cheney, David M. "Diocese of Gallipoli". Catholic-Hierarchy.org. (for Chronology of Bishops) ^{[self-published]}
- Chow, Gabriel. "Diocese of Gallipoli (Italy)". GCatholic.org. (for Chronology of Bishops) ^{[self-published]}

Catholic Church titles
Preceded by Giovanni Francesco Cibo	Bishop of Gallipoli; 1576–1585	Succeeded by Sebastián Quintero Ortiz
Preceded by Donato Laurenti	Bishop of Ariano; 1585–1602	Succeeded by Vittorino Mansi
