= Francesco Traina =

Catholic bishop (1578–1651)

Most Reverend Francesco Traina
- Bishop of Agrigento
- Church: Catholic Church
- Diocese: Diocese of Agrigento
- In office: 1627–1651
- Predecessor: Ottavio Ridolfi
- Successor: Ferdinando Sánchez de Cuéllar

Orders
- Consecration: 14 March 1627

Personal details
- Born: 1578 Palermo, Italy
- Died: October 1651 (age 73) Agrigento, Italy

Francesco Traina (1578–1651) was a Catholic prelate who served as Bishop of Agrigento (1627–1651).

He was born in Palermo, Italy in 1578. On 2 March 1627, he was appointed during the papacy of Pope Urban VIII as Bishop of Agrigento. On 14 March 1627, he was consecrated bishop by Cosimo de Torres, Bishop of Perugia. He served as Bishop of Agrigento until his death in October 1651.

== External links and additional sources ==
- Cheney, David M. "Archdiocese of Agrigento". Catholic-Hierarchy.org. (for Chronology of Bishops)^{[self-published]}
- Chow, Gabriel. "Metropolitan Archdiocese of Agrigento (Italy)". GCatholic.org. (for Chronology of Bishops) ^{[self-published]}

Catholic Church titles
Preceded by Ottavio Ridolfi	Bishop of Agrigento; 1627–1651	Succeeded by Ferdinando Sánchez de Cuéllar
