= Vittorino Mansi =

Roman Catholic prelate

Most Reverend Vittorino Mansi
- Bishop of Ariano
- Church: Catholic Church
- Diocese: Diocese of Ariano
- In office: 1602–161
- Predecessor: Alfonso Herrera (bishop)
- Successor: Ottavio Ridolfi

Orders
- Consecration: 7 February 1599 by Ottavio Paravicini

Personal details
- Died: 3 April 1611 Ariano, Kingdom of Naples

Vittorino Mansi OSB (died 3 April 1611) was a Roman Catholic prelate who served as Bishop of Ariano (1602–1611) and Bishop of Castellammare di Stabia (1599–1600).

== Biography ==
Vittorino Mansi was ordained a priest in the Order of Saint Benedict. On 1 February 1599, he was appointed during the papacy of Pope Clement VIII as Bishop of Castellammare di Stabia. On 7 February 1599, he was consecrated bishop by Ottavio Paravicini, Cardinal-Priest of Santi Bonifacio ed Alessio, with Properzio Resta, Bishop of Cariati e Cerenzia, and Alessandro de Franceschi, Bishop Emeritus of Forlì, serving as co-consecrators. On 31 July 1600, he was appointed during the papacy of Pope Clement VIII as Coadjutor Bishop of Ariano.

On 20 December 1602, he succeeded to the bishopric. He served as Bishop of Ariano until his death on 3 April 1611.

Catholic Church titles
Preceded by Giovanni Myra	Bishop of Castellammare di Stabia; 1599–1600	Succeeded by Jerónimo Bernardo de Quirós
Preceded by Alfonso Herrera (bishop)	Bishop of Ariano; 1602–1611	Succeeded by Ottavio Ridolfi
