= Juan Bonilla (bishop) =

Most Reverend Juan Bonilla
- Bishop of Ariano
- Church: Catholic Church
- Diocese: Diocese of Ariano
- In office: 1689–1696
- Predecessor: Emmanuele Brancaccio
- Successor: Giacinto della Calce

Orders
- Consecration: 6 March 1689 by Galeazzo Marescotti

Personal details
- Born: 19 April 1636 Valladolid, Spain
- Died: April 1696 (aged 59–60) Ariano, Kingdom of Naples

Juan Bonilla, O. Carm. (19 April 1636 – April 1696) was a Roman Catholic prelate who served as Bishop of Ariano (1689–1696).

== Biography ==
Juan Bonilla was born in Valladolid, Spain on 19 April 1636 and ordained a priest in the Order of Carmelites. On 28 February 1689, he was appointed during the papacy of Pope Innocent XI as Bishop of Ariano. On 6 March 1689, he was consecrated bishop by Galeazzo Marescotti, Cardinal-Priest of Santi Quirico e Giulitta, with Alberto Mugiasca, Bishop of Alessandria della Paglia, and Alberto Sebastiano Botti, Bishop of Albenga, serving as co-consecrators. He served as Bishop of Ariano until his death April 1696.

== See also ==
- Catholic Church in Italy

== External links and additional sources ==
- Cheney, David M. "Diocese of Ariano Irpino-Lacedonia". Catholic-Hierarchy.org. (for Chronology of Bishops) ^{[self-published]}
- Chow, Gabriel. "Diocese of Ariano Irpino–Lacedonia". GCatholic.org. (for Chronology of Bishops) ^{[self-published]}

Catholic Church titles
Preceded by Emmanuele Brancaccio	Bishop of Ariano; 1689–1696	Succeeded by Giacinto della Calce
