= Carlo Rosini =

Roman Catholic Bishop and philologist

Most Reverend Carlo Rosini
- Bishop of Pozzuoli
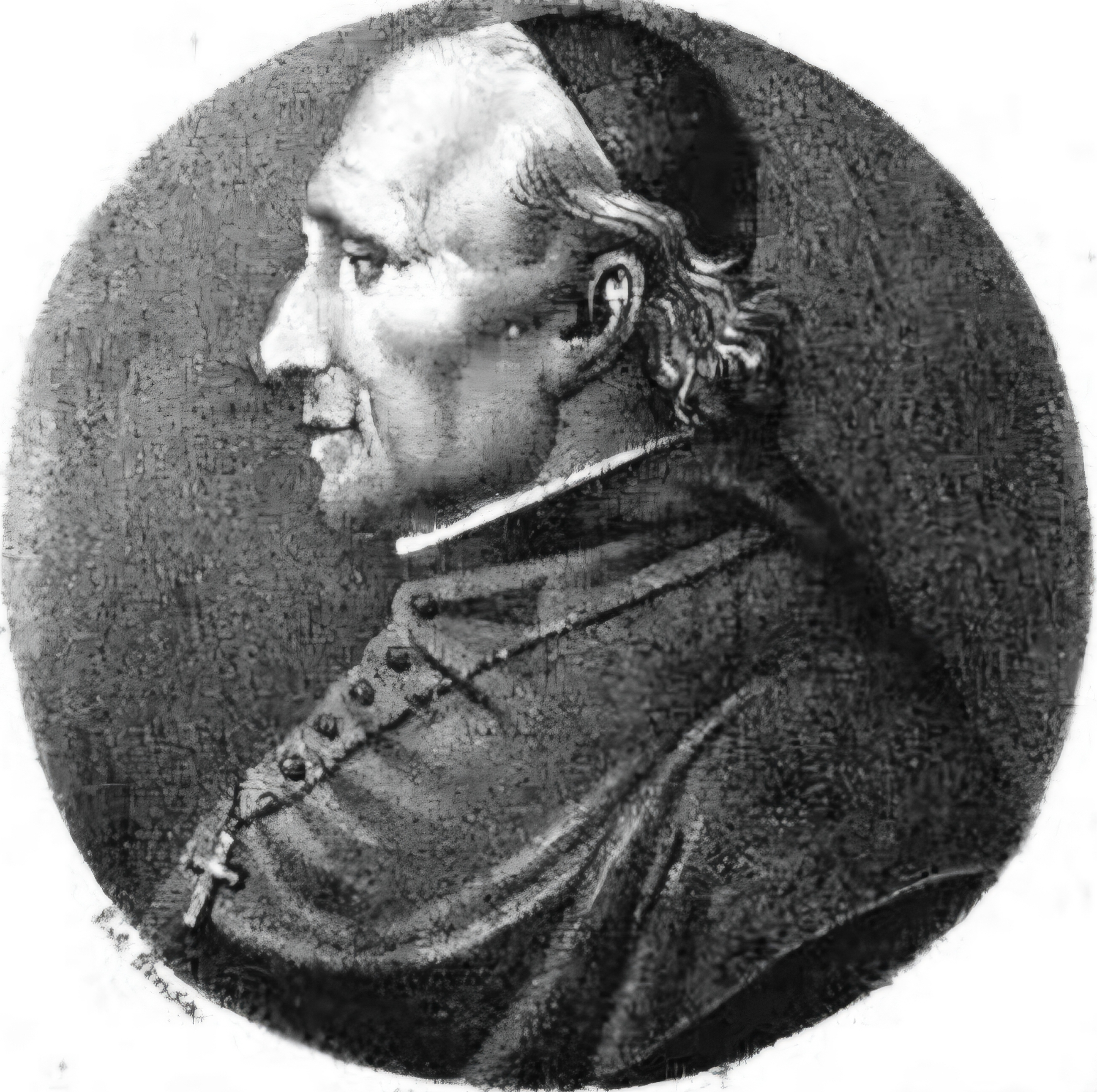
- Church: Catholic Church
- Diocese: Diocese of Pozzuoli
- In office: 1797–1836
- Predecessor: Gaetano Maria Capece
- Successor: Pietro Ignazio Marolda

Orders
- Ordination: 4 April 1772
- Consecration: 18 December 1797 by Giuseppe Doria Pamphili

Personal details
- Born: April 7, 1748 Naples, Kingdom of the Two Sicilies
- Died: 18 February 1836 (aged 87) Naples, Kingdom of the Two Sicilies

Carlo Maria Rosini (7 April 1748, in Naples – 18 February 1836, in Naples) was a Roman Catholic priest, bishop and philologist. Rosini worked on the carbonized papyrus scrolls found at Herculaneum, the first volume of which he helped publish in 1793.

== Biography ==
Carlo Maria Rosini studied under the Jesuits, embraced the ecclesiastical life, and in 1784 became the successor of Nicola Ignarra as professor of Holy Scripture in the archiepiscopal seminary at Naples. He was canon of Naples Cathedral till 1792. Pope Pius VI made him Bishop of Pozzuoli on 21 December 1797. He was in favor with the king, and received the position of Councilor of State and grand almoner, and later, under Ferdinand I, was minister of public instruction. Rosini was a member of the Royal Herculaneum Academy after its reorganization, and was one of the most active in deciphering ancient manuscripts, of which he published a great number. They are included in the Herculanensia Volumina (Naples, 1793). Rosini died at Naples on February 18, 1836. His works are all on archaeological subjects, the principal one being Dissertatio isagogica ad Herculanensium Voluminum explanationem (ibid. 1797), a long treatise about the excavations happening at Herculaneum.

== Bibliography ==
- This article incorporates public domain material from McClintock, John; Strong, James (1867–1887). Cyclopædia of Biblical, Theological and Ecclesiastical Literature. Harper and Brothers.
