= Donato Laurenti =

Roman Catholic prelate

Most Reverend Donato Laurenti
- Bishop of Ariano
- Church: Catholic Church
- Diocese: Diocese of Ariano
- In office: 1563–1584
- Predecessor: Ottaviano Preconio
- Successor: Alfonso Herrera (bishop)
- Previous post: Bishop of Minori (1557–1563)

Personal details
- Died: 1584 Ariano, Kingdom of Naples

Donato Laurenti (died 1584) was a Roman Catholic prelate who served as Bishop of Ariano (1563–1584) and Bishop of Minori (1557–1563).

== Biography ==
On 21 June 1557, Donato Laurenti was appointed during the papacy of Pope Paul IV as Bishop of Minori. On 29 January 1563, he was appointed during the papacy of Pope Pius IV as Bishop of Ariano. He served as Bishop of Ariano until his death in 1584.

== External links and additional sources ==
- Cheney, David M. "Diocese of Minori". Catholic-Hierarchy.org. (for Chronology of Bishops) ^{[self-published]}
- Chow, Gabriel. "Titular Episcopal See of Minori (Italy)". GCatholic.org. (for Chronology of Bishops) ^{[self-published]}
- Cheney, David M. "Diocese of Ariano Irpino-Lacedonia". Catholic-Hierarchy.org. (for Chronology of Bishops) ^{[self-published]}
- Chow, Gabriel. "Diocese of Ariano Irpino–Lacedonia". GCatholic.org. (for Chronology of Bishops) ^{[self-published]}

Catholic Church titles
Preceded by Pierre de Affatatis	Bishop of Minori; 1557–1563	Succeeded by Alessandro Mollo
Preceded by Ottaviano Preconio	Bishop of Ariano; 1563–1584	Succeeded by Alfonso Herrera (bishop)
