= Carlo Borromeo (bishop) =

Catholic bishop

Most Reverend Carlo Borromeo
- Bishop of Pozzuoli
- Church: Catholic Church
- Diocese: Diocese of Pozzuoli
- In office: 1537–1540
- Predecessor: Simeone de' Vernacoli
- Successor: Bernardino Castellari
- Previous post: Bishop of Ugento (1530–1537)

Personal details
- Died: 1540 Pozzuoli, Italy

Carlo Borromeo (died 1540) was a Roman Catholic prelate who served as Bishop of Pozzuoli (1537–1540) and Bishop of Ugento (1530–1537).

== Biography ==
On 9 March 1530, Carlo Borromeo was appointed during the papacy of Pope Clement VII as Bishop of Ugento. On 6 July 1537, he was appointed during the papacy of Pope Paul III as Bishop of Pozzuoli. He served as Bishop of Pozzuoli until his death in 1540.

== External links and additional sources ==
- Cheney, David M. "Diocese of Ugento–Santa Maria di Leuca". Catholic-Hierarchy.org. (for Chronology of Bishops) ^{[self-published]}
- Chow, Gabriel. "Diocese of Ugento–Santa Maria di Leuca (Italy)". GCatholic.org. (for Chronology of Bishops) ^{[self-published]}
- Cheney, David M. "Diocese of Pozzuoli". Catholic-Hierarchy.org. (for Chronology of Bishops) ^{[self-published]}
- Chow, Gabriel. "Diocese of Pozzuoli (Italy)". GCatholic.org. (for Chronology of Bishops) ^{[self-published]}

Catholic Church titles
| Preceded by Andreas | Bishop of Ugento; 1530–1537 | Succeeded by Bonaventura de S. Leone, O.Min.Obs. |
| Preceded by Simeone de' Vernacoli | Bishop of Pozzuoli; 1537–1540 | Succeeded by Bernardino Castellari |
