= Giacinto della Calce =

Roman Catholic prelate

Most Reverend Giacinto della Calce
- Bishop of Ariano
- Church: Catholic Church
- Diocese: Diocese of Ariano
- In office: 1697–1715
- Predecessor: Juan Bonilla (bishop)
- Successor: Filippo Tipaldi

Orders
- Consecration: 9 June 1697 by Sperello Sperelli

Personal details
- Born: 1 January 1649 Naples, Kingdom of Naples
- Died: 13 July 1715 (age 66) Ariano, Kingdom of Naples

Giacinto della Calce, C.R. (1 January 1649 – 13 July 1715) was a Roman Catholic prelate who served as Bishop of Ariano (1697–1715).

== Biography ==
Giacinto della Calce was born in Naples, Italy on 1 January 1649 and ordained a priest in the Congregation of Clerics Regular of the Divine Providence. On 3 June 1697, he was appointed during the papacy of Pope Innocent XII as Bishop of Ariano. On 9 June 1697, he was consecrated bishop by Sperello Sperelli, Bishop of Terni, with Michele de Bologna, Bishop of Isernia, and Matteo Gagliani, Bishop of Fondi, serving as co-consecrators. He served as Bishop of Ariano until his death on 13 July 1715.

== External links and additional sources ==
- Cheney, David M. "Diocese of Ariano Irpino-Lacedonia". Catholic-Hierarchy.org. (for Chronology of Bishops) ^{[self-published]}
- Chow, Gabriel. "Diocese of Ariano Irpino–Lacedonia". GCatholic.org. (for Chronology of Bishops) ^{[self-published]}

Catholic Church titles
Preceded by Juan Bonilla (bishop)	Bishop of Ariano; 1697–1715	Succeeded by Filippo Tipaldi
