= Paolo Bracchi =

Most Reverend Paolo Bracchi
- Bishop of Ariano
- Church: Catholic Church
- Diocese: Diocese of Ariano
- In office: 1481–1497
- Predecessor: Nicola Ippoliti
- Successor: Nicola Ippoliti

Personal details
- Died: 1497 Ariano, Kingdom of Naples

Paolo Bracchi (died 1497) was a Roman Catholic prelate who served as Bishop of Ariano (1481–1497).

== Biography ==
In 1481, he was appointed Bishop of Ariano by Pope Sixtus IV. He served as Bishop of Ariano until his death in 1497.

== External links and additional sources ==
- Eubel, Konrad (1914). Hierarchia catholica medii et recentioris aevi (in Latin). Vol. II (second ed.). Münster: Libreria Regensbergiana. p. 94.

Catholic Church titles
Preceded by Nicola Ippoliti	Bishop of Ariano; 1481–1497	Succeeded by Nicola Ippoliti
