= Alessandro Rossi (bishop of Ariano) =

Roman Catholic prelate (1589–1656)

Most Reverend Alessandro Rossi
- Bishop of Ariano
- Church: Catholic Church
- Diocese: Diocese of Ariano
- In office: 1650–1656
- Predecessor: Andrés Aguado de Valdés
- Successor: Luis Morales (bishop)

Orders
- Consecration: 24 February 1650 by Francesco Maria Brancaccio

Personal details
- Born: 1589 Naples, Kingdom of Naples
- Died: August 1656 (age 67) Ariano, Kingdom of Naples

Alessandro Rossi (1589–1656) was a Roman Catholic prelate who served as the Bishop of Ariano (1650–1656).

== Biography ==
Alessandro Rossi was born in Naples, Italy in 1589. On 14 February 1650, he was appointed during the papacy of Pope Innocent X as Bishop of Ariano. On 24 February 1650, he was consecrated bishop by Francesco Maria Brancaccio, Bishop of Viterbo e Tuscania. He served as Bishop of Ariano until his death in August 1656.

== External links and additional sources ==
- Cheney, David M. "Diocese of Ariano Irpino-Lacedonia". Catholic-Hierarchy.org. (for Chronology of Bishops) ^{[self-published]}
- Chow, Gabriel. "Diocese of Ariano Irpino–Lacedonia". GCatholic.org. (for Chronology of Bishops) ^{[self-published]}

Catholic Church titles
Preceded by Andrés Aguado de Valdés	Bishop of Ariano; 1650–1656	Succeeded by Luis Morales (bishop)
