= Antonio Forte =

Catholic bishop (1928–2006)

His Excellency, The Most Reverend Antonio Forte, OFM
- Bishop of Avellino
- Diocese: Diocese of Avellino
- Appointed: 20 February 1993
- Predecessor: Gerardo Pierro
- Successor: Francesco Marino
- Previous post: Bishop of Ariano Irpino-Lacedonia (1988–1993)

Orders
- Ordination: 25 February 1951
- Consecration: 10 September 1988 by Bernardin Cardinal Gantin

Personal details
- Born: 9 July 1928 Polla, Province of Salerno, Campania
- Died: 11 September 2006 (aged 78)
- Denomination: Roman Catholic

Antonio Forte, OFM (9 July 1928 – 11 September 2006) was an Italian ordinary of the Catholic Church and a Franciscan. He was the Bishop of Avellino and before that was the Bishop of Ariano Irpino-Lacedonia.

== Biography ==
On 1 October 1944, Forte entered the Order of Friars Minor and was ordained a Franciscan priest on 25 February 1951.

Following his position as provincial vicar and minister of the Franciscan order, he was appointed Bishop of Ariano Irpino-Lacedonia . He was consecrated a bishop on 10 September 1988, his consecrator being Bernardin Cardinal Gantin and co-consecrators Gioacchino Illiano, Bishop of Nocera Inferiore-Sarno and Nicola Agnozzi OFM Conv., Bishop of Ariano Irpino-Lacedonia.

On 20 February 1993, Forte was appointed Bishop of Avellino. He resigned due to age on 13 November 2004, assuming the title Bishop Emeritus of Avellino. He then moved to the convent of Bracigliano and, after surgery-related health problems, he moved to Santa Maria degli Angeli in Nocera Superiore, the location of the Franciscan provincial infirmary. On 11 September 2006, he died at the infirmary.

== See also ==
- Catholic Church in Italy

Catholic Church titles
Preceded by Nicola Agnozzi	Bishop of Ariano Irpino-Lacedonia; 1988–1993	Succeeded by Eduardo Davino
Preceded by Gerardo Pierro	Bishop of Avellino; 1993–2004	Succeeded by Francesco Marino
