= Silvio Padoin =

Italian Roman Catholic bishop (1930–2019)

Silvio Padoin (9 April 1930 – 31 October 2019) was an Italian Roman Catholic bishop.

Padoin was born in Pieve di Soligo, Italy, in April 1930 and was ordained to the priesthood in 1955. He was Bishop of the Roman Catholic Diocese of Pozzuoli, Italy, from 1993 to 2005.
