= Giovanni D'Alise =

Italian Roman Catholic bishop (1948–2020)

- Bishop
- Church: Roman Catholic Church
- Diocese: Diocese of Caserta
- Appointed: 2014
- Previous post: Bishop of Ariano Irpino-Lacedonia (2004–2014)

Orders
- Ordination: 1972

Personal details
- Born: January 14, 1948 Naples, Italy
- Died: October 4, 2020 (aged 72) Caserta, Italy
- Motto: Latin: Manete in dilectione mea (Translated: English: Remain in my love)
- Coat of arms

Giovanni D'Alise (14 January 1948 – 4 October 2020) was an Italian Roman Catholic bishop.

== Biography ==
D'Alise was born on 14 January 1948 in Naples, Italy. His mother Teresa Savino and his father Giuseppe D'Alise were farmers in San Felice a Cancello, where they were growing tomatoes, tobacco, corn and beans.

He received his licentiate from the Pontifical Theological Seminary of Southern Italy. He was ordained to the priesthood in 1972. He served as bishop of the Roman Catholic Diocese of Ariano Irpino-Lacedonia, Italy, from 2004 to 2014 and as bishop of the Roman Catholic Diocese of Caserta, Italy, from 2014 until his death in Caserta from COVID-19 during the COVID-19 pandemic in Italy.
