= Roman Catholic Diocese of Castellammare di Stabia =

Former Italian Catholic diocese

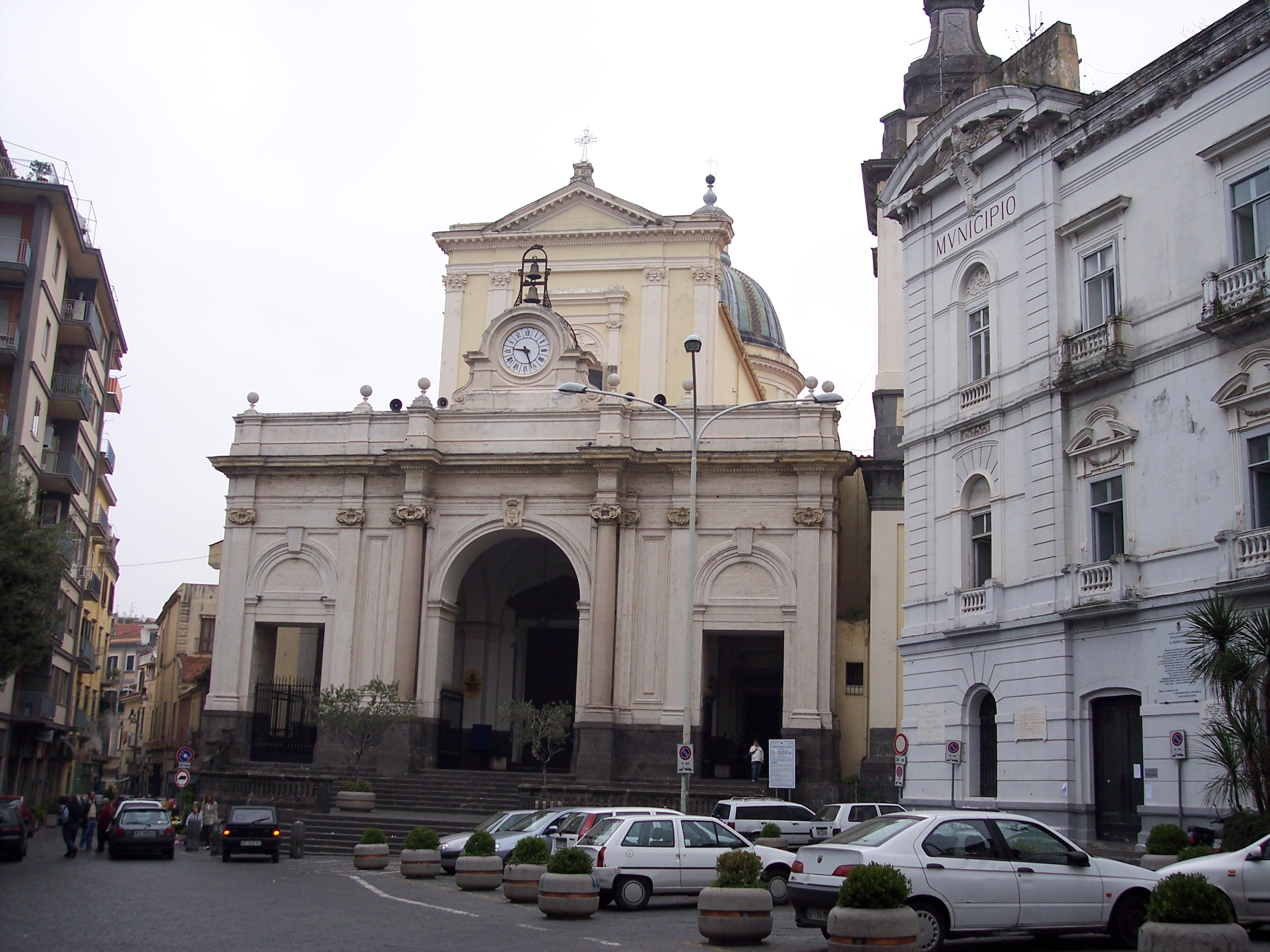
Cathedral of Castellammare

The Italian Catholic diocese of Castellammare di Stabia, on the Bay of Naples, existed until 1986. In that year it became part of the archdiocese of Sorrento-Castellammare di Stabia.

== History ==
Previous to Ursus, present at the Roman synod under Pope Symmachus, in 499, no register was kept of the bishops of this city. Among its bishops were:

- Palmerio (1196), champion of ecclesiastical rights against Emperor Frederick II;

and C. Vittorino Maso (1599), theologians and canonists;

=== Reorganization of 1818 ===
Following the extinction of the Napoleonic Kingdom of Italy, the Congress of Vienna authorized the restoration of the Papal States and the Kingdom of Naples. Since the French occupation had seen the abolition of many Church institutions in the kingdom, as well as the confiscation of most Church property and resources, it was imperative that Pope Pius VII and King Ferdinand IV reach agreement on restoration and restitution. Ferdinand, however, was not prepared to accept the pre-Napoleonic situation, in which Naples was a feudal subject of the papacy. Lengthy, detailed, and acrimonious negotiations ensued.

In 1818, a new concordat with the Kingdom of the Two Sicilies committed the pope to the suppression of more than fifty small dioceses in the kingdom. Pope Pius VII united the diocese of Lettere-Gragnano, the ancient Liternum with Castellammare.

=== Diocesan reorganization of 1986 ===
The Second Vatican Council (1962–1965), in order to ensure that all Catholics received proper spiritual attention, decreed the reorganization of the diocesan structure of Italy and the consolidation of small and struggling dioceses. It also recommended the abolition of anomalous units such as exempt territorial prelatures.

On 18 February 1984, the Vatican and the Italian State signed a new and revised concordat. Based on the revisions, a set of Normae was issued on 15 November 1984, which was accompanied in the next year, on 3 June 1985, by enabling legislation. According to the agreement, the practice of having one bishop govern two separate dioceses at the same time, aeque personaliter, was abolished. Instead, the Vatican continued consultations which had begun under Pope John XXIII for the merging of small dioceses, especially those with personnel and financial problems, into one combined diocese.

On 30 September 1986, Pope John Paul II ordered that the dioceses of Sorrento and Castellammare be merged into one diocese with one bishop, with the Latin title Archidioecesis Surrentina-Castri Maris. There was to be one episcopal seat, in Sorrento, the largest town and the civil provincial capital. The cathedral of the diocese of Castellammare was to become a co-cathedrals and its Chapter called a Chapter of the co-cathedral. The clergy and parishes of the individual suppressed dioceses were to become the clergy and parishes of the Diocese of Sorrento-Castellammare.

== Bishops of Castellamare di Stabia ==
=== to 1600 ===
...

- (ca. 499) : Ursus

...

- (600–612) : Laurentius

...

- (649) : Iuventinus

...

- (c. 827) : Catellus of Castellammare

...

- (1085) : Gregorius

...

- (1141) : Joannes

...

- (1327–1331) : Landolfo Caracciolo

...

- (1503–1537) : Pedro Flores
- (1537–1559) : Juan Fonseca
- (1562–1577) : Antonio Lauro

(1577–1581) : Sede Vacante

- (1581–1591) : Ludovico Majorino da Gravina
- (1591–1596) : Giovanni Myra (Mira)
- (1599–1600) : Vittorino Mansi

=== 1600 to 1800 ===
- (1601–1604) : Jerónimo Bernardo de Quirós
- (1605–1627) : Ippolito Riva
- (1627–1644) : Annibale Mascambruno
- (1645–1651) : Andrea Massa
- (1651–1653) : Clemente Del Pezzo
- (1655–1662) : Juan de Paredes
- (1662–1676) : Pietro Gambacorta
- (1676–1678) : Lorenzo Mayers Caramuel
- (1678–1680) : Salvatore Scaglione
- (1682–1683) : Francesco de Mandietta (Mendieta)
- (1684–1705) : Annibale de Pietropaulo
- (1713–1722) : Biagio de Dura
- (1722–1727) : Pietro Savastani
- (1727–1729) : Tommaso Di Grazia
- (1730–1743) : Tommaso Falcoia
- (1743–1749) : Pio Tommaso Milante
- (1749–1767) : Giuseppe Coppola
- (1768–1787) : Tommaso Mazza
- (1792–1800) : Ferdinando Crispo Doria

=== 1800 to 1986 ===
(1800–1818) : Sede vacante

- (1818–1820) : Bernardo Maria della Torre
- (1821–1836) : Francesco Colangelo
- (1837–1849) : Angelo Maria Scanzano
- (1850–1878) : Francesco Petagna
- (1879–1897) : Vincenzo Maria Sarnelli Appointed, Archbishop of Naples
- (1898–1921) : Michele de Jorio
- (1922–1923) : Uberto Maria Fiodo
- (1925–1936) : Pasquale Ragosta
- (1936–1952) : Federico Emanuel
- (1952–1966) : Agostino D’Arco

(1966–1971) : Sede vacante.

- Raffaele Pellecchia, Apostolic Administrator

- (1971–1977) : Raffaele Pellecchia
- (1977–1986) : Antonio Zama

On 30 September 1986, the dioceses of Sorrento and Castellammare were united.

== Archbishops of Sorrento-Castellammare di Stabia ==
Stemma of Archbishop Francesco Alfano

- (1977–1988) : Antonio Zama
- (1989–2012) : Felice Cece
- (2012–present) : Francesco Alfano

== See also ==
- Diocese of Lettere-Gragnano
- List of Catholic dioceses in Italy

== Books ==
- Cappelletti, Giuseppe (1864). Le chiese d'Italia: dalla loro origine sino ai nostri giorni (in Italian). Vol. Tomo decimonono (19). Venice: G. Antonelli. pp. 769–813.
- Eubel, Conradus, ed. (1913). Hierarchia catholica, Tomus 1 (second ed.). Münster: Libreria Regensbergiana. (in Latin)
- Eubel, Conradus, ed. (1914). Hierarchia catholica, Tomus 2 (second ed.). Münster: Libreria Regensbergiana.
- Gulik, Guilelmus (1923). Eubel, Conradus (ed.). Hierarchia catholica, Tomus 3 (second ed.). Münster: Libreria Regensbergiana.
- Gams, Pius Bonifatius (1873). Series episcoporum Ecclesiae catholicae: quotquot innotuerunt a beato Petro apostolo (in Latin). Ratisbon: Typis et Sumptibus Georgii Josephi Manz.
- Gauchat, Patritius (Patrice) (1935). Hierarchia catholica IV (1592-1667). Münster: Libraria Regensbergiana.
- Kehr, Paul Fridolin (1925). Italia pontificia Vol. VIII (Berlin: Weidmann 1925), pp. 412-417. (in Latin)
- Lanzoni, Francesco (1927). Le diocesi d'Italia dalle origini al principio del secolo VII (an. 604), vol. I, Faenza 1927, pP. 245-246.
- Liccardo, Giovanni (2008). Redemptor meus vivit: iscrizioni cristiane antiche dell'area napoletana. Istituto di storia del Cristianism della Pontificia Facolta Teologica dell' Italia Meridionale (in Italian). Naples: Il pozzo di Giacobbe. pp. 149–168. ISBN 978-88-6124-012-4. (an enthusiastic believer)
- Milante, Pio Tommaso (1750). De Stabiis, Stabiana ecclesia, et episcopis eius (in Latin). Naples: Typ. Mutiana.
- Milante, Pio Tommaso (1836). Della citta di Stabia, della chiesa stabiana, e de' suoi vescovi. Opera postuma di monsignor F. Pio Tommaso Milante ... tradotta dal latino: 2 (in Italian). Vol. Tomo II. Napoli: Saverio Giordano.
- Parisi, Catello (1842). Cenno storico-descrittivo della citta' di Castellammare di Stabia (in Italian). Firenze. pp. 90–95.
- Ritzler, Remigius; Sefrin, Pirminus (1952). Hierarchia catholica medii et recentis aevi V (1667-1730). Patavii: Messagero di S. Antonio.
- Ritzler, Remigius; Sefrin, Pirminus (1958). Hierarchia catholica medii et recentis aevi VI (1730-1799). Patavii: Messagero di S. Antonio.
