= Diocese of Pozzuoli =

Latin Catholic diocese in Italy

Coordinates: 40.8167°N 14.1167°E

Diocese of Pozzuoli Dioecesis Puteolana

Catholic

Location
- Country: Italy
- Ecclesiastical province: Naples

Statistics
- Area: 105 km^{2} (41 sq mi)
- Population: Total; Catholics: (as of 2019); 556,280; 539,950 (guess)
- Parishes: 69

Information
- Denomination: Catholic Church
- Sui iuris church: Latin Church
- Rite: Roman Rite
- Established: 1st Century
- Cathedral: Cattedrale di S. Proculo
- Secular priests: 89 (diocesan); 50 (Religious Orders); 40 Permanent Deacons

Current leadership
- Pope: Leo XIV
- Bishop: Carlo Villano
- Bishops emeritus: Gennaro Pascarella

Map
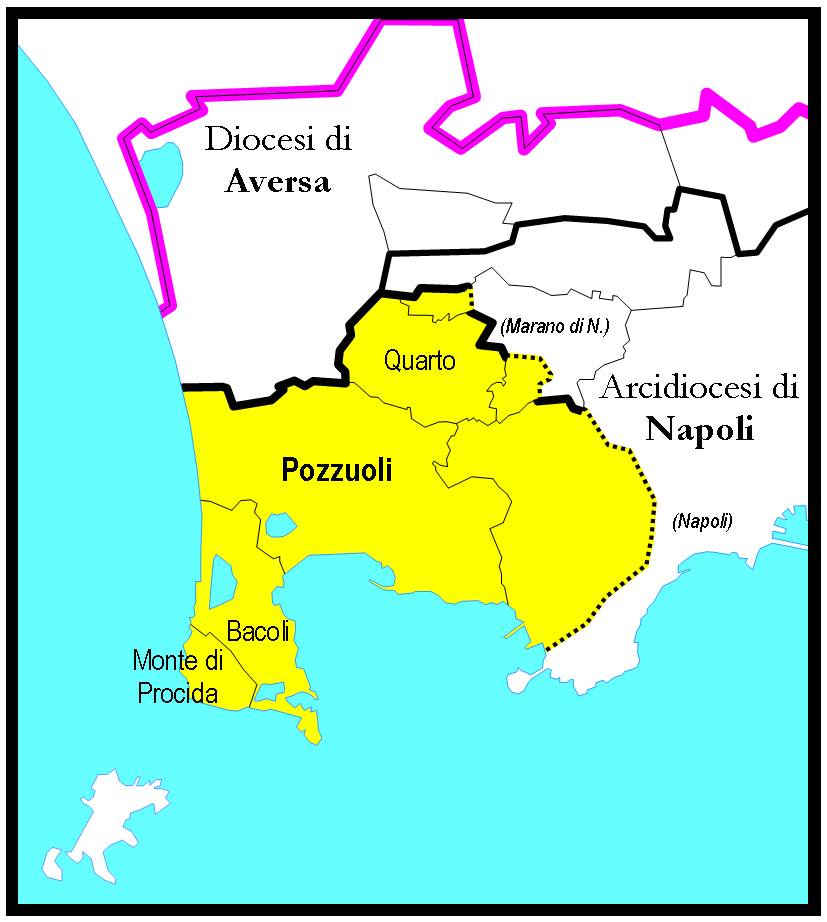

Website
- www.diocesipozzuoli.it

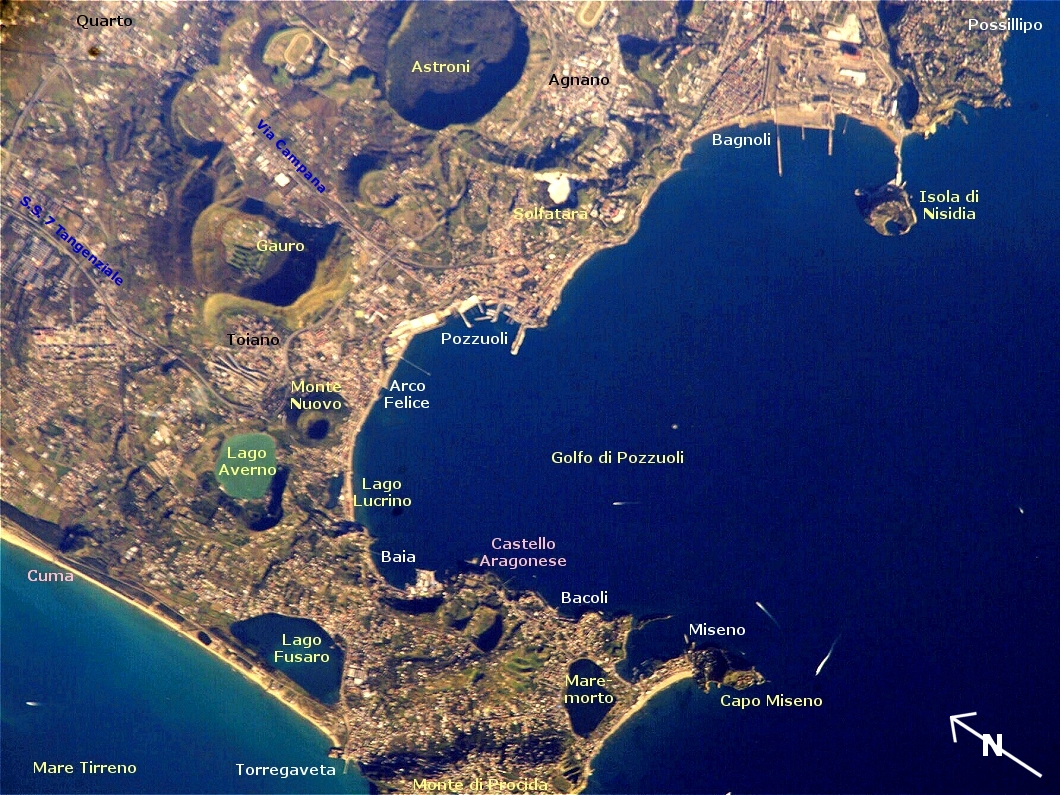

The Diocese of Pozzuoli (Latin: Dioecesis Puteolana) is a Latin diocese of the Catholic Church in Campania, southern Italy. It is a suffragan in the ecclesiastical province of the metropolitan Archdiocese of Naples, like its other neighboring dioceses, Aversa and Ischia.

== History ==
The diocese of Pozzuoli is said to have been founded around 100 AD. The conjecture is based on the fact that Paul of Tarsus landed at Pozzuoli on his way to trial in Rome (Acts of the Apostles 28:13-14), and the fact that Ignatius of Antioch, when being conducted to Rome, landed in Pozzuoli. Neither reference proves the existence of a diocese, or even an established community.

Proculus, Acutius, Eutyches and Artemas were martyrs of Pozzuoli, and St. Januarius of Benevento and his companions suffered martyrdom here.

In 1198, the Solfatera volcano, which is less than two miles west of the cathedral of Pozzuoli, exploded violently, and the earth tremors damaged every building in Pozzuoli.

In the 12th century, piracy increased considerably in the Tyrrhenian Sea. Some pirate bands captured Cumae, fortified its castello, and made it the headquarters of their activities. The bishops of Aversa, who were frequent targets, appealed to Naples for assistance, and, in 1207, obtained the aid of the military captain Goffredo de Montefuscolo, who sent aid from Naples, led by Pietro di Lettra. The pirates were scattered, and the town and castello of Cumae were taken and completely destroyed. The Archbishop of Naples recovered and removed the sacred relics, the head of the cathedral chapter of Cumae, the Primicerius, was incorporated into the diocese of Aversa, and the diocese of Aversa and the diocese of Pozzuoli gained territory from the suppressed Diocese of Cuma (Italy). The archbishops of Naples permanently assumed the title of bishops of Cumae.

In 1536, a series of earthquakes began in the neighborhood of Pozzuoli, culminating in the explosions of 26 and 27 September 1538, which brought into existence a new volcano only two miles west of the cathedral, called Monte Nuovo. Just before the explosion the sea receded from the beach by two hundred feet. Virtually every building in the area was damaged.

In 2016, there was one Catholic priest for every 4,119 Catholics.

== Cathedral ==
The seat of the bishop is in Pozzuoli Cathedral, dedicated to the local martyr Proculus of Pozzuoli. By the 6th century, the Temple of Augustus, a building consisting principally of marble, had been converted for use as the Christian cathedral. In the 17th century, Bishop Martín de León Cárdenas (1631–1650) had the old cathedral restored by enclosing it entirely in a baroque structure, which survived until 1964. The cathedral was closed after a major fire in 1964 but reopened for worship in 2014, though in 2019 it is still open only on Saturdays and Sundays, due to archaeological and restoration work on the Temple of Augustus. During that building's closure the nearby church of Santa Maria della Consolazione in Pozzuoli served as a pro-cathedral.

The cathedral is administered and served by a Chapter, consisting of three dignities (the Dean, the Archdeacon, and the Cantor) and twelve Canons. In 1775, there were four dignities.

On 7 May 1300, the Canons of Pozzuoli surrendered their right to elect their bishop to Pope Boniface VIII.

The diocese's Co-Cathedral in Monterusciello is the Concattedrale di S. Paolo Apostolo, devoted to St. Paul the Apostle.

A diocesan synod was held by Bishop Martín de León Cárdenas (1631 –1650))

== Bishops of Pozzuoli ==
=== to 1300 ===
...
[Celsus]
...
[Joannes]
...

- Florentius (attested 372–378)

...

- Theodorus (435)

...

- Julius (or Julianus) (attested 448–449)

...
[Stephanus]
[Claudius]
...

- Aucupius (attested 499)
- Geminus (attested 558–560)

...

- Anonymous (attested 600)

...

- [Zosimus] (7th century)

...

- Gaudiosus (attested 680)

...

- Stephanus (10th century)

...

- Leo (attested c. 1030)

...

- Donatus (attested 1119, 1121)

...

- Maurus (attested 1135)

...

- Joannes (attested 1153)

...

- M. (attested 1187, 1193)

...

- Richardus (attested 1235)

...

- Matthaeus (attested 1274)
- Angelus (attested 1275, 1277, 1279)
- Franciscus (attested 1282)
- Angelus (attested 1284)
- Arnaldus (attested 1296)
- Joannes Brito (attested 1298–1304)

=== from 1300 to 1600 ===
- Franciscus (attested 1304)
- Nicolaus Scandito (attested 1308)
- Guilelmus de Sallone, O.Min. (attested 1317)
- Paulinus of Venice, O.Min. (1324–1344)
- Landulfus Capecelatro (1344–1373)
- Ludovico de Casalibus (1373–1380)
- Petrus (1380–1385) Avignon Obedience
- Petrus de Trara (1385–1389?) Avignon Obedience
- Nicolaus (c. 1389) Roman Obedience
- Francesco Cecchus (c. 1391) Roman Obedience
- Philippus (1395–1398) Roman Obedience
- Ludovicus (Loysius) Roman Obedience
- Simon Alopa (de Lopa) (1401) Roman Obedience
- Tommaso Torelli (1401–1405)
- Tommaso Brancaccio (Jan – Jul 1405)
- Lorenzo di Gillioto (1405–1434)
- Matteo Custoni (1434)
- Lorenzo da Napoli, O.Min. (1435–1447)

Ludovico di Costanzo (1442–1447) usurper

- Ludovico (or Angelo) di Costanzo (1447–1465)
  Administrator or Bishop
- Tommaso Carafa (1470–1473)
- Pirro de Azzia (1473–1493)
- Jacopo Orsini (1493–1494?)
- Antonio Giaconi (1494–1514)
- Cardinal Bernardo Dovizi da Bibbiena (1514–1515) Administrator
- Simeone de' Vernacoli (6 Jul 1515 – 1537 Died)
- Carlo Borromeo (1537–1540)
- Bernardino Castellari (17 Aug 1540 – 1542 Resigned)
- Gian Matteo Castaldo, O.S.B. (1542–1586)
- Leonardo Vairo, O.S.B. (1587 – 4 Jan 1603)

=== since 1600 ===
- Jerónimo Bernardo de Quirós, O. Praem. (1604–1616?)
- Lorenzo Monzonís Galatina, O.F.M. (1617–1630)
- Martín de León Cárdenas, O.S.A. (7 Apr 1631 –1650)

Sede vacante (1650–1653)

- Juan Bautista Verchi de Campania (Visco), O.F.M. (6 Oct 1653 – 1663 Died)
- Benedicto Sánchez de Herrera (24 Mar 1664 – 14 Jun 1674 Died)
- Carlo della Palma, C.R. (27 May 1675 – 1682 Died)
- Diego Ibáñez de la Madrid y Bustamente (2 Oct 1684 –1687)
- Domenico Maria Marchese, O.P. (31 May 1688 – May 1692)
- José Sanz de Villaragut, O.F.M. (2 Jan 1693 –1696)
- Carlo Cuzzolini (25 Feb 1697 – Aug 1698)
- Giuseppe Falces, O.F.M. (11 Apr 1699 – Nov 1703)
- Michele Petirro (14 Dec 1705 – 24 Apr 1709)

Sede vacante (1709–1713)

- Pietro Cavalcanti, C.R. (22 May 1713 – 31 Jul 1723)
- Thomas Angelus Passante, Sch. P. (29 Jan 1725 – Nov 1732)
- Niccolò de Rosa (2 Dec 1733 – Jan 1774 Died)
- Gerolamo Dandolfi (Landolfi) (29 May 1775 – 21 Nov 1789)

Sede vacante (1789–1792)

- Gaetano Maria Capece, C.R. (27 Feb 1792 – Jun 1794)

Sede vacante (1794–1797)

- Carlo Maria Rosini (18 Dec 1797 – 18 Feb 1836)
- Pietro Ignazio Marolda, C.SS.R. (19 May 1837 – 15 Mar 1842)
- Raffaele Purpo (3 Apr 1843 – 23 Dec 1876)
- Gennaro de Vivo (23 Dec 1876 – 15 Feb 1893)
- Michele Zezza di Zapponeta (12 Jun 1893 –1919)
- Giuseppe Petrone (23 Sep 1921 – 23 Mar 1933)
- Alfonso Castaldo (27 Mar 1934 –1950)

Sede vacante (1950–1958)

Alfonso Castaldo, Administrator

- Alfonso Castaldo (1958–1966)

Sede vacante (1966–1974)

- Salvatore Sorrentino (21 Feb 1974 – 8 May 1993 Retired)
- Silvio Padoin (8 May 1993 – 2 Sep 2005 Retired)
- Gennaro Pascarella (2 September 2005 – present)

== Books ==
=== Reference works ===
- Gams, Pius Bonifatius (1873). Series episcoporum Ecclesiae catholicae: quotquot innotuerunt a beato Petro apostolo. Ratisbon: Typis et Sumptibus Georgii Josephi Manz. p. 914-915. (Use with caution; obsolete)
- Eubel, Conradus, ed. (1913). Hierarchia catholica (in Latin). Vol. Tomus 1 (second ed.). Münster: Libreria Regensbergiana. (in Latin)
- Eubel, Conradus, ed. (1914). Hierarchia catholica (in Latin). Vol. Tomus 2 (second ed.). Münster: Libreria Regensbergiana.
- Gulik, Guilelmus (1923). Eubel, Conradus (ed.). Hierarchia catholica (in Latin). Vol. Tomus 3 (second ed.). Münster: Libreria Regensbergiana.
- Gauchat, Patritius (Patrice) (1935). Hierarchia catholica. Vol. Tomus IV (1592-1667). Münster: Libraria Regensbergiana.
- Ritzler, Remigius; Sefrin, Pirminus (1952). Hierarchia catholica medii et recentis aevi. Vol. Tomus V (1667-1730). Patavii: Messagero di S. Antonio.
- Ritzler, Remigius; Sefrin, Pirminus (1958). Hierarchia catholica medii et recentis aevi. Vol. Tomus VI (1730-1799). Patavii: Messagero di S. Antonio.
- Ritzler, Remigius; Sefrin, Pirminus (1968). Hierarchia Catholica medii et recentioris aevi (in Latin). Vol. VII (1800–1846). Monasterii: Libreria Regensburgiana.
- Remigius Ritzler; Pirminus Sefrin (1978). Hierarchia catholica Medii et recentioris aevi (in Latin). Vol. VIII (1846–1903). Il Messaggero di S. Antonio.
- Pięta, Zenon (2002). Hierarchia catholica medii et recentioris aevi (in Latin). Vol. IX (1903–1922). Padua: Messagero di San Antonio. ISBN 978-88-250-1000-8.

=== Studies ===
- Ambrasi, Domenico; D'Ambrosio, Angelo (1990). La diocesi e i vescovi di Pozzuoli: "ecclesia sancti proculi puteolani episcopatus" (in Italian). Pozzuoli: Ufficio Pastorale Diocesano.
- Cappelletti, Giuseppe (1864). Le chiese d'Italia: dalla loro origine sino ai nostri giorni : opera (in Italian). Vol. decimonono (19). Venice: G. Antonelli. pp. 635–671.
- Kehr, Paul Fridolin (1925). Italia pontificia Vol. VIII (Berlin: Weidmann 1925), pp. 466–468. (in Latin)
- Lanzoni, Francesco (1927). Le diocesi d'Italia dalle origini al principio del secolo VII (an. 604). Faenza: F. Lega, pp. 211–213. (in Italian)
- Scherillo, Giovanni (1848), "Pozzuoli," in: Vincenzo D'Avino (1848). Cenni storici sulle chiese arcivescovili, vescovili, e prelatizie (nullius) del Regno delle Due Sicilie (in Italian). dalle stampe di Ranucci. pp. 549–556.
- Ughelli, Ferdinando; Coleti, Niccolo (1720). Italia sacra sive De episcopis Italiæ, et insularum adjacentium (in Latin). Vol. Tomus sextus (6). Venice: apud Sebastianum Coleti. pp. 267–290.
