= Vicegerent =

Representative and second-in-command to a head of state

Vicegerent is the official administrative deputy of a ruler or head of state: vice (Latin for 'in place of') and gerere (Latin for 'to carry on, conduct').

In Oxford colleges, a vicegerent is often someone appointed by the master of a college to assume their powers and responsibilities during a period of absence.

== Usage ==
=== Catholic Church ===
In the Catholic Church, the vicegerent is an auxiliary bishop of the Diocese of Rome, who is granted the personal title of archbishop and serves as the chief assistant to the Cardinal Vicar of Rome.

- 1701–1712: Domenico Zauli
- 1712–1715: Niccolò Caracciolo
- 1723–1738: Nunzio Baccari
- 1738–1742: Filippo Carlo Spada
- 1742–1759: Ferdinando Maria de' Rossi
- 1759–1773: Domenico Giordani
- 1774–1786: Francesco Antonio Marcucci
- 1787–1798: Francesco Saverio Passari
- 1800–1812: Benedetto Fenaja
- 1814–1821: Candido Maria Frattini
- 1821–1833: Giuseppe della Porta Rodiani
- 1833–1841: Antonio Luigi Piatti
- 1841–1842: Giuseppe Maria Vespignani
- 1842–1851: Giovanni Giuseppe Canali
- 1851–1862: Antonio Ligi Bussi
- 1862–1868: Pietro de Villanova Castellacci
- 1868–1876: Giuseppe Angelini
- 1876–1895: Giulio Lenti
- 1895–1899: Francesco di Paola Cassetta
- 1899–1917: Giuseppe Ceppetelli
- 1917–1936: Giuseppe Palica
- 1936–1960: Luigi Traglia
  - 1953–1960: Ettore Cunial, second vicegerent
- 1960–1972: Ettore Cunial
  - 1969–1972: Ugo Poletti, second vicegerent
- 1973–1975: Luigi Rovigatti
- 1975–1984: Giovanni Canestri
- 1985–1988: Ennio Appignanesi
- 1991–1996: Remigio Ragonesi
- 1996–2003: Cesare Nosiglia
- 2003–2010: Luigi Moretti
- 2012–2017: Filippo Iannone
- 2020–2022: Gianpiero Palmieri
- 2022–2024: Baldassare Reina
- 2024–present: Renato Tarantelli Baccari

=== Church of England ===
Early in 1535, closely following the passing of Parliament's Act of Supremacy formally creating the Church of England, King Henry VIII appointed his chief minister Thomas Cromwell "Vice-Gerent in spirituals", effectively acting as the king's deputy in church matters and taking precedence over the two archbishops; this was a necessary step as Cromwell, as an unordained layman, otherwise had no jurisdiction within the Church. The office was not continued after Cromwell's execution in 1540. Cromwell's earlier appointment, that of Vicar General, had different responsibilities: under this title he directed the royal commissions into monastic affairs.

=== Russian Empire ===
The term "vicegerency" (Ukrainian: намісництво, romanized: namisnytstvo; Russian: намесничество, romanized: namestnichestvo) is sometimes used in English-language historiography for an administrative division in the Russian Empire in the late 18th century. The administrators were called vicegerents, the equivalent of a governor-general. The following such divisions were established on the territory of modern Ukraine between 1780 and 1797:

- Kharkiv vicegerency in 1780;
- Kyiv vicegerency in 1781;
- Novhorod-Siverskyi vicegerency in 1781;
- Chernihiv vicegerency in 1781;
- Katerynoslav vicegerency in 1783;
- Iziaslav (Zaslav) vicegerency in 1793 (renamed Volhynia vicegerency in 1795);
- Bratslav vicegerency in 1793;
- Podilia vicegerency in 1793; and
- Voznesensk vicegerency in 1795.

In 1797, the vicegerencies were abolished and replaced by guberniyas, or governorates.

=== Southeast Asia ===
Patih or Pepatih is a regent title equivalent to vicegerent which was traditionally used among Austronesian polities of insular Southeast Asia, in particular those of Java and the Malay world. In the first place it denoted the chief minister of a kingdom or (in the case of Java) a traditional regency. Lesser ministers could also be known by the title. In some cases the headmen of local communities could be termed Patih, for example on 16th-century Java and in Banjarmasin in southeastern Kalimantan.

In his capacity of chief minister in a realm, the Patih was the right hand and representative of the ruler. The commands of the ruler were transferred to the regional or local chiefs via the Patih. In the Javanese kingdoms the Patih had his own palace, the Pepatihan, and carried a particular name; in Yogyakarta his name as regent was Danurejo, in Surakarta (Solo) it was Joyonegoro.

== Notable vicegerents ==
- King John became vicegerent under the Pope.
- Thomas Cromwell, Vicegerent of Henry VIII, appointed 1535.
- The Byzantine Emperors held as a title "God's Vicegerent on Earth".
- Milton, in his work Paradise Lost, titles the Son "The Vicegerent", in Book 10.
