= Pier Antonio Capobianco =

Italian Roman Catholic prelate

Most Reverend Pier Antonio Capobianco
- Bishop of Lacedonia
- Church: Catholic Church
- Diocese: Diocese of Lacedonia
- In office: 1663–1672
- Predecessor: Giacomo Giordano
- Successor: Benedetto Bartolo

Personal details
- Born: 26 January 1619 Naples, Italy
- Died: 30 October 1689 (age 70) Lacedonia, Italy

Pier Antonio Capobianco (26 January 1619 – 30 October 1689) was a Roman Catholic prelate who served as Bishop of Lacedonia from 1663 to 1672.

== Biography ==
Pier Antonio Capobianco was born in Naples, Italy, on 26 January 1619. On 12 March 1663, he was appointed during the papacy of Pope Alexander VII as Bishop of Lacedonia. He served as Bishop of Lacedonia until his resignation on 9 September 1672. He died on 30 October 1689.

== Episcopal succession ==
Episcopal succession of Pier Antonio Capobianco

While bishop, he was the principal co-consecrator of:

- Nicolò d'Arcano, Bishop of Comacchio (1671);
- Stefano Sculco, Bishop of Gerace (1671);
- Carlo Pellegrini, Bishop of Avellino e Frigento (1673);
- Domenico Sorrentino (bishop), Bishop of Ruvo (1673);
- Nikola Spanic, Bishop of Korčula (1673);
- Giovanni Battista Desio, Bishop of Venosa (1674);
- Raffaele Riario Di Saono, Bishop of Montepeloso (1674);
- Domenico Antonio Bernardini, Bishop of Castellaneta (1677);
- Giacomo Santoro, Bishop of Bitetto (1677);
- Niels Stensen, Titular Bishop of Titopolis (1677);
- Jakub Gorecki, Bishop of Bacău (1678);
- Andrea Massarenghi, Bishop of Massa Lubrense (1678);
- Marcantonio Barbarigo, Archbishop of Corfù (1678);
- Carlo Felice de Matta, Bishop of San Severo (1678);
- Francesco Scannagatta, Bishop of Avellino e Frigento (1679);
- Carlo Berlingeri, Archbishop of Santa Severina (1679);
- Francesco Megale, Bishop of Isola (1679);
- Giacomo Villani, Bishop of Caiazzo (1679);
- Giovanni Battista Nepita, Bishop of Sant'Angelo dei Lombardi e Bisaccia (1680);
- Tommaso Guzzoni, Bishop of Sora (1681);
- Andrea Brancaccio, Bishop of Conversano (1681);
- Pietro Pietra (Petria), Bishop of Colle di Val d'Elsa (1681);
- Stefano Ghirardelli, Bishop of Alatri (1683);
- Agostino Fieschi, Bishop of Accia and Mariana (1683);
- Giambattista Quaranta, Bishop of Larino (1683);
- Domenico Menna, Bishop of Minori (1683);
- Vincenzo Maria Durazzo, Bishop of Savona (1683);
- Ferdinando de Rojas (Roxas), Bishop of Vigevano (1683);
- Giambattista Rubini, Bishop of Vicenza (1684);
- Giovanni Battista De Pace, Bishop of Capaccio (1684);
- Giambattista Morea, Bishop of Lacedonia (1684);
- Pietro Luigi Malaspina, Bishop of Cortona (1684);
- Giovanni Riccanale, Bishop of Boiano (1684);
- Girolamo Compagnone, Archbishop of Rossano (1685);
- Angelo Cerasi, Bishop of Bovino (1685);
- Giovanni Battista Antici, Bishop of Amelia (1685);
- Pietro Valentini, Bishop of Sovana (1685);
- Emiddio Lenti, Bishop of Nocera de' Pagani (1685);
- Domenico Valvassori, Bishop of Gravina di Puglia (1686);
- François Genet, Bishop of Vaison (1686);
- Paolo Naldini (bishop), Bishop of Capodistria (1686);
- Baldassare de Benavente, Bishop of Potenza (1686);
- Filippo Massarenghi, Bishop of Bitonto (1686);
- Stefano Giuseppe Menatti, Titular Bishop of Cyrene (1686);
- Tommaso Caracciolo, Bishop of Gerace (1687);
- Domenico Maria Marchese, Bishop of Pozzuoli (1688);
- Pietro Antonio d'Alessandro, Bishop of San Marco (1688);
- Andrea de Rossi (archbishop), Archbishop of Rossano (1688);
- Baldassarre Nosadini, Bishop of Krk (1688);
- Alfonso de Aloysio, Bishop of Squillace (1688);
- Francesco Verde, Bishop of Vico Equense (1688);
- Giovanni Battista Costa, Bishop of Sagone (1688);
- Giorgio Emo, Archbishop of Corfù (1688);
- Giovanni Vusich, Bishop of Nona (1688); and
- Manuel de la Torre Gutiérrez, Archbishop of Lanciano (1688).

== See also ==
- Catholic Church in Italy

== External links and additional sources ==
- Cheney, David M. "Diocese of Lacedonia". Catholic-Hierarchy.org. (for Chronology of Bishops) ^{[self-published]}
- Chow, Gabriel. "Diocese of Lacedonia (Italy)". GCatholic.org. (for Chronology of Bishops) ^{[self-published]}

Catholic Church titles
Preceded by Giacomo Giordano	Bishop of Lacedonia; 1663–1672	Succeeded by Benedetto Bartolo
