= Porcari (surname) =

Porcari is a surname. Notable people with the surname include:

- Filippo Porcari (born 1984), Italian footballer
- Giovanni dei Porcari (died 1486), Roman Catholic prelate
- John Porcari (born 1958), American government official
- Matías Porcari (born 1986), Argentine football midfielder
- Stefano Porcari (early 15th century–1453), Italian politician and humanist

== See also ==
- Porcaro, town in Italy
- Porcaro (surname)
