= Bisaccia =

- Comune
- Comune di Bisaccia
- Location within Italy Location within Campania
- Coordinates: 41°0′47″N 15°22′32″E
- Country: Italy
- Region: Campania
- Province: Province of Avellino (AV)
- Frazioni: Calaggio, Macchitella, Oscata, Pastina, Pedurza, Piani San Pietro, Tuoro

Area
  - Total: 101.41 km^{2} (39.15 sq mi)
- Elevation: 860 m (2,820 ft)

Population (2005)
  - Total: 4,148
  - Density: 40.90/km^{2} (105.9/sq mi)
- Demonym: Bisaccesi
- Time zone: UTC+1 (CET)
  - Summer (DST): UTC+2 (CEST)
- Postal code: 83044
- Dialing code: 0827
- ISTAT code: 064011
- Patron saint: Sant'Antonio di Padova
- Saint day: 13 June
- Website: Official website

Bisaccia is an Italian town and comune, population 4,382, situated in the province of Avellino. It borders the communes of Andretta, Aquilonia, Calitri, Guardia Lombardi, Lacedonia, Scampitella and Vallata.

Bisaccia has its own Bisaccese dialect.

== History ==
=== Ancient Era ===
The area where Bisaccia now stands has been inhabited since the Bronze Age. Recent archaeological excavations on the hill of the old cemetery uncovered traces of huts dating back to the Middle Bronze Age (around 1400 BCE). These were later overlain by houses from the Archaic period (6th–5th century BCE), which were in turn covered by settlements from the 4th century BCE.

In the 9th century BCE, the Oliveto-Cairano culture — originally from the Adriatic coast and having reached Apulia via the Ofanto River — founded villages in Cairano and Bisaccia. In both Bisaccia and nearby Lacedonia, these new settlers replaced earlier Bronze Age inhabitants. In Bisaccia, they established a necropolis (9th–8th century BCE) with Iron Age pit graves.

During the pre-Roman era, the area was inhabited by the Samnite tribe of the Hirpini. However, the once-held theory that the Samnite city of Romulea was located in Bisaccia is now considered unlikely by modern scholars. In the 1st century CE, under Emperor Augustus, the Hirpini territory was separated from Samnium and incorporated into Regio II Apulia et Calabria. In the later Roman Empire, several Hirpinian towns were instead included in the province of Campania. Archaeological evidence in the area includes remains of rural Roman villas, but no direct records of Bisaccia exist before the arrival of the Lombards.

=== Medieval Era ===
In 591, the Lombards conquered Hirpini, and the territory of Bisaccia became part of the gastald of Conza, within the Duchy of Benevento. The Lombards ruled Bisaccia until the arrival of the Normans, who, under the leadership of Robert Guiscard (known as "the cunning"), subdued the entire gastald of Conza between 1076 and 1079.

During the Norman period, Bisaccia became a feudal holding. According to the Catalogus Baronum, the feudal lord of Bisaccia was obliged, in times of peace, to supply six mounted soldiers and twelve servants; in times of war, this number doubled to twelve cavalrymen and twenty-four servants. Given that each soldier cost 20 ounces of gold, the minimum annual income of the Bisaccia fief in the 12th century can be estimated at 60 ounces of gold, with the maximum being twice that amount. It was during this period that the first written records mentioning the village of Bisaccia appeared. As for the origin of the name "Bisaccia", several theories have been proposed: some scholars suggest it comes from the Latin bis facta ("made twice"); others from vis ("strength") and acies ("troop"); and still others from castrum Byzacii.

In 1246, Riccardo of Bisaccia, lord of the town, was stripped of his fief by Emperor Frederick II for having taken part in the Capaccio conspiracy. Frederick II later restored the castle of Bisaccia, using it as a prison and visiting the town himself in 1250. According to local tradition, the emperor also used the castle as a hunting residence. Nearby was the Formicoso hill, which Frederick renamed Monte Sano, where he is believed to have practiced falconry. The castle may also have occasionally hosted members of the Sicilian School of poetry.

Later, Manfred (Frederick’s son) granted the fief to the Count of Acerra. In 1254, Bisaccia’s castle became a refuge for Manfred himself while fleeing from papal forces. After Manfred’s death at the Battle of Benevento in 1266, the fief and its castle were returned to Riccardo II, grandfather of the Riccardo who had originally conspired against Frederick. Bisaccia subsequently passed to the Cotignì family. The local universitas (municipality) was administered by a governor, appointed annually by the town’s baron, who oversaw justice and civic matters.

During the Middle Ages, Bisaccia was also the seat of a bishopric for four centuries, until 1513, when Pope Leo X ordered its merger with the Archdiocese of Sant’Angelo dei Lombardi. The union became effective only in 1540, upon the death of Bisaccia’s last bishop.

=== Modern and Contemporary Era ===
In the 15th century, Bisaccia became a possession of the Del Balzo family. Count Pirro del Balzo was responsible for refounding and expanding the town, including major renovations to the castle.

From the 16th century until 1861, Bisaccia was part of the Kingdom of Naples (which became the Kingdom of the Two Sicilies in 1815), and from 1501 to 1707, it was under Spanish rule. Among its feudal lords were Giovanni Battista Manso — friend and host of the poet Torquato Tasso — and Ascanio Pignatelli, a duke and poet. Over the centuries, Bisaccia welcomed notable literary figures, including Torquato Tasso (in 1588) and Francesco De Sanctis.

In 1600, King Philip II of Spain elevated Bisaccia to a duchy in recognition of the services rendered to the crown by Ascanio Pignatelli — the first Duke of Bisaccia — and his father Scipione, Marquis of Lauro. In the early 18th century, during the War of the Spanish Succession, Spanish rule in Italy came under threat. In 1707, despite support from the Duke of Bisaccia, the Spanish viceroy Ascalona was defeated by Austrian forces. The Austrians took control of the Duchy of Naples and imprisoned the Duke of Bisaccia, the viceroy, and other nobles.

Between 1731 and 1739, Austria became involved in the War of the Polish Succession, during which it lost the Kingdom of Naples and Sicily, which were taken over by the Bourbon dynasty. With the end of Austrian rule, Bisaccia was incorporated into the Principato Ultra of the Kingdom of Naples. From 1743 to 1746, its territory came under the jurisdiction of the Royal Trade Consulate of Ariano.

In 1805, French Emperor Napoleon Bonaparte occupied the Kingdom of Naples, ending the Bourbon dynasty. He appointed his brother Joseph as King of Naples. Under foreign administration, feudalism was abolished. On 12 January 1807, Bisaccia was transferred from the province of Capitanata to that of Principato Ulteriore, which would later become the modern province of Avellino.

On 8 March 1809, the eighth Duke of Bisaccia, Giovanni Armando Pignatelli, died without an heir. As a result, the fief and the ducal title reverted to the royal court.

Since 1861, Bisaccia has been part of the Kingdom of Italy. The noble title and the castle were transferred to the French family de La Rochefoucauld-Doudeauville in 1851. The 11th Duke of Bisaccia, Édouard François Marie de La Rochefoucauld (1874 – 1968), sold the castle in 1956.

After the 1930 Irpinia earthquake, a new town was built near the historic centre. Like other remote towns, Bisaccia offers houses for 1 euro on the condition that the buyers restore the houses.

Following the 1980 Irpinia earthquake, the municipality received state funding amounting to approximately 250 billion lire. With these funds, a new section of Bisaccia was built, known as the Piano Regolatore, which is now home to the majority of the town’s population. Meanwhile, the historic center has been largely abandoned, due in part to the earthquake and to emigration to other parts of Italy and abroad (such as northern Italy, Germany, Switzerland, US, and Canada).

== Ecclesiastical History ==
It was a bishopric from before 1100. In 1540, the Diocese of Bisaccia was suppressed and its territory merged into the Roman Catholic Diocese of Sant’Angelo dei Lombardi–Bisaccia, which became the present Roman Catholic Archdiocese of Sant’Angelo dei Lombardi–Conza–Nusco–Bisaccia.

== Notable people ==
- Mario Procaccino, lawyer, comptroller, and candidate for Mayor of New York City.
- Emmanuel Fratianni, Famous Conductor, Composer and Pianist

Famous writers as Torquato Tasso and Francesco de Sanctis visited Bisaccia.

== See also ==
- Polisportiva Bisaccese: a football club based in the town.

== Sources and external links ==
- GigaCatholic
