= Stefano Sculco =

Most Reverend Stefano Sculco
- Bishop Emeritus of Gerace
- Church: Catholic Church
- Diocese: Diocese of Gerace
- In office: 1670–1686
- Predecessor: Michele Angelo Vincentini
- Successor: Tommaso Caracciolo

Orders
- Consecration: 4 January 1671 by Marcello Santacroce

Personal details
- Born: 1638 Papanice, Crotone, Italy
- Died: 9 November 1703 (age 65) Rome, Italy

Stefano Sculco (1638 – 9 November 1703) was a Roman Catholic prelate who served as Bishop of Gerace (1670–1686).

== Biography ==
Stefano Sculco was born in Papanice, Crotone, Italy in 1638. On 22 December 1670, he was appointed during the papacy of Pope Clement X as Bishop of Gerace. On 4 January 1671, he was consecrated bishop by Marcello Santacroce, Bishop of Tivoli, Pier Antonio Capobianco, Bishop Emeritus of Lacedonia, and Andrea Tamantini, Bishop of Cagli, serving as co-consecrators. He served as Bishop of Gerace till 20 April 1686. He died in 1703.

== External links and additional sources ==
- Cheney, David M. "Diocese of Locri-Gerace (-Santa Maria di Polsi)". Catholic-Hierarchy.org. (for Chronology of Bishops) ^{[self-published]}
- Chow, Gabriel. "Diocese of Locri–Gerace (Italy)". GCatholic.org. (for Chronology of Bishops) ^{[self-published]}

Catholic Church titles
| Preceded by Michele Angelo Vincentini | Bishop of Gerace; 1670–1686 | Succeeded by Tommaso Caracciolo |
