= Vertexguy =

American artist/musician

Chris Kline
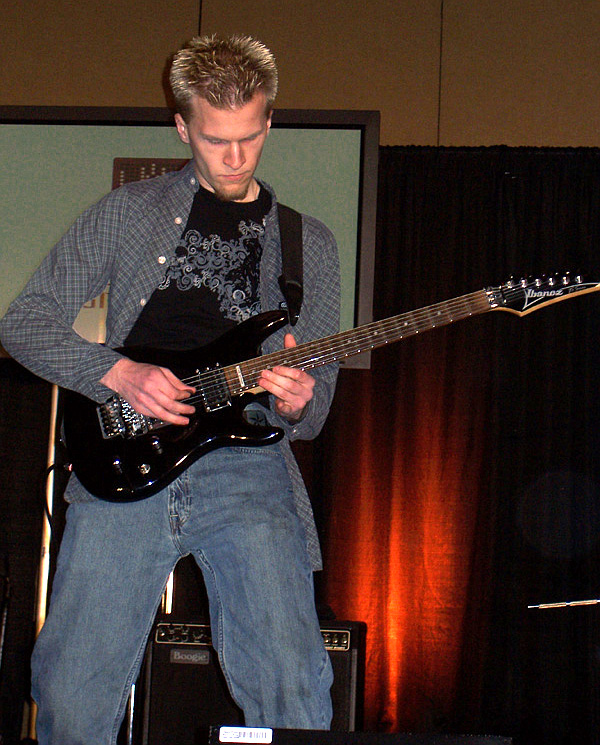
- Kline in 2007

Background information
- Also known as: Vertexguy, Vertex Guy, the Vertex Guy, Vertex, Vert
- Genres: Video game music, Rock, heavy metal, Progressive rock
- Occupation: Creative Director – The Regis Company
- Instrument: Guitar
- Website: www.vertexguy.com

Chris Kline is an American artist/musician best known as "Vertexguy" or the "Vertex Guy". His artwork and music is present in several video games spanning more than a dozen titles across several console and PC platforms. His guitar renditions of classic video game songs have also been performed live at award shows and in concert with Video Games Live.

== Biography ==
Chris Kline's musical influences started from his parents, David and Mary Ellen Kline, who first met in a rock and roll band. David Kline was a drummer and encouraged his son to pick up the drums around the age of 5. Kline stuck with the drums through high school, but also tried out a few other instruments along the way, such as the violin and the guitar. In middle school, Kline joined band and quickly excelled to first chair drummer. He performed in competition Jazz band and performed drum solos at band concerts in front of the entire school.

Around this time, Kline also became interested in learning the guitar. He started out on his father's old acoustic guitar trying to play songs like "Enter Sandman" and "The Unforgiven" made popular by Metallica. Soon after this, he got his first electric guitar. Kline was largely influenced by heavy metal, rock and progressive rock bands of the 1980s and had a hard time finding any instructors interested in the same genres. He started by taking a few lessons here and there, but ended up quitting and teaching himself along the way. During this time, he developed his musical ear to a very high level enabling him to pick up new songs very quickly.

Around this time, he also was heavily influenced by the video game industry and took a strong liking to the Nintendo Entertainment System. He had a passion for art and music and had been conjuring up his own game designs since the NES made its first United States debut in 1985. With the help of AOL, he went online and began searching for other like-minded individuals wanting to try to make their own video game. In the process, he formed the company known as "Nuke Ware". He pursued a few different game designs under this company, and with the help of DarkSoft Entertainment, successfully co-published his first title, Empires: Quest for Power on the Excalibur BBS.

Not long after this, Kline graduated from Yankton High School and went off to college. He applied and was accepted into the Art Institute of Phoenix. He began pursuing the nation's first Bachelor of Arts in Game Art & Design. In college, Kline excelled in all subjects and made the Deans Honor Roll.

During his early college years, Kline joined his first official band, "Universal Tongue". Kline toured the local bar scenes with them performing lead / rhythm guitar on original and popular cover songs. Kline's involvement with the band lasted about a year. Shortly after Kline left, the band began falling apart and is now non existent.

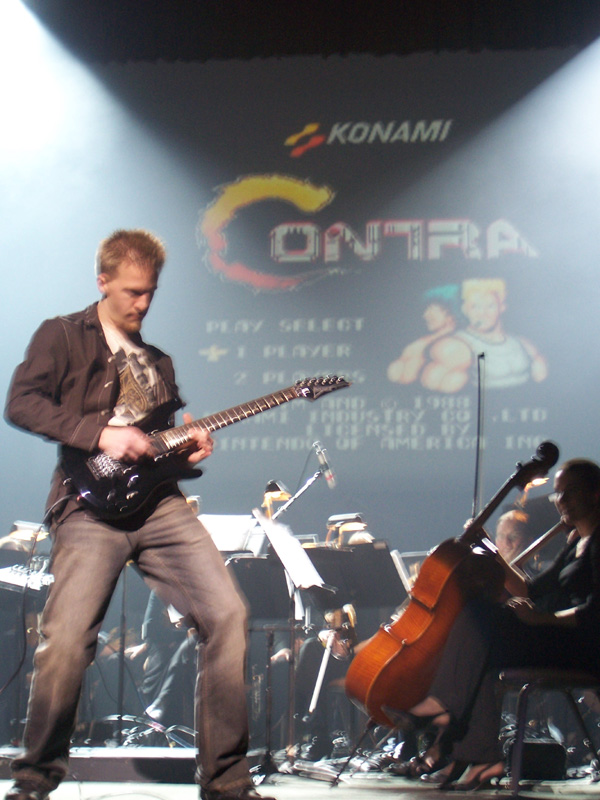
Chris Kline performing Contra: Jungle Jam at Video Games Live, Game Developers Conference 2007.

Towards the final year of college, Kline realized he would need to create a website for his online portfolio. He wanted the address to be memorable and make sense with the type of work he did. Since 3D art is made up of vertices at its core level, and this is what he spends his time manipulating every day, Kline thought it would be catchy to call himself "VertexGuy". Kline usually lumps the two words together to match his website address (www.vertexguy.com), but can often be found referenced as "the vertex guy", "vertex guy", "vertex" or "vert". He prefers treating the title as one word because it is unique enough to make him instantly easy to find in any search engine.

After graduating from college in 2002, Kline moved to Prescott, Arizona to be with his girlfriend, Trina Noelle Cowin, who would soon become his wife. During this time, Kline worked on his art portfolio and began applying to game studios across the United States. Knowing he needed a job to get married, Kline jumped on the first major opportunity that came his way. This came in the form of a job offer from FarSight Studios.

During his time at FarSight Studios, Kline quickly adapted and assumed a natural leadership role, taking on a great deal of responsibility. In addition to creating artwork for all the games the studio worked on, he also became the studio's Audio Director. He created all the sound effects for the studio's game line up and also wrote a few music scores.

In 2005, Kline joined www.MusicianWar.com and began posting original compositions in friendly music competition. This site features categories to compete in and the one that caught Kline's attention the most was "Video Game Themes". Though this did not seem to be a very popular category, Kline began posting guitar renditions of various classic video game themes. Shortly after, he decided to take one of the game themes he covered (John Petrucci’s Necronomicon: Epiloque) and post it on YouTube. Not long after, he followed it up with his remake of the original level 1 music from the NES title, Contra. This release proved to be a huge hit and spawned much media attention from various gaming sites. Since then, he has been interviewed and discussed on several major gaming sites, including Kotaku and Destructoid.

On June 28, 2006, Kline's rendition of the Duke Nukem theme, titled "Duke Nukem Jam", was presented on 3D Realms' front page (www.3dRealms.com). This helped expose Kline to new listeners, who immediately became die hard fans of his work. Since then, his video on YouTube has had more than a million views, in addition to millions of total views spanning across all his videos. Chris was later contracted by 3D Realms and Apogee for use of his Duke Nukem Jam in their promotional trailer videos created for Duke Nukem 3d on Xbox Live and the Duke Nukem Trilogy trailer for PSP.

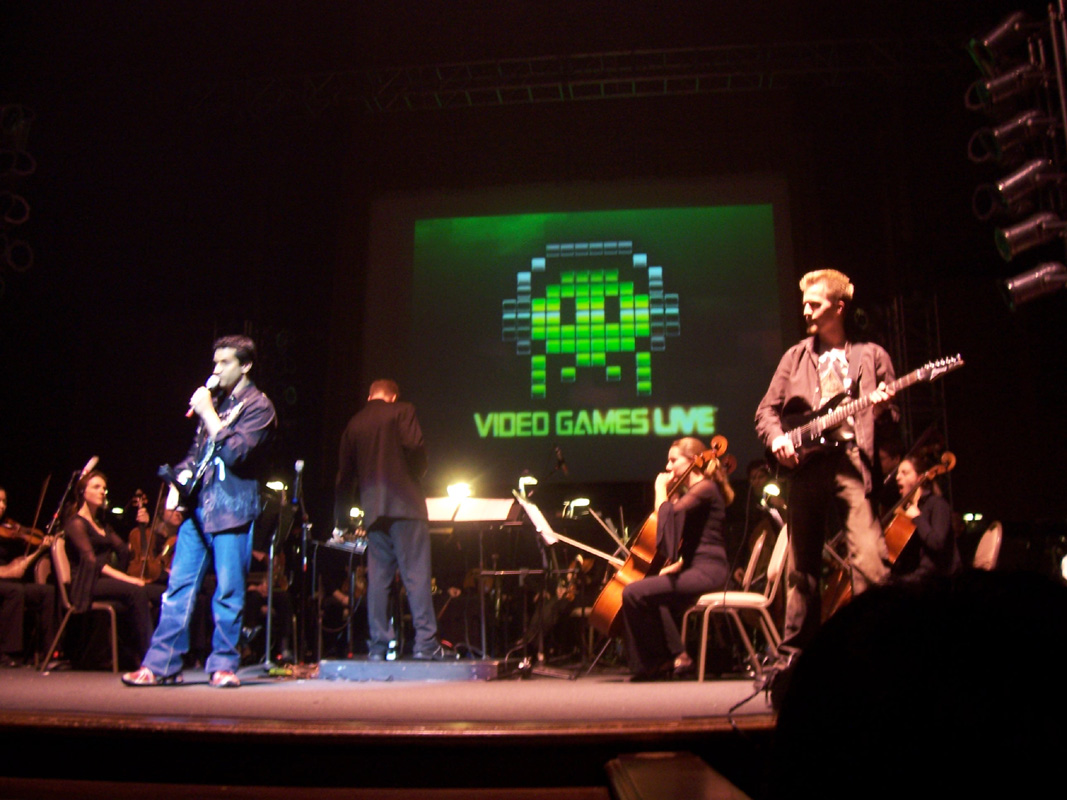
Tommy Tallarico introducing Chris Kline at Video Games Live, Game Developers Conference 2007.

After Contra made its popular debut across the web, a fellow MySpace user named "Stretch" contacted Kline and suggested that he contact Tommy Tallarico and Jack Wall from Video Games Live to see if they might be interested in doing something together. Kline took him up on this advice and soon after was invited to perform with Video Games Live at the Game Developers Conference in 2007. He also performed at the Game Audio Network Guild (G.A.N.G.) Awards show during the conference. Since then, Kline has performed with Video Games Live at the E4All Expo in 2007, and in Loveland, CO in 2009.

== Games contributed to ==
- PAIN (PS3, PSN)
- Madagascar: Escape 2 Africa (PS2, PS3, Xbox 360, Wii)
- Bionic Commando: (PS3, Xbox 360, Windows)
- Backyard Baseball 2009: (PS2, Windows, Wii)
- Game Party: (Wii)
- Backyard Football 2008: (PS2, Windows, Wii)
- The Williams Collection (PS2, PSP, Wii)
- Scarface: Money, Power, Respect: (PSP)
- Hard Rock Casino: (PS2, PSP)
- Skateboarder: (stand alone game console unit)
- Gottlieb's Pinball Classics: (PSP)
- Golden Tee Home Edition: (stand alone game console unit)
- Real Swing Golf: (stand alone game console unit)
- Pinball Hall of Fame: The Gottlieb Collection: (PS2, Xbox, GameCube)
- Empires: Quest for Power (Excalibur BBS)

== Music Discography ==
- Video Games Live – Level 3
- Video Games Live – Level 2 (received IGN's Editors Choice Honor for 2010 and made the top 10 billboard charts)
- Video Games Live – Volume 1 (received IGN's Best Videogame Soundtrack Award for 2008 and made the top 10 billboard charts)
- Pinball Hall of Fame - The Gottlieb Collection
- Pinball Hall of Fame - The Williams Collection
- Bionic Jam (2008)

== Video Games Live ==
Kline has been involved in the creation of several productions with Video Games Live.

- Guitar Hero: Foo Fighters – The Pretender May 23, 2011 Created the Rhythm Guitar parts.
- Portal: Still Alive September 28, 2010 Created the Rhythm / Lead Guitar parts.
- Street Fighter II Medley September 24, 2010 Created the Rhythm / Lead Guitar, Bass Guitar, and Drum Kit parts.
- Guitar Hero: Aerosmith – Sweet Emotion March 25, 2010 Created the Rhythm / Lead Guitar parts.
- Guitar Hero: Van Halen – Jump March 6, 2010 Created the Rhythm / Lead Guitar parts.
- Silent Hill 2: Theme of Laura September 10, 2009 Created the Rhythm / Lead Guitar, Bass Guitar, and Drum Kit parts.
- Halo Suite January 16, 2008 Created the Rhythm / Lead Guitar parts.
- Sonic The Hedgehog – Green Hill Zone Zone December 3, 2007 Created the Rhythm / Lead Guitar parts.
- Tron December 3, 2007 Created the Rhythm / Lead Guitar parts.
- Outrun December 3, 2007 Created the Rhythm / Lead Guitar parts.
- Super Mario Bros. December 3, 2007 Created the Rhythm / Lead Guitar parts.
- Valve Theme December 3, 2007 Created the Rhythm / Lead Guitar parts.
- Halo 3 – Finish the Fight December 3, 2007 Created the Rhythm / Lead Guitar parts.
- Classic Arcade Medley December 3, 2007 Created the Rhythm / Lead Guitar parts.
- Final Fantasy VII – One Winged Angel February 23, 2007 Created the Rhythm / Lead Guitar, Bass Guitar, and Drum Kit parts.
