= Giambattista Morea =

Italian Roman Catholic prelate

Most Reverend Giambattista Morea
- Bishop of Lacedonia
- Church: Catholic Church
- Diocese: Diocese of Lacedonia
- In office: 1684–1711
- Predecessor: Benedetto Bartolo
- Successor: Gennaro Scalea

Orders
- Consecration: 8 October 1684 by Alessandro Crescenzi (cardinal)

Personal details
- Born: 22 September 1640 Bitonto, Italy
- Died: 11 December 1711 (age 71) Lacedonia, Italy

Giambattista Morea (22 September 1640 – 11 December 1711) was a Roman Catholic prelate who served as Bishop of Lacedonia (1684–1711).

== Biography ==
Giambattista Morea was born in Bitonto, Italy on 22 September 1640. On 2 October 1684, he was appointed during the papacy of Pope Innocent XI as Bishop of Lacedonia. On 8 October 1684, he was consecrated bishop by Alessandro Crescenzi (cardinal), Cardinal-Priest of Santa Prisca, with Pier Antonio Capobianco, Bishop Emeritus of Lacedonia, and Benedetto Bartolo, Bishop of Belcastro, serving as co-consecrators. He served as Bishop of Lacedonia until his death on 11 December 1711.

== External links and additional sources ==
- Cheney, David M. "Diocese of Lacedonia". Catholic-Hierarchy.org. (for Chronology of Bishops) ^{[self-published]}
- Chow, Gabriel. "Diocese of Lacedonia (Italy)". GCatholic.org. (for Chronology of Bishops) ^{[self-published]}

Catholic Church titles
Preceded by Benedetto Bartolo	Bishop of Lacedonia; 1684–1711	Succeeded by Gennaro Scalea
