= Gian Paolo Palenteri =

Italian Roman Catholic prelate

Most Reverend Gian Paolo Palenteri
- Bishop of Lacedonia
- Church: Catholic Church
- Diocese: Diocese of Lacedonia
- In office: 1602–1606
- Predecessor: Marco Pedacca
- Successor: Giacomo Candido (bishop)

Personal details
- Died: 1606 Lacedonia, Italy

Gian Paolo Palenteri, O.F.M. Conv. (died 1606) was a Roman Catholic prelate who served as Bishop of Lacedonia (1602–1606).

== Biography ==
Gian Paolo Palenteri was ordained a priest in the Order of Friars Minor Conventual. On 27 November 1602, he was appointed during the papacy of Pope Clement VIII as Bishop of Lacedonia. He served as Bishop of Lacedonia until his death in 1606.

== External links and additional sources ==
- Cheney, David M. "Diocese of Lacedonia". Catholic-Hierarchy.org. (for Chronology of Bishops) ^{[self-published]}
- Chow, Gabriel. "Diocese of Lacedonia (Italy)". GCatholic.org. (for Chronology of Bishops) ^{[self-published]}

Catholic Church titles
Preceded by Marco Pedacca	Bishop of Lacedonia; 1602–1606	Succeeded by Giacomo Candido (bishop)
