= Diocese of Bisaccia =

The Diocese of Bisaccia (Latin: Dioecesis Bisaciensis) in the town of Bisaccia in the province of Avellino, in southern Italy. In 1517, it was united with the Diocese of Sant'Angelo dei Lombardi.

== Ordinaries ==
(all Roman Rite; probably incomplete)

=== Diocese of Bisaccia ===
Erected: 12th Century

- Basilio (1097? – ?)
- Riccardo (1179? – ?)
- Lodato (1254.09.30 – ?)
- Zaccaria (1265 – death 1282)
- Benedetto (1282 – 1288.04.20), later Bishop of Avellino (Italy) (1288.04.20 – death 1294)
- Giacomo (1311.05.19 – death 1328), previously Bishop of La Canea (Greece; ? – 1311.05.19)
- Bestagno, Dominican Order O.P. (1329.09.11 – 1351)
- Nicola, O.P. (1351.06.27 – ?)
- Benedetto Colonna (1353 – ?)
- Giovanni (? – 1364.07.23), later Bishop of Terralba (Italy) (1364.07.23 – 1389)
- Costantino da Termoli, Augustinians (O.E.S.A.) (1365.03.26 – 1368.11.03), later Bishop of Montecorvino (1368.11.03 – ?)
- Stefano (1368 – 1369)
- Francesco de Capite, Friars Minor (O.F.M.) (1369.02.21 – ?)
- Nicola (1386.06.09 – ?)
- Leone (1389.08.21 – ?)
- Giovanni Angeli (1410.06.13 – )
- Guglielmo Nicolai (1428.11.03 – ?)
- Petruccio de Migliolo (1450.06.12 – 1463.01.30), later Bishop of Lacedonia (Italy) (1463.01.30 – death 1481)
- Martino Madio da Tramonti (Madio da Tramonti) (1463.04.08 – 1487.08.24), later Bishop of Bisceglie (Italy) (1487.08.24 – 1507)
- Bernardino Barbiani (1487.08.24 – ?), previously Bishop of Bisceglie (Italy) (1476.08.09 – 1487.08.24)
- Gaspare de Corbara (1498.11.12 – 1517.12.23)
- Nicola Volpe (1517.12.23 – death 1540)

23 December 1517: United with the Diocese of Sant'Angelo dei Lombardi to form the Diocese of Sant'Angelo dei Lombardi e Bisaccia

== See also ==
- Catholic Church in Italy
