= Marco Pedacca =

Italian roman-catholic bishop

Most Reverend Marco Pedacca
- Bishop of Lacedonia
- Church: Catholic Church
- Diocese: Diocese of Lacedonia
- In office: 1584–1602
- Predecessor: Gianfranco Carducci
- Successor: Gian Paolo Palenteri

Orders
- Consecration: 6 May 1584 by Thomas Goldwell

Personal details
- Died: 27 January 1602 Lacedonia, Italy

Marco Pedacca, O.S.B. (died 27 January 1602) was a Roman Catholic prelate who served as Bishop of Lacedonia (1584–1602).

== Biography ==
Marco Pedacca was ordained a priest in the Order of Saint Benedict. On 14 March 1584, he was appointed during the papacy of Pope Gregory XIII as Bishop of Lacedonia. On 6 May 1584, he was consecrated bishop by Thomas Goldwell, Bishop of Saint Asaph, with Giovanni Battista Santorio, Bishop of Alife, and Ignazio Danti (bishop), Bishop of Alatri, serving as co-consecrators. He served as Bishop of Lacedonia until his death on 27 January 1602.

== External links and additional sources ==
- Cheney, David M. "Diocese of Lacedonia". Catholic-Hierarchy.org. (for Chronology of Bishops) ^{[self-published]}
- Chow, Gabriel. "Diocese of Lacedonia (Italy)". GCatholic.org. (for Chronology of Bishops) ^{[self-published]}

Catholic Church titles
| Preceded by Gianfranco Carducci | Bishop of Lacedonia; 1584–1602 | Succeeded by Gian Paolo Palenteri |
