= Giacomo Porfida =

Roman Catholic prelate

Most Reverend Giacomo Porfida
- Bishop of Ariano
- Church: Catholic Church
- Diocese: Diocese of Ariano
- In office: 1463–1480
- Successor: Nicola Ippoliti
- Previous post: Bishop of Lacedonia (1452–1463)

Personal details
- Died: 1480 Ariano, Kingdom of Naples

Giacomo Porfida or Giacomo Purfida (died 1480) was a Roman Catholic prelate who served as Bishop of Ariano (1463–1480) and Bishop of Lacedonia (1452–1463).

== Biography ==
On 11 August 1452, Giacomo Porfida was appointed during the papacy of Pope Nicholas V as Bishop of Lacedonia. On 8 April 1463, he was appointed by Pope Pius II as Bishop of Ariano. He served as Bishop of Ariano until his death in 1480.

== External links and additional sources ==
- Cheney, David M. "Diocese of Ariano Irpino-Lacedonia". Catholic-Hierarchy.org. (for Chronology of Bishops) ^{[self-published]}
- Chow, Gabriel. "Diocese of Ariano Irpino–Lacedonia". GCatholic.org. (for Chronology of Bishops) ^{[self-published]}

Catholic Church titles
Preceded by Joannes	Bishop of Lacedonia; 1452–1463	Succeeded by Petruccio de Migliolo
Preceded by	Bishop of Ariano; 1463–1480	Succeeded by Nicola Ippoliti
