= Niccolò de Rubini =

Italian Roman Catholic bishop (died 1505)

Most Reverend Niccolò de Rubini
- Bishop of Lacedonia
- Church: Catholic Church
- Diocese: Diocese of Lacedonia
- In office: 1486–1505
- Predecessor: Giovanni dei Porcari
- Successor: Antonio Dura

Personal details
- Died: 8 August 1505 Lacedonia, Italy

Niccolò de Rubini (died 8 August 1505) was a Roman Catholic prelate who served as Bishop of Lacedonia (1486–1505).

On 2 June 1486, Niccolò de Rubini was appointed during the papacy of Pope Innocent VIII as Bishop of Lacedonia. He served as Bishop of Lacedonia until his death on 8 August 1505.

== External links and additional sources ==
- Cheney, David M. "Diocese of Lacedonia". Catholic-Hierarchy.org. (for Chronology of Bishops) ^{[self-published]}
- Chow, Gabriel. "Diocese of Lacedonia (Italy)". GCatholic.org. (for Chronology of Bishops) ^{[self-published]}

Catholic Church titles
Preceded by Giovanni dei Porcari	Bishop of Lacedonia; 1486–1505	Succeeded by Antonio Dura
