= Laurie Robinson =

- Origin: Arizona
- Genres: Film music, video game music
- Occupations: Singer, composer, music producer
- Instrument: Voice

Laurie Robinson is an American music producer, composer, and solo artist active in the film, television, video games industries as well as the concert world. She is creative director at the Collective Music & Media Group, a production company which is known for large music installations. She is also known for her compositions on the multi-award winning score of the video game Advent Rising with Tommy Tallarico and Emmanuel Fratianni.

== Early life ==
Laurie Robinson grew up in the Sonoran Desert, raised by her hobbyist musician mother and music-loving father. Her early influences include Bill Evans, Julie Andrews, Rodgers & Hammerstein, Stevie Wonder and Stan Getz. She graduated from University of Arizona in Music Composition cum laude, where she studied under neo-classical composer Robert Muczynski as well as pianist, pedagogue and Liszt scholar Ozan Marsh.

== Career ==
=== Concert works ===
Laurie Robinson's symphonic compositions and orchestrations for video game music, such as those for Advent Rising, Halo, have been performed internationally since 2005 as part of the Video Games Live concert series with a number of renowned orchestras, including the Los Angeles Philharmonic, San Francisco Symphony, National Symphony Orchestra at the Kennedy Center, Pittsburgh Symphony, The London Philharmonic, Hollywood Bowl Orchestra, and Taipei Philharmonic.

In 2013, Robinson was commissioned to compose "Portale, City of Angeles- Gateway to the World" nicknamed "Symphony in an Airport," to commemorate the grand opening of the new Tom Bradley International Terminal (TBIT) at Los Angeles International Airport (LAX) The commission represented a return of public and private philanthropy to the funding of new public works of art. The score was presented to Antonio Villaraigosa, retiring Mayor of Los Angeles by Westfield Group's Co-CEO Peter Lowy at the premier. The symphony premier was sponsored in part by Westfield Corporation, and facilitated by the Los Angeles Airport Authority (LAWA), City of Los Angeles Office of Tourism, Jupiter Ambrosia Productions and in small part by Ville de Lausanne and Canton de Vaud, Switzerland.

"Portale" was co-composed and also conducted by Maestro Emmanuel Fratianni at the premier. It was written as a concerto grosso featuring the Hollywood Scoring Orchestra and visiting international soloists including: Karen Han (erhu), Stefan Saccon (saxophone), choir and others. The music was specifically composed to highlight the acoustics of the iconic terminal design by Fentress Architects and the IEMS environmental media art of MRA International, Sardi Design, Moment Factory and Digital Kitchen. A dedication listed from a Westfield press release reads: "Meaning 'city gate', Portale attempts to take the listener through Los Angeles' journey, by highlighting the origin of its natural beauty and the Pacific Ocean and continuing on to tell the story of the city as a melting pot for 'citizens of the world,' whose ingenuity and innovation underscores the genius and creativity rooted in the city's people."

=== Film music ===
After graduating from University of Arizona, Robinson moved to Los Angeles and continued her training at UCLA and began work as a composer in the entertainment industry under the mentorship of Alf Clausen (The Simpsons) and Jay Chattaway (Star Trek). She composed incidental music and underscoring licensed for a number of TV shows and programs including Breaking Bad, NCIS, American Idol, Futurama, Dateline NBC, PBS' Out in America and American Masters television series and numerous commercials. She also worked in the film and record business for Paramount Pictures music library and Bill Hughes Music Services as a scoring proofreader for Whitney Houston, Julie Andrews and Billy Byers tours and albums and multiple Oscars telecasts. She was mentored by and became a frequent collaborator and arranger for Grammy-winning record producer Ted Perlman.

=== Video games ===
In 2005, Robinson was invited by Emmanuel Fratianni and Tommy Tallarico to compose the music for the video game Advent Rising. The score was widely praised and was the recipient of "Soundtrack of the Year" by Play magazine, a G.A.N.G. Award, as well as several G.A.N.G. and NAViGaTR nominations and released as a soundtrack album on Nile Rodgers' Sumthing Else Music Works record label. In 2008 the score was released by EMI classics on the compilation album Video Games Live, Vol. 1 and debuted at #8 on the Billboard Top-Ten classical crossover chart. In 2011 the London Philharmonic recorded the score as the title track on the album The Greatest Video Game Music, which debuted at #3 on the classical crossover chart, resulting in her second appearance in the top 10 as a composer.

As session singer and vocal track producer for video game scores, she recorded the vocals for the Advent Rising scores Muse and Poeta, a fan favorite often referred to as an "ethereal" and "ghostly soprano" among gaming music fans. She collaborated briefly with composers Cris Velasco and Sasha Dikiciyan as vocal artist on the Hellgate: London and Beowulf soundtracks in Los Angeles as well as the Paris Ubisoft studio. Her orchestration of Marty O'Donnell and Michael Salvatori's HALO theme is a fan favorite on multiple albums and the Video Games Live international concert tour.

=== Guest artist – vocalist ===
Beginning in her college days, Robinson worked as a session vocalist and voice contractor for local band recordings in Arizona. She continued that service when she relocated to Los Angeles for independent film soundtracks, commercials and video games. In 2004 while composing music for the game Advent Rising, her vocal tracks intended as a scratch vocals was retained by the producers and went on to the Video Games Live, Vol. 1 in 2008, which landed in the Billboard Top-Ten, beginning her career in the classical/crossover world as a soloist.

In 2005 Robinson made her Hollywood Bowl debut with the Los Angeles Philharmonic, for the inaugural Video Games Live concert with an audience of 11,000 people. She toured with Video Games Live as the featured soloist for the next three years. Her concerts included performing as a guest artist with National Symphony Orchestra at the Kennedy Center, the Houston Symphony, and others. In 2010 she was featured as a soloist in a PBS concert broadcast with the Louisiana Philharmonic entitled Video Games Live.

=== Other work ===
Robinson is also co-founder of the Southern California Piano Academy, a Los Angeles neighborhood music conservatory and pedagogical workshop dedicated to the study and development of music education for young people. Laurie's video game concert scores for school symphony, choir, wind ensemble and marching band, are published by Alfred Music Publishing in North America.

== Discography ==
| Year | Album | Work | Accolades |
|---|---|---|---|
| 2001 | Paradise (Kaci Battaglia) | string arranger | Platinum UK |
| 2005 | Advent Rising Soundtrack | composer | |
| 2008 | Video Games Live: Vol. 1 | soloist/composer/orchestrator | Billboard Top-10 Classical Crossover Album |
| 2010 | Video Games Live: Level 2 | soloist/composer/orchestrator | |
| 2011 | Play for Japan! | string arranger | |
| 2011 | The Greatest Video Game Music | composer | Billboard Top-10 Classical Crossover Album |
| 2012 | PLAY for JAPAN! Vol. 2 | composer | |
