= Gian Giacomo Cristoforo =

Roman Catholic prelate

Most Reverend Gian Giacomo Cristoforo
- Bishop of Lacedonia
- Church: Catholic Church
- Diocese: Diocese of Lacedonia
- In office: 1649
- Predecessor: Ferdinando Bruno
- Successor: Ambrosio Viola

Orders
- Consecration: 18 Apr 1649 by Pier Luigi Carafa

Personal details
- Born: 1588 Piaggine, Italy
- Died: 8 May 1649 (age 61) Lacedonia, Italy

Gian Giacomo Cristoforo (1588 – 8 May 1649) was a Roman Catholic prelate who served as Bishop of Lacedonia (1649).

== Biography ==
Gian Giacomo Cristoforo was born in Piaggine, Italy in 1588. On 12 April 1649, he was appointed during the papacy of Pope Innocent X as Bishop of Lacedonia. On 18 April 1649, he was consecrated bishop by Pier Luigi Carafa, Cardinal-Priest of Santi Silvestro e Martino ai Monti, with Ranuccio Scotti Douglas, Bishop of Borgo San Donnino, and Enea di Cesare Spennazzi, Bishop of Ferentino, serving as co-consecrators. He served as Bishop of Lacedonia until his death on 8 May 1649.

== External links and additional sources ==
- Cheney, David M. "Diocese of Lacedonia". Catholic-Hierarchy.org. (for Chronology of Bishops) ^{[self-published]}
- Chow, Gabriel. "Diocese of Lacedonia (Italy)". GCatholic.org. (for Chronology of Bishops) ^{[self-published]}

Catholic Church titles
Preceded by Ferdinando Bruno	Bishop of Lacedonia; 1649	Succeeded by Ambrosio Viola
