= Giacomo Candido (bishop) =

Most Reverend Giacomo Candido
- Bishop of Lacedonia
- Church: Catholic Church
- Diocese: Diocese of Lacedonia
- In office: 1606–1608
- Predecessor: Gian Paolo Palenteri
- Successor: Gian Gerolamo Campanili

Orders
- Consecration: 19 November 1606 by Fabio Blondus de Montealto

Personal details
- Died: August 1608 Lacedonia, Italy

Giacomo Candido (died August 1608) was a Roman Catholic prelate who served as Bishop of Lacedonia (1606–1608).

== Biography ==
Giacomo Candido was born in 1566. On 13 November 1606, he was appointed during the papacy of Pope Paul V as Bishop of Lacedonia. On 19 November 1606, he was consecrated bishop by Fabio Blondus de Montealto, Titular Patriarch of Jerusalem, with Metello Bichi, Bishop Emeritus of Sovana, and Angelo Rocca, Titular Bishop of Thagaste, serving as co-consecrators. He served as Bishop of Lacedonia until his death in August 1608.

Catholic Church titles
Preceded by Gian Paolo Palenteri	Bishop of Lacedonia; 1606–1608	Succeeded by Gian Gerolamo Campanili
