= Gamer Symphony Orchestra at the University of Maryland =

Musical ensemble devoted to performing video game music

- Orchestra
- Short name: GSO
- Founded: 2005
- Location: University of Maryland, College Park, Maryland
- Concert hall: Dekelboum Concert Hall at the Clarice Smith Performing Arts Center
- Website: umd.gamersymphony.org

The Gamer Symphony Orchestra at the University of Maryland (often referred to as the GSO, UMGSO, or UMDGSO) is a student-run symphony orchestra and chorus at the University of Maryland. The orchestra is the first collegiate ensemble to draw its repertoire exclusively from the music of video games. Most of GSO's members are non-music majors The orchestra holds a free concert every semester during the academic year and yearly charity fundraisers that benefit Children's National Hospital in Washington, D.C.

== History ==
Michelle Eng, a violist in the School of Music's Repertoire Orchestra, founded GSO in the fall of 2005. The group's first public performance was April 29, 2006, and featured about 20 musicians. The GSO added a choir in the fall of 2007, by which time the ensemble totaled 50 musicians. As of spring 2010 the orchestra had 100 members, including 30 choral singers. By fall of 2010, its numbers had surpassed 100, and as of spring 2013, membership is at 120. The orchestra continues to boast large membership consisting of 100+ members every semester.

The development of this orchestra mirrors the acceptance of classical music concerts anchored by video game music in the United States. Eng founded this group after having been inspired by Video Games Live, the Dear Friends concert series, and "Video Game Pianist" Martin Leung.

Composer Jonathan Coulton complimented the GSO's 2008 performance of "Still Alive," from the popular video game "Portal," calling it a "fantastic cover" in a post on his blog. This recording was posted to OC ReMix as only the second live recording in the history of the site—the first accepted ReMix of music from "Portal." OC ReMix founder David Lloyd was present for GSO's first live performance of "Still Alive."

The GSO's concert on December 11, 2010, overfilled the capacity of the 1,170-seat Dekelboum Concert Hall, the largest concert hall at the university's Clarice Smith Performing Arts Center.

The Video Games Live concert on February 26, 2011, at Strathmore in Bethesda, Md., featured "a special contribution" from the GSO. GSO and Video Games Live staff began discussing collaborative possibilities in August 2010 for the pair of Strathmore concerts. VGL founder Tommy Tallarico chose to include an adapted version of GSO's arrangement of "Korobeiniki" ("A-Type") from Tetris in the Strathmore concert programs. The National Philharmonic Orchestra and Chorale performed the piece, arranged by GSO Conductor Emeritus Greg Cox. Former GSO Music Director and current singer Chris Apple performed the piece's tenor solo. The arrangement appeared on Video Games Live's third album which was released in February 2014.

The ensemble's spring 2011 concert featured Mark Cromer, the senior sound designer for Big Huge Games, as a guest banjo player. Cromer joined the GSO for a medley of "Banjo-Kazooie" themes, with an arrangement by tubist David Scherr. Grant Kirkhope, who composed the original music, attended the performance. The spring concert, at which the GSO observed its fifth anniversary, also featured a performance of "Electric de Chocobo" from "Final Fantasy VII" by the Magruder High School Gamer Symphony Orchestra.

Video Games Live again performed GSO's Korobeiniki arrangement, under the title "Tetris Opera," at L.A. Live's Nokia Theatre on June 8, 2011. The show (VGL's 200th) was put on in partnership with the Electronic Entertainment Expo.

Spring 2012 marked the first semester in which the GSO performed outside of the University of Maryland. First, at the Music and Gaming Festival (MAGFest) X, and second at the Smithsonian American Art Museum, as part of the Art of Video Games exhibit.

The ensemble dedicated its spring 2013 concert to the memory of its tubist, David Scherr, who died in December 2012. Shortly after his passing, the orchestra purchased the tuba that Scherr had been renting and had his name engraved on it. The tuba is now loaned to members who are unable to provide their own instrument.

After the 2013 semester ended, Ayla Hurley, Jo Wang, Rob Garner, Laura Stayman, and other alums founded the Washington Metropolitan Gamer Symphony Orchestra in Rockville, MD as an outlet for GSO graduates and other community musicians to come together and perform video game music.

In 2015, the GSO returned to the Smithsonian American Art Museum to perform as part of the “Watch This! Revelations in Media Art” exhibition.

The fall 2015 and spring 2016 semesters marked the 10th year milestone for the GSO’s foundation and first public performance respectively. Alongside the celebrations, in fall 2015, the GSO started live streaming its concerts on Twitch.

In March 2018, the orchestra performed at the Kennedy Center on Millennium Stage, as part of their Direct Current performances, and featured many emeritus members. The orchestra performed various pieces which included Apotheosis, from the game Journey, which was personally approved by the composer Austin Wintory.

== Concertography ==
Performance venues have included the University of Maryland's Hoff Theater, Memorial Chapel and Clarice Smith Performing Arts Center, the Smithsonian American Art Museum, and the Kennedy Center.

Semester	Games Performed (Selection)
2022 Fall	Super Mario 3D World, Pokémon Diamond and Pearl, Undertale, Deltarune, Plants vs. Zombies, Genshin Impact, Dragon Age: Inquisition, Fire Emblem Three Houses, Dragon Quest, Final Fantasy VII, Monster Hunter Rise, Xenoblade Chronicles 2, Sonic the Hedgehog, Bad Piggies, League of Legends, Super Smash Bros. Brawl, Civilization IV
2022 Spring	Super Mario Odyssey, Monster Hunter: World, Pyre, NieR: Automata, NieR: Gestalt/Replicant, Hollow Knight, Pokémon Mystery Dungeon, The Legend of Zelda: Link's Awakening, Genshin Impact, The Legend of Zelda: Twilight Princess, Final Fantasy VII, Europa Universalis IV, MapleStory, Fire Emblem Fates, Kirby Star Allies, Fire Emblem Awakening, Final Fantasy XIII
2021 Fall	Pokémon Gold and Silver, Super Smash Bros. Ultimate, The Legend of Zelda: Ocarina of Time, Plants vs Zombies, Frogger, Kirby & the Amazing Mirror, Octopath Traveler, NieR: Automata, League of Legends, The Legend of Zelda: Breath of the Wild, Journey, Final Fantasy II, Ikenfell, Kingdom Hearts III, Final Fantasy XV, Halo, Uncharted
2019 Fall	Sonic Colors, Kirby Battle Royale, Kirby's Return to Dream Land, Pokémon Super Mystery Dungeon, The Legend of Zelda: Breath of the Wild, Child of Light, Super Mario Galaxy, Super Smash Bros. Brawl, The Legend of Zelda: Ocarina of Time, Kingdom Hearts, Hollow Knight, Fire Emblem Three Houses, Mother, Final Fantasy XIII, Final Fantasy VII, NieR: Automata, Dragon Age: Inquisition
2019 Spring	Super Smash Bros. Melee, Overcooked, The Legend of Zelda: Breath of the Wild, Don't Starve Together, Cuphead, Super Mario Sunshine, MapleStory, Abzû, Final Fantasy VIII, Fire Emblem Fates, Undertale, Destiny 2, Kingdom Hearts III, Final Fantasy XIII-2, Tower of Heaven, NieR: Automata, NieR: Gestalt/Replicant, Civilization VI, Final Fantasy XV
2018 Fall	Octopath Traveler, Zelda II: The Adventure of Link, Super Smash Bros. Melee, Ace Combat 5, Plants vs. Zombies, Mario Kart: Double Dash, Final Fantasy VII, Pokémon Let's Go!, League of Legends, The Legend of Zelda: Twilight Princess, The Legend of Zelda: Breath of the Wild, MapleStory, Fire Emblem: Shadow Dragon, Assassin's Creed IV, Bioshock, Okami, Super Smash Bros. 4, Super Smash Bros. Ultimate, Fire Emblem Awakening
2018 Spring	Monster Hunter, Doki Doki Literature Club!, Deemo, Katamari Damacy, Kirby Air Ride, Guild Wars 2, Journey, MapleStory, Tetris, Xenoblade Chronicles 2, Chrono Trigger, Final Fantasy VII, Pokémon Mystery Dungeon, Final Fantasy VI, The Elder Scrolls V: Skyrim
2017 Spring	Civilization VI, The Legend of Zelda: Ocarina of Time, Okami, Human Resource Machine, Pokémon Gold and Silver, Pony Island, Fire Emblem Awakening, Undertale, Assassin's Creed IV, League of Legends, Fallout 4, Bravely Default, Final Fantasy VII, Bayonetta, Metal Gear Solid, Halo, DuckTales, Pokémon Black and White
2014 Spring	Animal Crossing: New Leaf, Legend of Zelda: Skyward Sword, Mass Effect, Pokémon Red and Blue
2013 Fall	Sam & Max Hit the Road, Final Fantasy VI, Uncharted 2, Mega Man 2
2013 Spring	Kid Icarus, Donkey Kong 64, Journey, The Elder Scrolls V: Skyrim
2012 Fall	MapleStory, Final Fantasy VI, World of Warcraft, The Legend of Zelda: Ocarina of Time
2012 Spring	Dragon Quest, Bastion, flOw, Sonic the Hedgehog, The Legend of Zelda: The Wind Waker
2011 Fall	Pokémon, Shadow of the Colossus, Civilization V, Disgaea: Hour of Darkness, Kingdom Hearts II
2011 Spring	Banjo-Kazooie, Phoenix Wright: Ace Attorney, Oregon Trail, Portal, Secret of Mana
2010 Fall	Xenosaga, Touhou, Mega Man, Donkey Kong Country, Final Fantasy VI
2010 Spring	Super Mario Galaxy, (Note: Arrangement courtesy of the Boston-based Video Game Orchestra.) Final Fantasy XII, The Legend of Zelda: The Wind Waker, Civilization IV
2009 Fall	Final Fantasy IX, Final Fantasy X, Tetris
2009 Spring	Portal, Kingdom Hearts, Katamari Damacy
2008 Fall	Final Fantasy VIII, Warcraft II, Star Fox
2008 Spring	Final Fantasy XIII, Super Mario 64, The Legend of Zelda
2007 Fall	Halo, Star Fox 64, Medal of Honor: Frontline
2007 Spring	Donkey Kong Country 2: Diddy's Kong Quest, Xenosaga, Super Mario RPG
2006 Fall	Super Mario Bros. 2, Tetris, Final Fantasy
2006 Spring	The Legend of Zelda, Final Fantasy, Kingdom Hearts

Full recordings of recent concerts can be downloaded from the group's website.

== Arrangements ==
Group members produce the arrangements that this orchestra performs. Anyone is allowed to submit an arrangement; however, each piece is run through a critique and voted on by the group's music committee (consisting of the music director, the orchestra conductors, choral conductor, and the vice president) before it is accepted and put into the program for a given semester.

== Legacy ==
The Maryland GSO hopes to inspire and assist in the creation of more GSOs in the future. They have openly encouraged high school and college students who are interested in starting a GSO at their school to contact them.

The GSO's fall 2008 concert inspired students at Magruder High School in Rockville, Md., to found their own video game orchestra. The similarly named Magruder Gamer Symphony Orchestra performs regularly at the high school's instrumental music concerts as the only non-classroom ensemble.

In fall 2010, the Maryland GSO helped to establish a similar ensemble at Damascus High School in Damascus, Md.

Upon hearing about the Maryland GSO, a student at Ithaca College founded the Ithaca College GSO in 2011. The ensemble's premiere concert was November 11, 2012.

Tyler Modesto was inspired by the “Art of Video Games” exhibit at the Smithsonian American Art Museum and started the 8-bit Orchestra at the University of Delaware.

== See also ==
- Video game music
- Video Games Live
- Play! A Video Game Symphony
