= Petruccio de Migliolo =

Italian Roman Catholic prelate

Most Reverend Petruccio de Migliolo
- Bishop of Lacedonia
- Church: Catholic Church
- Diocese: Diocese of Lacedonia
- In office: 1463–1481
- Predecessor: Giacomo Porfida
- Successor: Giovanni dei Porcari
- Previous post: Bishop of Bisaccia (1450–1463)

Personal details
- Died: 1486 Lacedonia, Italy

Petruccio de Migliolo (died 1486) was a Roman Catholic prelate who served as Bishop of Lacedonia (1463–1481) and Bishop of Bisaccia (1450–1463).

== Biography ==
On 12 June 1450, Petruccio de Migliolo was appointed during the papacy of Pope Nicholas V as Bishop of Bisaccia. On 30 January 1463, he was appointed during the papacy of Pope Pius II as Bishop of Lacedonia. He served as Bishop of Lacedonia until his death in 1481.

== External links and additional sources ==
- Cheney, David M. "Diocese of Lacedonia". Catholic-Hierarchy.org. (for Chronology of Bishops) ^{[self-published]}
- Chow, Gabriel. "Diocese of Lacedonia (Italy)". GCatholic.org. (for Chronology of Bishops) ^{[self-published]}

Catholic Church titles
| Preceded by | Bishop of Bisaccia; 1450–1463 | Succeeded by Martino de Maggio |
| Preceded by Giacomo Porfida | Bishop of Lacedonia; 1463–1481 | Succeeded by Giovanni dei Porcari |
