= Tommaso Caracciolo (bishop of Gerace) =

Most Reverend Tommaso Caracciolo
- Bishop of Gerace
- Church: Catholic Church
- Diocese: Diocese of Gerace
- In office: 1687–1689
- Predecessor: Stefano Sculco
- Successor: Domenico Diez de Aux

Orders
- Ordination: 22 September 1663
- Consecration: 4 May 1687

Personal details
- Born: 30 June 1640 Naples, Italy
- Died: 31 March 1689 (age 48) Gerace, Italy

Tommaso Caracciolo, O.S.B. (30 June 1640 – 31 March 1689) was a Roman Catholic prelate who served as Bishop of Gerace (1687–1689).

== Biography ==
Tommaso Caracciolo was born in Naples, Italy on 30 June 1640 and ordained a priest in the Order of Saint Benedict on 22 September 1663. On 28 April 1687, he was appointed during the papacy of Pope Innocent XI as Bishop of Gerace. On 4 May 1687, he was consecrated bishop by Marcantonio Barbarigo, Archbishop of Corfù, with Pier Antonio Capobianco, Bishop Emeritus of Lacedonia, and Stefano Giuseppe Menatti, Titular Bishop of Cyrene, serving as co-consecrators. He served as Bishop of Gerace until his death on 4 May 1687.

== See also ==
- Catholic Church in Italy

== External links and additional sources ==
- Cheney, David M. "Diocese of Locri-Gerace (-Santa Maria di Polsi)". Catholic-Hierarchy.org.(for Chronology of Bishops) ^{[self-published]}
- Chow, Gabriel. "Diocese of Locri–Gerace (Italy)". GCatholic.org. (for Chronology of Bishops) ^{[self-published]}

Catholic Church titles
Preceded by Stefano Sculco	Bishop of Gerace; 1687–1689	Succeeded by Domenico Diez de Aux
