= Ferdinando Bruno =

Most Reverend Giacomo Candido
- Bishop of Lacedonia
- Church: Catholic Church
- Diocese: Diocese of Lacedonia
- In office: 1625–1648
- Predecessor: Gian Gerolamo Campanili
- Successor: Gian Giacomo Cristoforo

Orders
- Consecration: 28 October 1625 by Ottavio Bandini

Personal details
- Born: 1593 Florence, Italy
- Died: 1648 (age 55) Lacedonia, Italy

Ferdinando Bruno, O.F.M. (1593-1648) was a Roman Catholic prelate who served as Bishop of Lacedonia (1625–1648).

== Biography ==
Giacomo Candido was born in Florence, Italy in 1593. On 6 October 1625, he was appointed during the papacy of Pope Urban VIII as Bishop of Lacedonia. On 28 October 1625, he was consecrated bishop by Ottavio Bandini, Cardinal-Bishop of Porto e Santa Rufina. He served as Bishop of Lacedonia until his death in 1648.

== External links and additional sources ==
- Cheney, David M. "Diocese of Lacedonia". Catholic-Hierarchy.org. (for Chronology of Bishops)^{[self-published]}
- Chow, Gabriel. "Diocese of Lacedonia (Italy)". GCatholic.org. (for Chronology of Bishops) ^{[self-published]}

Catholic Church titles
Preceded by Gian Gerolamo Campanili	Bishop of Lacedonia; 1625–1648	Succeeded by Gian Giacomo Cristoforo
