= Gianfranco Carducci =

Italian Roman Catholic bishop

Most Reverend Gianfranco Carducci
- Bishop of Lacedonia
- Church: Catholic Church
- Diocese: Diocese of Lacedonia
- In office: 1565–1585
- Predecessor: Fabio Capelleto
- Successor: Marco Pedacca

Personal details
- Died: 22 February 1584 Lacedonia, Italy

Gianfranco Carducci (died) was a Roman Catholic prelate who served as Bishop of Lacedonia (1565–1585).

== Biography ==
On 26 May 1565, Gianfranco Carducci was appointed during the papacy of Pope Pius IV as Bishop of Lacedonia. He served as Bishop of Lacedonia until his death on 22 February 1584.

== External links and additional sources ==
- Cheney, David M. "Diocese of Lacedonia". Catholic-Hierarchy.org. (for Chronology of Bishops) ^{[self-published]}
- Chow, Gabriel. "Diocese of Lacedonia (Italy)". GCatholic.org. (for Chronology of Bishops) ^{[self-published]}

Catholic Church titles
Preceded by Fabio Capelleto	Bishop of Lacedonia; 1565–1585	Succeeded by Marco Pedacca
