= Scipione Dura =

Most Reverend Scipione Dura
- Bishop of Lacedonia
- Church: Catholic Church
- Diocese: Diocese of Lacedonia
- In office: 1538–1551
- Predecessor: Antonio Dura
- Successor: Fabio Capelleto

Personal details
- Died: 1551 Lacedonia, Italy

Scipione Dura (died 1551) was a Roman Catholic prelate who served as Bishop of Lacedonia (1538–1551).

On 23 September 1538, Scipione Dura was appointed during the papacy of Pope Paul II as Bishop of Lacedonia. He served as Bishop of Lacedonia until his death in 1551.

== External links and additional sources ==
- Cheney, David M. "Diocese of Lacedonia". Catholic-Hierarchy.org. (for Chronology of Bishops) ^{[self-published]}
- Chow, Gabriel. "Diocese of Lacedonia (Italy)". GCatholic.org. (for Chronology of Bishops) ^{[self-published]}

Catholic Church titles
Preceded by Antonio Dura	Bishop of Lacedonia; 1538–1551	Succeeded by Fabio Capelleto
