= Antonio Dura =

Bishop of Lacedonia (1506-1538)

Most Reverend Antonio Dura
- Bishop of Lacedonia
- Church: Catholic Church
- Diocese: Diocese of Lacedonia
- In office: 1506–1538
- Predecessor: Niccolò de Rubini
- Successor: Scipione Dura

Antonio Dura was a Roman Catholic prelate who served as Bishop of Lacedonia (1506–1538).

== Biography ==
On 29 July 1506, Antonio Dura was appointed during the papacy of Pope Julius II as Bishop of Lacedonia. He served as Bishop of Lacedonia until his resignation in 1538.

== External links and additional sources ==
- Cheney, David M. "Diocese of Lacedonia". Catholic-Hierarchy.org. (for Chronology of Bishops) ^{[self-published]}
- Chow, Gabriel. "Diocese of Lacedonia (Italy)". GCatholic.org. (for Chronology of Bishops) ^{[self-published]}

Catholic Church titles
Preceded by Niccolò de Rubini	Bishop of Lacedonia; 1506–1538	Succeeded by Scipione Dura
