= Francesco Oliva =

Italian Roman Catholic bishop (born 1951)

- Bishop of the Diocese of Locri-Gerace
- Coat of arms of Francesco Oliva
- Church: Roman Catholic Church
- See: Roman Catholic Diocese of Locri-Gerace
- In office: 2014
- Predecessor: Giuseppe Fiorini Morosini
- Successor: incumbent
- Previous post(s): Prelate

Orders
- Ordination: 5 January 1976
- Consecration: 5 May 2014 by Nunzio Galantino

Personal details
- Born: 14 January 1951 (age 74); Papasidero, Italy

Francesco Oliva (born 14 January 1951 in Papasidero) is an Italian Roman Catholic bishop.

Ordained to the priesthood in 1976, Oliva was named bishop of the Roman Catholic Diocese of Locri-Gerace, Italy in May 2014.
