= Fabio Capelleto =

16th-century Roman Catholic bishop

Most Reverend Fabio Capelleto
- Bishop of Lacedonia
- Church: Catholic Church
- Diocese: Diocese of Lacedonia
- In office: 1551–1565
- Predecessor: Scipione Dura
- Successor: Gianfranco Carducci

Orders
- Consecration: 24 February 1555 by Giovanni Michele Saraceni

Fabio Capelleto was a Roman Catholic prelate who served as Bishop of Lacedonia (1551–1565).

== Biography ==
On 24 July 1551, he was appointed during the papacy of Pope Julius III as Bishop of Lacedonia. On 24 February 1555, he was consecrated bishop by Giovanni Michele Saraceni, Archbishop of Acerenza e Matera, with Ascanio Ferreri, Bishop Emeritus of Montepeloso, and Fabio Mirto Frangipani, Bishop of Caiazzo, serving as co-consecrators. He served as Bishop of Lacedonia until his resignation in 1565.

== External links and additional sources ==
- Cheney, David M. "Diocese of Lacedonia". Catholic-Hierarchy.org. (for Chronology of Bishops) ^{[self-published]}
- Chow, Gabriel. "Diocese of Lacedonia (Italy)". GCatholic.org. (for Chronology of Bishops) ^{[self-published]}

Catholic Church titles
Preceded by Scipione Dura	Bishop of Lacedonia; 1551–1565	Succeeded by Gianfranco Carducci
