= Giacomo Giordano =

17th-century Roman Catholic bishop

Most Reverend Giacomo Giordano
- Bishop of Lacedonia
- Church: Catholic Church
- Diocese: Diocese of Lacedonia
- In office: 1651–1661
- Predecessor: Ambrosio Viola
- Successor: Pier Antonio Capobianco

Orders
- Consecration: 29 Oct 1651 by Niccolò Albergati-Ludovisi

Personal details
- Died: 9 November 1661

Giacomo Giordano, O.S.B. (died 1661) was a Roman Catholic prelate who served as Bishop of Lacedonia (1651–1661).

== Biography ==
Giacomo Giordano was ordained a priest in Order of Saint Benedict. On 28 Oct 1651, he was appointed during the papacy of Pope Innocent X as Bishop of Lacedonia. On 29 Oct 1651, he was consecrated bishop by Niccolò Albergati-Ludovisi, Archbishop of Bologna, with Girolamo Buonvisi, Titular Archbishop of Laodicea in Phrygia, and Ranuccio Scotti Douglas, Bishop of Borgo San Donnino, serving as co-consecrators. He served as Bishop of Lacedonia until his death on 9 Nov 1661.

== External links and additional sources ==
- Cheney, David M. "Diocese of Lacedonia". Catholic-Hierarchy.org. (for Chronology of Bishops) ^{[self-published]}
- Chow, Gabriel. "Diocese of Lacedonia (Italy)". GCatholic.org. (for Chronology of Bishops) ^{[self-published]}

Catholic Church titles
| Preceded by Ambrosio Viola | Bishop of Lacedonia; 1651–1661 | Succeeded by Pier Antonio Capobianco |
