= Polisportiva Bisaccese =

Italian football club

Bisaccese
- Full name: Polisportiva Bisaccese
- Founded: 1967 (as U.S. Bisaccese); 1982 (as Pol. Bisaccese)
- Ground: Stadio Aldo Scotece, Bisaccia, Italy
- Capacity: 600
- League: Eccellenza Campania – B
- 2006–07: Promozione Campania – C, 1st
Home colours	Away colours

Polisportiva Bisaccese is an Italian football club based in Bisaccia, Campania. It was founded in 1967 as U.S. Bisaccia. Following a "schism" in the club in 1974–75, a new bisaccese team was founded, the Vis Acies Bisaccia. In 1982 the two teams merged again as Polisportiva Bisaccese. In 1989–90 they won the Seconda Categoria Championship and were promoted in Prima Categoria. In the following season, Bisaccese arrived 4th in Prima Categoria and was admitted in Promozione.

In 2006–07 season, Bisaccese played in Promozione Campania Group C, where fought for promotion against strong clubs such as Nola and Forza e Coraggio. At the end of the championship Bisaccese and Forza e Coraggio arrived both first, and they had to play a promotion playoff. Eventually Bisaccese was defeated by Forza e Coraggio in the playoff 1–0 AET. However Bisaccese was later admitted in the Eccellenza Championship.

In 2007–08 Bisaccese played for the first time in its history in Eccellenza Campania Group B. The club in this season tries to avoid relegation.

== Chronology ==
- 1993–94: 7th in Promozione Campania Group C
- 1994–95: 6th in Promozione Campania Group C
- 1995–96: 8th in Promozione Campania Group C
- 1996–97: 12th in Promozione Campania Group C
- 1997–98: ? in Promozione Campania Group C
- 1998–99: ? in Promozione Campania Group C
- 1999–00: ? in Promozione Campania Group C
- 2000–01: ? in Promozione Campania Group C
- 2001–02: ? in Promozione Campania Group C
- 2002–03: ? in Promozione Campania Group C
- 2003–04: 3rd in Promozione Campania Group C
- 2004–05: 11th in Promozione Campania Group C
- 2005–06: 3rd in Promozione Campania Group C
- 2006–07: 1st in Promozione Campania Group C. They lose promotion playoff against Forza e Coraggio but were later admitted in Eccellenza.
- 2007–08: Eccellenza Campania Group B.
