= Giovanni dei Porcari =

Roman Catholic bishop

Most Reverend Giovanni dei Porcari
- Bishop of Lacedonia
- Church: Catholic Church
- Diocese: Diocese of Lacedonia
- In office: 1481–1486
- Predecessor: Petruccio de Migliolo
- Successor: Niccolò de Rubini

Personal details
- Died: 1486 Lacedonia, Italy

Giovanni dei Porcari (died 1486) was a Roman Catholic prelate who served as Bishop of Lacedonia (1481–1486).

== Biography ==
On 27 August 1481, Giovanni dei Porcari was appointed during the papacy of Pope Sixtus IV as Bishop of Lacedonia. He served as Bishop of Lacedonia until his death in 1486.

== External links and additional sources ==
- Cheney, David M. "Diocese of Lacedonia". Catholic-Hierarchy.org. (for Chronology of Bishops) ^{[self-published]}
- Chow, Gabriel. "Diocese of Lacedonia (Italy)". GCatholic.org. (for Chronology of Bishops) ^{[self-published]}

Catholic Church titles
Preceded by Petruccio de Migliolo	Bishop of Lacedonia; 1481–1486	Succeeded by Niccolò de Rubini
