= Benedetto Bartolo =

Italian Roman Catholic prelate

Most Reverend Benedetto Bartolo
- Bishop of Belcastro
- Church: Catholic Church
- In office: 1684–1685
- Predecessor: Carlo Galgano
- Successor: Giovanni Alfonso Petrucci
- Previous post: Bishop of Lacedonia (1672–1684)

Orders
- Ordination: 11 March 1668
- Consecration: 18 September 1672 by Cesare Facchinetti

Personal details
- Born: 16 December 1627 Giarutana, Italy
- Died: November 1685 (age 57) Belcastro, Italy

Benedetto Bartolo (1627–1684) was a Roman Catholic prelate who served as Bishop of Belcastro (1684–1685) and Bishop of Lacedonia (1672–1684).

== Biography ==
Benedetto Bartolo was born in Giarutana, Italy on 16 December 1627 and ordained a priest on 11 March 1668. On 12 September 1672, he was appointed by Pope Clement X as Bishop of Lacedonia. On 18 September 1672, he was consecrated bishop by Cesare Facchinetti, Bishop of Spoleto. On 18 September 1684, he was appointed by Pope Innocent XI as Bishop of Belcastro. He served as Bishop of Belcastro until his death in November 1685.

== Episcopal succession ==
While bishop, he was the principal co-consecrator of:

- Giambattista Morea, Bishop of Lacedonia (1684);
- Pietro Luigi Malaspina, Bishop of Cortona (1684); and
- Giovanni Riccanale, Bishop of Boiano (1684).

== External links and additional sources ==
- Cheney, David M. "Diocese of Lacedonia". Catholic-Hierarchy.org. (for Chronology of Bishops) ^{[self-published]}
- Chow, Gabriel. "Diocese of Lacedonia (Italy)". GCatholic.org. (for Chronology of Bishops) ^{[self-published]}
- Cheney, David M. "Diocese of Belcastro". Catholic-Hierarchy.org. (for Chronology of Bishops) ^{[self-published]}
- Chow, Gabriel. "Titular Episcopal See of Belcastro (Italy)". GCatholic.org. (for Chronology of Bishops) ^{[self-published]}

Catholic Church titles
Preceded by Pier Antonio Capobianco	Bishop of Lacedonia; 1672–1684	Succeeded by Giambattista Morea
Preceded by Carlo Galgano	Bishop of Belcastro; 1684–1685	Succeeded by Giovanni Alfonso Petrucci
