= Lacedonia Cathedral =

Cathedral in Lacedonia, Italy

Coordinates: 41.0498°N 15.4239°E

Lacedonia Cathedral (Italian: Concattedrale di Santa Maria Assunta, Duomo di Lacedonia) is a Roman Catholic cathedral dedicated to the Assumption of the Virgin Mary in Lacedonia in Campania, Italy. Formerly the seat of the bishops of Lacedonia, since 1986 it has been a co-cathedral in the diocese of Ariano Irpino-Lacedonia.

== History ==
Lacedonia has been the seat of a bishopric since the 11th century. The present church however was built at the end of the 17th century, after an earthquake had almost completely destroyed the town. The works, under the direction of Bishop Gian Battista La Morea, began with the laying of the first stone on 28 September 1689 and were completed in 1709. The former cathedral had been inconveniently distant from the town and the new one was laid out on the site of four old churches or chapels in the centre of the inhabited area. As an inscription records, the cathedral was consecrated on 19 October 1766 by Bishop Nicola D'Amato, who was also responsible for the internal decoration of the building and its elevation to the status of a minor basilica. Initially it had only one nave; the two side aisles were added in 1860. The building was damaged by earthquakes in 1930 and 1980, and was restored each time with some modifications to the structure.

== Description ==
The west front has a fine central portal in stone, flanked by a bell tower in travertine, built in 1751. The interior, divided into three aisles, preserves works from the 17th and 18th centuries. The most significant is a wooden altar of the 16th century painted with a triptych of high-quality workmanship but uncertain attribution: in the 19th century it was attributed to Andrea Sabatini of Salerno or Francesco da Tolentino, but since the latest restoration it has been attributed to Antoniazzo Romano or a member of his school. On the central part of the triptych is the figure of the Virgin Mary holding the Christ child who is giving a blessing and holding a swallow in his left hand, while on the two sides are the figures of saints and archangels.

== Bibliography ==
- Bardaro, Mons. Salvatore, 1986: La Cattedrale di Lacedonia tra passato e presente, dal 1696 al 1986
