= Video Games Live =

Video game music concert series

- Genre: Video game music, symphonic, orchestral, choir
- Years active: 2002–present
- Inaugurated: July 6, 2005; 21 years ago (at the Hollywood Bowl, Los Angeles, California)
- Founders: Tommy Tallarico; Jack Wall
- Most recent: April 22, 2025, Salt Lake City, UT, USA
- Area: Worldwide
- Website: videogameslive.com

Video Games Live (VGL) is a concert series created by Tommy Tallarico and Jack Wall. The concerts consist of segments of video game music performed by a live orchestra with video footage and synchronized lighting and effects, as well as several interactive segments with the audience. Incorporated in 2002, Video Games Live has performed over 500 shows internationally.

== History ==
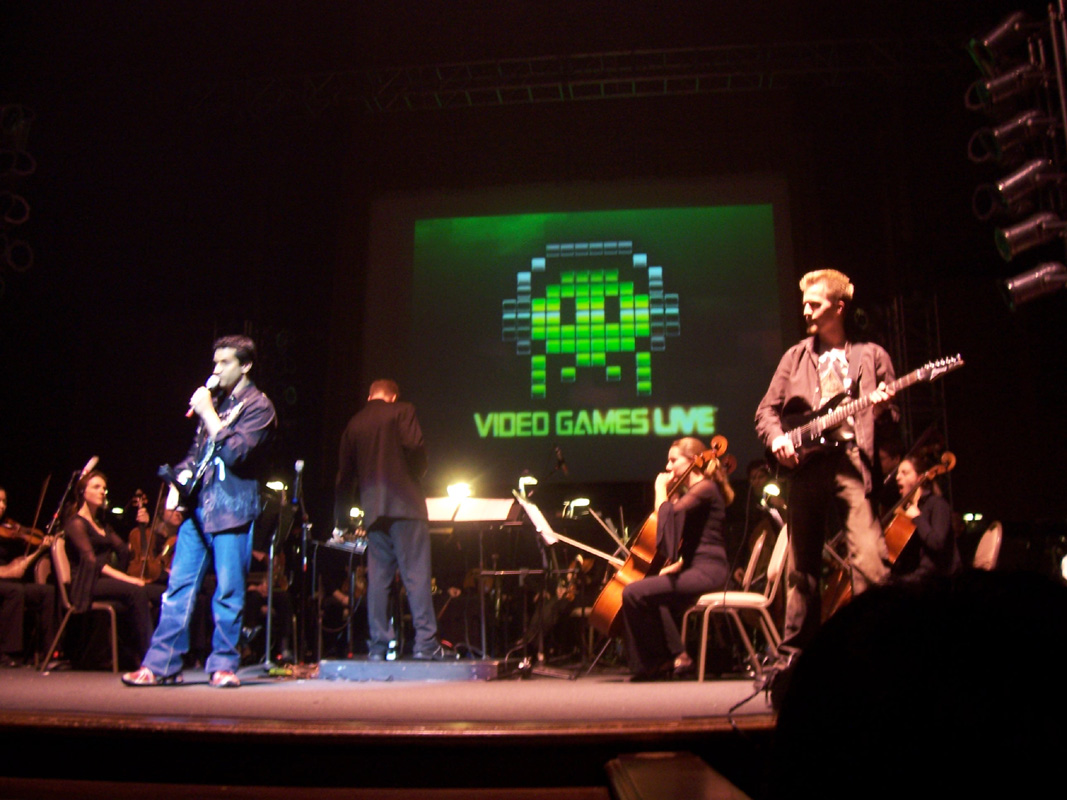
Tommy Tallarico (left) addressing the audience at Video Games Live 2007

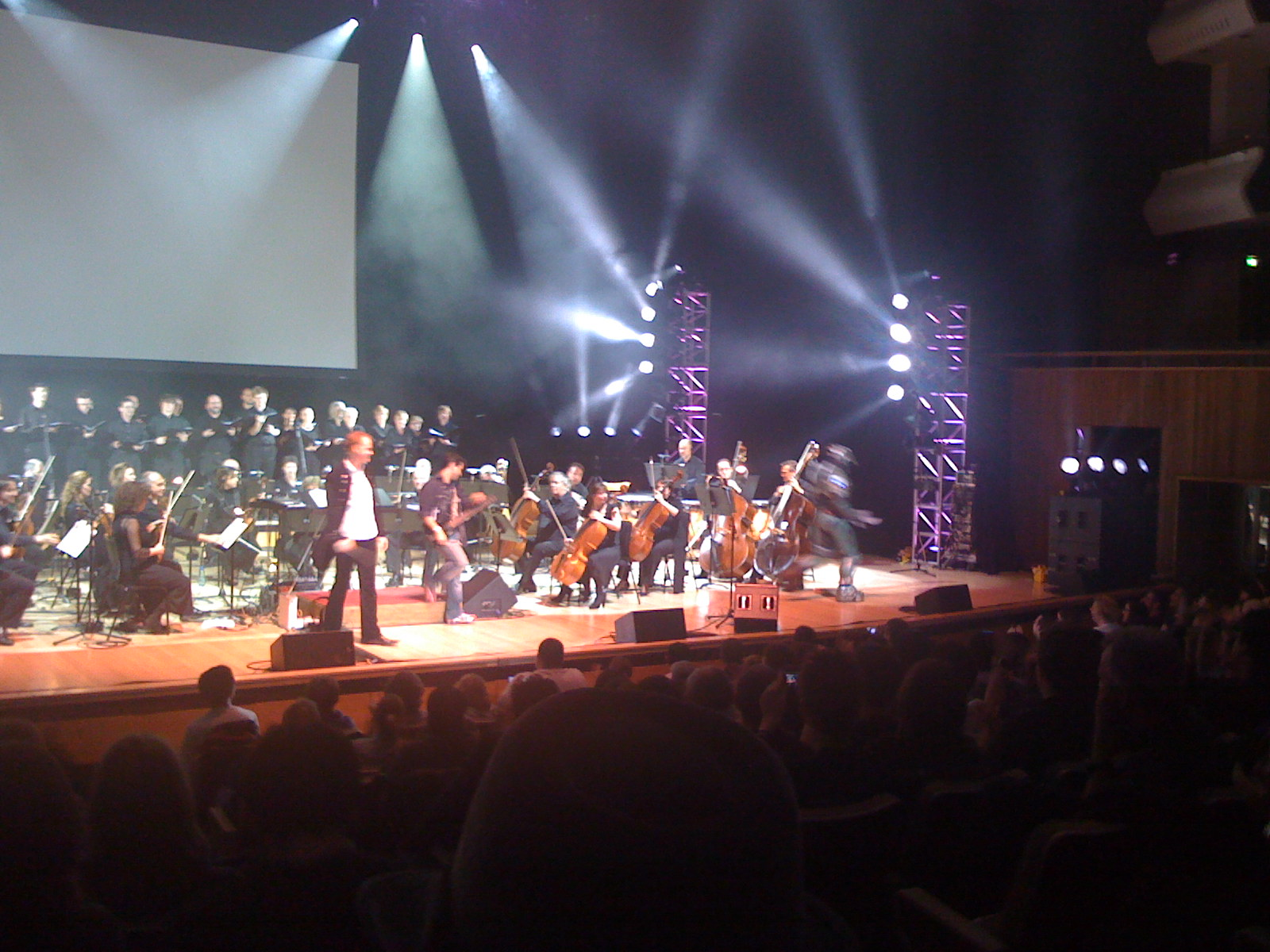
October 24, 2008 Video Games Live performance

Video Games Live was founded by video game composers Tommy Tallarico and Jack Wall in 2002, and the duo formed Mystical Stone Entertainment, the business that runs VGL. Over the next three years, Tallarico and Wall planned the show and developed the technologies needed to synchronize lights, videos, effects, and the music itself. They also developed technology for communicating between the conductor, the technicians, and the performers.

The concert debuted on July 6, 2005, at the Hollywood Bowl, where the Los Angeles Philharmonic Orchestra performed to an audience of 11,000 people. Three concerts were held the first year. In 2006, the concert re-launched with an 11-show world tour. The concert was expanded to 30 cities in 2007 and 47 cities in 2008, and over 50 cities in 2009. More than 300 shows were held between 2009 and 2016. In 2010, Jack Wall left Video Games Live to pursue his game composing career.

Each concert is performed by a local symphonic orchestra and musicians. Video Games Live has performed for millions of people across the globe, including in the Middle East, China, South Korea, Japan, Europe, South America, and Australia. In 2015, VGL performed at Red Rocks Amphitheatre with more than 200 musicians on stage including the Colorado Symphony and Choir. In 2016, 2 shows were performed at the Bird's Nest National Olympic Stadium in Beijing to over 30,000 people. Tallarico chooses different songs for each show, based upon the area's favorite game series (such as Final Fantasy in Japan and League of Legends in South Korea) and by asking fans at future venues what songs they would like to hear. Over the past decade, Video Games Live has performed with symphonies including the National Symphony Orchestra, the Pittsburgh Symphony, the San Francisco Symphony, the National Taiwan Symphony Orchestra, the Spanish National Orchestra, the Polish National Radio Symphony Orchestra and the Qatar Philharmonic.

== Segments ==
Video Games Live features more than 175 unique music segments from video games of all eras, such as Final Fantasy, Halo, World of Warcraft, Sonic the Hedgehog, The Legend of Zelda, Kingdom Hearts, and Metal Gear Solid. Other segments feature retro arcade games such as Tetris and Donkey Kong. Video footage of each game is shown during its segment, and this is often accompanied by special effects.

The pre-show event features a costume—or cosplay—contest for people dressing as video game characters. Another contest has concert-goers playing classic games, such as Frogger or Space Invaders, or musical video games, such as Guitar Hero. The winner of these contests is taken up on stage during the show, and plays the game in front of the audience and along with the orchestra.

The concerts often feature solo performers. Martin Leung, who became known on the Internet for playing video game songs on a piano while blindfolded, routinely performed during the concerts between 2005 and 2012. Also discovered on the internet, vocalist and multi-instrumentalist Laura Intravia appears at the shows often, as well as Lindsey Stirling, Malukah, Peter Hollens, and brentalfloss. VGL occasionally features local video game cover bands like The Megas and Random Encounter. During performances Tallarico plays guitar for some segments, from worldbeat-like folk for Chrono Trigger to heavy metal for Final Fantasy VII and themes from Castlevania. Large screens are set up behind the symphony and synchronized to the music. In general, the visuals are from the video game the song being played. However, there are non-video game films presented to connect the music to other areas: for Medal of Honor, a series of video games devoted to military combat, the screen shows real films from World War II, and for Disney's Kingdom Hearts, the historic Disney films the game is based on are screened.

The show involves interactive segments where audience members can play video games, synchronized in real-time by the orchestra. The concerts on occasion feature interviews with video game composers, sometimes live or through video. Examples of invited composers include Koji Kondo, composer of Mario and Zelda; Marty O'Donnell and Mike Salvatori, composers of Halo and Destiny; Wataru Hokoyama, who composed the soundtrack to Afrika; Austin Wintory, the first video game composer nominated for a Grammy for Best Score Soundtrack for the music in Journey; Christopher Tin, the first video game composer to win a Grammy for his song "Baba Yetu" on Civilization IV; Peter McConnell and Clint Bajakian of Monkey Island; Russell Brower, who composed music for the World of Warcraft and StarCraft series; and Ellen McLain, the voice of GLaDOS from Portal. In post-show Meet & Greets, VGL has hosted guests such as Shigeru Miyamoto, creator of Mario and Zelda; Gabe Newell, founder of Valve; and Sid Meier, creator of the Civilization series.

List of Video Games Live orchestra segments
- Advent Rising
- Afrika
- Assassin's Creed II
- Assassin's Creed IV: Black Flag
- Assassin's Creed Syndicate
- Banner Saga 2
- Beyond Good & Evil
- Bioshock
- Broken Age
- Castlevania
- Cave Story
- Chrono Cross – "Radical Dreamers"
- Chrono Trigger/Chrono Cross
- Civilization IV – "Baba Yetu"
- Classic Arcade Medley
- Command & Conquer: Red Alert – "Hell March"
- Conan
- Crysis
- Destiny – "Union"
- Diablo II – "Main Theme"
- Diablo III – "Main Theme"
- Diablo III – "Ending Cinematic"
- Diablo III – "Leah"
- Diablo III – "Opening Cinematic"
- Diablo III - Heavens
- Donkey Kong Country
- DOTA 2 – "Cinematic"
- DOTA 2 – "Call to Arms"
- DOTA 2 – "China Start Up"
- DOTA 2 – "First Blood"
- DOTA 2 – "Reborn"
- DOTA 2 – "Shifting Snows"
- DOTA 2 – "Spoils of War"
- Earthworm Jim
- End of Nations
- Everquest II
- Fantasia
- Final Fantasy VI – "Opera Remix" featuring Jillian Aversa
- Final Fantasy VII – "Aerith's Theme"
- Final Fantasy VII – "One Winged Angel"
- Final Fantasy VIII – "Liberi Fatali"
- God of War
- Grim Fandango
- Halo 1 & 2
- Halo 3: ODST
- Halo Trilogy
- Halo: Reach
- Harry Potter
- Headhunter
- Hearthstone – "Pull Up A Chair"
- Heroes of Might & Magic
- Heroes of the Storm – "Battle"
- Honor of Kings – "Hero is Back"
- Honor of Kings – "Main Theme"
- Honor of Kings – "New Year"
- ICO
- Jade Empire
- James Bond
- Journey
- Kingdom Hearts
- Lair
- League of Legends - "Nami"
- League of Legends – "Challenger"
- Lord of the Rings – "Rohan"
- Mario Bros.
- Mass Effect
- Medal of Honor
- Mega Man
- Metal Gear Solid
- Metal Gear Solid 3 - "Snake Eater"
- Metroid
- Monkey Island
- Mother/Earthbound
- Myst
- Need For Speed: Undercover
- Okami
- Overwatch – "Cinematic"
- Overwatch – "Dragons"
- Overwatch – "Overture"
- Overwatch – "The Last Bastion"
- Phoenix Wright
- Pokémon
- Red Dead Redemption
- Resident Evil 5
- Shadow of the Colossus
- Silent Hill II
- Skyrim
- Sonic
- StarCraft II – "Main Theme"
- StarCraft II – "Swarm Ending Cinematic"
- StarCraft II – "Swarm Overture"
- StarCraft II – "Void"
- Still Alive
- Street Fighter II
- Super Mario World
- Super Smash Bros.
- Syberia
- Tetris
- The Witcher 3: Wild Hunt
- Tom Clancy
- Tomb Raider
- Top Gear
- Tron
- Uncharted 2
- Warcraft - "Montage"
- World of Warcraft – "Dark Portal"
- World of Warcraft – "Lament of the Highborne"
- World of Warcraft – "Mountains of Thunder"
- World of Warcraft – "Northrend"
- World of Warcraft – "Thunder King"
- World of Warcraft – "BGM Suite"
- World of Warcraft: Burning Crusade – "Black Temple"
- World of Warcraft: Burning Crusade – "Legion"
- World of Warcraft: Cataclysm – "Nightsong"
- World of Warcraft: Cataclysm – "Opening Cinematic"
- World of Warcraft: Legion – "Canticle of Sacrifice"
- World of Warcraft: Legion – "Trailer"
- World of Warcraft: Mists of Pandaria – "Heart of Pandaria"
- World of Warcraft: Mists of Pandaria – "Serpent"
- World of Warcraft: Mists of Pandaria Cinematic
- World of Warcraft: Warlords of Draenor – "Cinematic"
- World of Warcraft: Warlords of Draenor – "Malach Angel Messenger"
- World of Warcraft: Warlords of Draenor "Magnificent Desolation"
- World of Warcraft: Wrath of the Lich King - "Invincible"
- World of Warcraft: Wrath of the Lich King - "Main Title"
- World of Warcraft: Wrath of the Lich King - "Opening Cinematic (Arthus)"
- Xenoblade
- Zelda – "Main Theme"
- Zelda – "Medley" featuring Lindsey Stirling
- Zelda – "Lullaby" featuring Jillian Aversa
- Zelda – "The Celtic Link"
- Zelda – "25th Anniversary" featuring Laura Intravia
List of Video Games Live interactive segments
- Frogger
- Guitar Hero III – "Hold the Line" by Toto
- Guitar Hero III – "The Pretender" by The Foo Fighters
- Guitar Hero: Aerosmith – "Sweet Emotion"
- Guitar Hero: Van Halen – "Jump"
- Ralph Baer – Brown Box segment
- Space Invaders
List of Video Games Live soloist segments
- brentalfloss - 2-2 Mario Blues
- Dee Baker - Classic Arcade
- Dee Baker - Gears of War SFX
- Dee Baker - SFX
- Ellen McLain - Portal: Still Alive
- Ellen McLain - Portal 2: The Turret Opera
- Koji Kondo - Mario Medley
- Laura Intravia – Mario Medley
- Laura Intravia – Zelda Flute Link
- Lindsey Stirling – Zelda
- Malukah – Skyrim "Dragonborn Comes"
- Martin Leung - Advent Children
- Martin Leung - Angry Birds
- Martin Leung - BioShock "Cohen's Masterpiece"
- Martin Leung - Chrono Cross
- Martin Leung - Dragon Quest
- Martin Leung - Earthworm Jim
- Martin Leung - Final Fantasy Medley
- Martin Leung - Mario Blindfolded
- Martin Leung - Monkey Island
- Martin Leung - Namco Compilation
- Martin Leung - Rare Software Medley
- Martin Leung - Tetris
- Martin Leung - Warcraft II
- Martin Leung - Zelda
- Peter Hollens - Portal 2
- Random Encounter – Final Fantasy
- Random Encounter - Zelda Medley
- Richard Jacques - Out Run
- Riva Taylor - The Creed (Assassin's Creed Unity)
- Vertex Guy - Contra

== Albums ==
Video Games Live, Volume 1, a recording of various segments from multiple shows, was released on July 22, 2008. The music on the album was performed by the Slovak National Symphony Orchestra (except where noted), and was released by EMI Classics. It debuted at #10 on the Billboard Top 10 for Classical Music Crossovers. It was also named 2008 Best Video Game Soundtrack from both IGN and G.A.N.G.

Video Games Live: Level 2 was released as a DVD, Blu-ray and CD on October 19, 2010, by Shout! Factory. This was a live recording which coincided with their national television special on PBS. The music was performed by the Louisiana Philharmonic Orchestra (except where noted), and debuted at #8 on the Billboard charts, at a live show in New Orleans.

Despite the success of the first two albums, the large upfront costs of hiring so many musicians and renting out studio time made it unattractive for record companies. Video Games Live: Level 3 was released in 2014, and was funded by 5,679 fans on Kickstarter, beating its goal of $250,000 by $35,081. Unlike the previous albums, this one was recorded in a studio featuring a full orchestra, a 60-person choir, a full rock band and video game composers from around the world. Each segment was personally arranged and orchestrated by their original composers and input from the game designers, developers, and publishers was used, some of which were invited to play in the record themselves. The album was the third-largest album funded on Kickstarter at the time. Level 3 was recorded in a studio with over 175 musicians, primarily the City of Prague Philharmonic Orchestra and Chorus, conducted by Emmanuel Fratianni and mixed at Skywalker Ranch by Leslie Ann Jones. The album featured compositions and performances by Akira Yamaoka (Silent Hill), Norihiko Hibino (Metal Gear Solid), and Jillian Aversa (God of War and Halo). It also had performances by Laura Intravia ("Flute Link") and Chris Kline (Vertexguy). The album also featured a live version of Portal's "Still Alive" performed in Chile, in which the audience can be heard cheering, chanting, and singing along.

Video Games Live: Level 4 was released in 2015. Like Level 3, it was funded by a Kickstarter campaign, and passed its goal of $150,000, to reach $187,646. Also like Level 3, it was performed by the Prague Philharmonic Orchestra and Chorus and conducted by Fratianni. As a bonus for exceeding the financial goal of the Kickstarter campaign, VGL released Through Time and Space: Chrono Piano Album concomitantly. It features music composed by Yasunori Mitsuda for the games Chrono Cross and Chrono Trigger, with the piano versions arranged by Laura Intravia (also providing vocals) and performed by Brendon Shapiro.

Video Games Live: Level 5 was released in 2016. VGL also used Kickstarter, raising $264,931 through 3,658 backers. VGL worked with the Prague Philharmonic with Eímear Noone conducting and Leslie Ann Jones engineering at Skywalker Ranch. As a bonus for exceeding the goal, the project includes a documentary on the making of the music, plus added tracks. The project involved another piano album, Shall we Play? Majora's Mask Piano Album, featuring music from Legend of Zelda: Majora's Mask, arranged by Intravia and performed by Shapiro.

== PBS Special ==
The April 1, 2010, New Orleans (Level 2) concert was taped and broadcast on July 31, 2010, on PBS. The special was later released on DVD and Blu-ray in 2010 and contains additional segments, behind the scenes footage, making of Video Games Live, interactive angles, exclusive game developer and composer interviews, and special never before seen game trailers. The PBS special appeared in the United States, and was also broadcast multiple times on Sky Arts TV in the United Kingdom and other European countries.

== Legacy ==
Video Games Live has been praised for bridging the generational gap by showing older generations that video game music is not just "bleeps and bloops". Wall and Tallarico saw the concert as a way to show "how culturally significant video games and video game music are in the world today." Tallarico often contends that, were Beethoven alive today, he would compose music for video games as a comment about the relevance for new media on the classical music artform.

VGL also aims to show video gamers how moving classical music is. As Emily Reese, a host for Classical Minnesota Public Radio, noted concerning a 2010 VGL show, "89 percent of attendees had never been to Orchestra Hall for a classical concerts [...] and fifty percent had never even stepped through its doors." By performing with local orchestras at each location, Tallarico hopes VGL encourages video gamers to attend more classical concerts. He comments that parents often send grateful letters about their children picking up a musical instrument after a concert.

When the show is performed in Brazil, it is subsidized by the government for getting young people involved in the arts. In March 2016, VGL was placed in the Guinness Book of World Records for two accomplishments: the most number of shows by a symphony (357 at the time), and another for largest audience to ever watch a symphony show live (752,109 people in Beijing, China in 2015, despite the venue only having 2,700 seats).

VGL was profiled on the cover of Symphony Magazine in 2014 and it has performed at gaming industry events including E3, Gamescom, Tokyo Game Show, the Game Developers Conference, Gen Con, and San Diego Comic-Con. It has been featured on classical music radio stations.

== Awards ==
- Guinness World Records
  - Most video game concerts performed (2016)
  - Largest audience for a video game music concert (2016)

== See also ==
- Gamer Symphony Orchestra at the University of Maryland
- Video Game Orchestra
- Distant Worlds
