= Porcaro (surname) =

Porcaro is a surname. Notable people with the surname include:

- Joe Porcaro (1930–2020), American drummer
- Porcaro brothers, American musicians and members of the rock band Toto, sons of Joe Porcaro
  - Jeff Porcaro (1954–1992), American drummer
  - Mike Porcaro (1955–2015), American bassist
  - Steve Porcaro (born 1957), American keyboardist
