= Martin Leung =

Video Game Pianist

Video Game Pianist
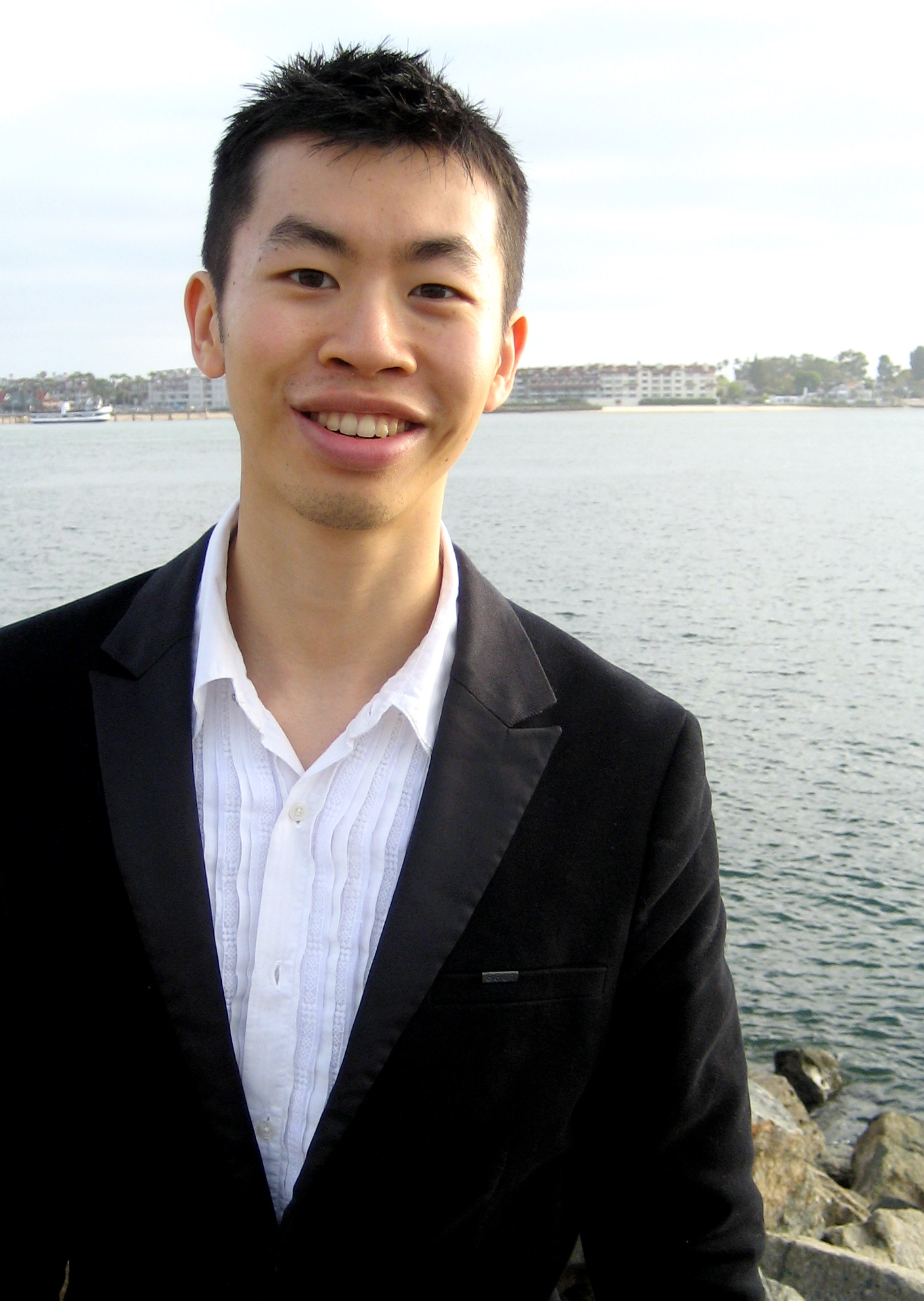
- Martin Leung, the Video Game Pianist, in San Diego, CA, 2009

Background information
- Also known as: Video Game Pianist
- Born: Martin Leung; Hong Kong
- Origin: Orange County, California, United States
- Genres: Video game music, classical music
- Occupation: Pianist
- Instrument: Piano
- Years active: 2004–present
- Website: videogamepianist.com

Martin Leung (/luːŋ/) is an American pianist. He plays classical music and is known as Video Game Pianist. He gained recognition for playing video game music on the piano, both in concert venues and in online videos.

In July 2004, a video of him playing the Super Mario Bros. theme blindfolded became viral. Leung makes YouTube videos, and as of November 2026, has approximately 103,000 subscribers and over 27.8 million total views.

== Personal life ==
Born in Hong Kong to Chinese and Japanese parents, Leung moved to California when he was three years old. After being noticed imitating his sister playing, he was enrolled in piano lessons at the age of 4.

Leung placed first twice at the Los Angeles International Liszt Competition, once in 1998 and once in 2000, and placed third at the Eighth Annual Oberlin International Piano Competition in 2002. He made his Carnegie Hall debut in 2003 at the age of 16 in the Isaac Stern Auditorium, performing Mendelssohn's Concerto No. 1 - Presto. In August 2003, Leung performed the same movement with the Pittsburgh Symphony Orchestra with conductor Lucas Richman in Heinz Hall. The performance was later broadcast on the NPR radio show From The Top.

On 2 July 2004, the video he and a friend had created of him performing songs from the Super Mario Bros. series blindfolded debuted on eBaum's World and later appeared on other websites.

Leung holds piano performance degrees from USC Thornton School of Music (Doctor of Musical Arts, 2015, Prof. Stewart L. Gordon), Yale School of Music (Master of Music, 2010, Prof. Claude Frank), and Cleveland Institute of Music (Bachelor of Music, 2008, Prof. Paul Schenly and Prof. Daniel Shapiro). Leung studied with Marilyn Shields, Scott McBride Smith, Myong-joo Lee, and Ory Shihor before studying at the Cleveland Institute of Music.

== Performances ==
=== Video game music ===
After getting 40 million views on his Super Mario Medley internet video, he began performing video game music from other popular gaming series including The Legend of Zelda, Sonic the Hedgehog, Halo, Earthworm Jim, and Final Fantasy. Leung performed in select cities with Video Games Live from 2005 to 2012. His performances were reviewed and mentioned in the New York Times, Wired, Deseret News, G4TV, San Diego Union Tribune, the Boston Phoenix, among others.

Leung gave his first live all-video-game-music piano recital at the Alamo Drafthouse Cinema in Austin, TX in 2005. Leung gave 21 encores. He was also featured in NPR’s song of the day for the recording of "Mario Solo Piano Medley" for Video Games Live album.

In March 2007, at the Game Audio Network Guild Awards, Leung performed Super Mario music with Koji Kondo and Shigeru Miyamoto in attendance.

Leung has been featured in The Plain Dealer, National Public Radio, Steinway & Sons – Owners' Magazine, Nintendo Power, Slashdot, GAME Magazine, CUBE Magazine, Night Life Montreal, MTV, 1UP.com, GameSpot, and Advanced Media Network.

=== Classical music ===
Leung has given over a hundred solo classical music public performances. Some notable performances the grand opening of Cammilleri Hall at the University of Southern California in 2012, Steinway Hall as part of the Yale Pianists at Steinway Hall series in 2009, Sprague Hall as part of the Messiaen Centenary Celebration at Yale in 2008, at the grand opening of Mixon Hall in 2007, and more.

He made his Carnegie Hall debut in 2003 at the age of 16 in the Isaac Stern Auditorium, performing Mendelssohn's Concerto No. 1 – Presto with the University High School Symphony/Peter Fournier. Leung has also performed with the USC Symphony/Carl St. Clair, Sudbury Symphony Orchestra/Victor Sawa, Regina Symphony Orchestra/Victor Sawa, Saskatoon Symphony Orchestra/Victor Sawa, Cleveland Institute of Music Orchestra/Tito Munoz, Pittsburgh Symphony/Lucas Richman, YMF Debut Orchestra/Frank Fetta, Brentwood-Westwood Symphony/Alvin Mills, Symphony in the Glen/Arthur B. Rubinstein and Delores Stevens, and the Southwestern Youth Music Festival Orchestra/Frances Steiner.

Leung has performed chamber music at Schoenfeld Symphonic Hall in 2013, at Sprague Hall for the New Music New Haven series in 2010, at Smith Hall as part of the Junior Chamber Music Series in 2004, and at the Chamber Music Showcase, organized by the National Foundation for Advancement in the Arts at the University of Miami in 2004. While at Yale, Leung performed in clarinet, violin, horn, and oboe recitals in 2009-2010.

In 2009, as part of the Yale Philharmonia, Leung played the keyboard glockenspiel in Mozart's "The Magic Flute." In 2009, Leung played the harpsichord at the Whitney Humanities Center. Martin Leung has been a recipient of several music awards including first prize at the Cleveland Concerto Competition (2007), the Art of the Piano Liszt Competition in Cincinnati (2011), the USC Concerto Competition (2013), Zoltán Rozsnyai Memorial Prize at the LA International Liszt Competition, Division VII (2016).
