= Excalibur BBS =

- Developer(s): Excalibur Communications
- Initial release: 1993
- Written in: Borland C++
- Operating system: Microsoft Windows
- Platform: x86

Excalibur BBS was a Windows-based GUI BBS software developed by Excalibur Communications. it was released in 1993, but it has not been supported since 1999 when Excalibur Communications ceased operations.

== Client Software ==
Users connected to the BBS by modem or over a TCP/IP connection with the Excalibur Client. For its time, the client provided a rich graphical environment allowing users access to instant messaging, games, music, message boards, and web-like hyperlinked navigation screens. Excalibur provided the platform for add-on functions called plugins.

These plugins included games with/without animation/sound and expanded functions for file searches, local and Internet e-mail, Fido net, Who's on, chat, changing handle/password, editing your account info, etc. Some systems used WAV files for background music incorporating a "jukebox" like interface with multiple music choices. Others used very clever screen changes to provide different degrees of visual input.

Due to programming limitations, Excalibur BBS does not work properly on Windows XP or newer.

The original program was written in Borland C++ by Tim Robinson.
