= Emmanuel Fratianni =

- Origin: Montreux, Switzerland
- Genres: Video Game Music, Jazz, Film music
- Occupations: Conductor, Composer
- Instrument: Piano

Emmanuel Fratianni is a Swiss conductor, composer and jazz pianist who has worked on film, television, and video games. Since 2010 Fratianni has been the principal conductor of the Video Games Live concert series.

== Early life ==
Playing piano at the age of six, Fratianni began his classical music studies upon acceptance to the Montreux Conservatory, in his hometown. As a teen, he discovered the jazz of Oscar Peterson, Bill Evans, Herbie Hancock and began performing publicly at age 14. By his late teens, Emmanuel's jazz quartet was to debut on the outer stages of the famed Montreux Jazz Festival. Fratianni studied with jazz educators Dick Grove, Lou Levy, Thierry Lang and pursued conducting studies in Los Angeles with Jack Feierman.

At the age of 28, Fratianni's concerto grosso September Suite, premiered at the Stravinsky Auditorium.

== Film music ==
Fratianni was awarded a visiting artist visa by the United States in 2000. He continued his training at UCLA in post graduate studies and privately with television composers Alf Clausen (The Simpsons), and Jay Chattaway (Star Trek).

He began working at the Paramount Music Library in 2003 as part of the score preparation team. He prepared the music and performed orchestration and score supervision for films and TV franchises over a span of 10 years, such as JAG, Stepford Wives, The Amazing Spider-Man and Avatar. He composed incidental music and underscoring licensed for a number of TV shows and programs including JAG, Breaking Bad and Dateline NBC.

== Video games ==
In 2005, Fratianni worked with Tommy Tallarico and Laurie Robinson to compose the music for the video game Advent Rising. In that same year, the music from the game was performed during the launch of the Video Games Live concert series at the Hollywood Bowl.

== Guest conductor ==
In 2010, Fratianni became the Principal Conductor of Video Games Live. Since then, Fratianni has guest conducted for San Francisco Symphony Orchestra, Baltimore Symphony Orchestra, National Symphony Orchestra, Houston Symphony Orchestra, Dallas Symphony Orchestra, Royal Scottish National Orchestra, Utah Symphony Orchestra, Indianapolis Symphony Orchestra, Nashville Symphony Orchestra, North Carolina Symphony Orchestra, Spanish National Symphony Orchestra, Beijing Opera and Performing Arts Orchestra and Chile National Symphony Orchestra as well as artist David Foster and Friends. In summer 2015 Fratianni was scheduled to make his debut guest conducting the Czech National Symphony Orchestra.

== Other work ==
In 2013, Fratianni and his partner, composer Laurie Robinson, were commissioned to create Portale, Symphony in an Airport, a symphonic poem to commemorate the grand opening of the Tom Bradley International Airport at Los Angeles International Airport. A neoclassical concerto grosso in 6 movements, the symphony was sponsored in part by Westfield Corporation, the City of Los Angeles, Ville de Lausanne and Canton de Vaud in Switzerland.

Fratianni is also co-founder of the Southern California Piano Academy, a Los Angeles music conservatory and pedagogical workshop for the development of music education for young people. Emmanuel's video game concert scores for school symphony, choir, wind ensemble and marching band, are published by Alfred Music Publishing in North America.
