= Diocese of Locri-Gerace =

Latin Catholic diocese in Italy

Coordinates: 38.2333°N 16.2667°E

Diocese of Locri-Gerace Dioecesis Locrensis-Hieracensis

Catholic
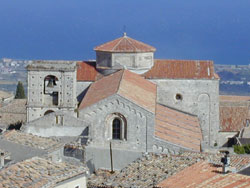
- Co-cathedral in Gerace

Location
- Country: Italy
- Ecclesiastical province: Reggio Calabria-Bova

Statistics
- Area: 1,248 km^{2} (482 sq mi)
- Population: Total; Catholics: (as of 2023); 118,617 ▼; 108,208 ▲
- Parishes: 73

Information
- Denomination: Catholic Church
- Sui iuris church: Latin Church
- Rite: Roman Rite
- Established: 5th century
- Cathedral: Cattedrale di S. Maria del Mastro (Locri)
- Co-cathedral: Concattedrale di S. Maria Assunta (Gerace)
- Secular priests: 51 (diocesan) ▲20 (Religious Orders) ▲9 Permanent Deacons

Current leadership
- Pope: Leo XIV
- Bishop: Cesare Di Pietro
- Metropolitan Archbishop: Fortunato Morrone
- Bishops emeritus: Francesco Oliva

Map

Website
- www.diocesilocri.it

The Diocese of Locri-Gerace (Latin: Dioecesis Locrensis-Hieracensis) is a Latin diocese of the Catholic Church in Calabria. It is a suffragan of the Archdiocese of Reggio Calabria-Bova.

Historically it was the Diocese of Gerace, becoming in 1954 the Diocese of Gerace-Locri and taking the current name in 1986.

== History ==
Gerace probably owes its origin, or at least its importance, to the ruin of the town of Epizephyrian Locris, one of the earliest Greek colonies in Lower Italy, founded by the Ozolian Locrians (684–680 B.C.) and endowed with a code of laws by Zaleucus. The town was in a favorable position for the exploitation of the rich fields along the coast of the Gulf of Taranto, and sharing in the commerce of the east-west trade route. Locri, however, was a beachfront town, wide-open to attacks by pirates and then by Arabs, Moors, and Saracens. Before its total ruin, Locri Epizephrii had a bishop of its own; but in 709, under Bishop Gregory, the see was transferred to Gerace. Gerace had the advantage of being a fortifiable hilltop, where the population could protect itself from raiders. There was only one bishop and one diocese, however, first called Locri and then called Gerace. These were not two dioceses.

In 731, Gerace and all the towns of Calabria suffered from a major earthquake, which devastated many of the cities of the region. There was another major earthquake in 1783, and one in 1908.

The church of Saint Cyriaca was destroyed by the Saracens in 915. They captured the town in 986, but in 1059 it fell into the hands of the Normans. The Normans began the turn away from Greek affiliations toward Rome, aided by the policies of Gregory VII and Urban II.

Until 1467 the Greek Rite was in wide use at Gerace, and such had probably been the custom from the beginning. As early as the thirteenth century efforts were made to introduce the Latin Rite, which accounts for the schism between Latins and Greeks about 1250–1253. The latter demanded as bishop the monk Bartenulfo, a Greek, whereas Pope Innocent IV, in 1253, appointed Marco Leone. In 1467, bishop Atanasio Calceofilo introduced the Latin Rite.

In 1749 Gerace was a town whose population was estimated at 3,000. It was divided ecclesiastically into thirteen parishes. There were forty-five ecclesiastical parishes in the diocese. In 1890 the population of the diocese was given as 106,335, and the number of parishes was seventy one; there were 393 priests. The Chapter of the Cathedral had eight dignities and sixteen Canons. Among the dignities were: the Cantor, the Archdeacon, the Archpriest, the Primicerius, the Dean, the Protonotary, the Treasurer, and the Master of Ceremonies The seminary of the diocese was founded by Bishop Candido, in obedience to the decrees of the Council of Trent, and completed by his successor Bishop Pasqua.

The population of the town of Gerace in 2012 was 2,715. The population of the town of Locri was 12,845 in 2010.

== Bishops ==
=== Diocese of Gerace ===
Latin Name: Hieracensis
Erected: 5th Century

==== to 1300 ====
...

- [Basilius (attested 451)]
- Dulcinus
- Marcianus (attested 597, 598, 599)
- Crescens (649)
- Stephanus (attested 679)
- Christopher (attested 687)

...

- Georgius (attested 869)

...

- Leontius (attested 1100)

...

- Constantinus (attested January 1179 – March 1179)
- Leo (attested December 1194)

...

- Nipho (attested 1211)
- Nicolaus (1219 – 1225/1226)

...

- Barsanufius, O.S.Basil. (December 1250 – 18 October 1254)
- Leo (18 October 1254 – 8 July 1255)
- Paulus, O.S.Basil. (9 August 1262 – 29 July 1280)
- Jacobus
- Barlaam, O.S.Basil.

...

==== 1300 to 1600 ====
- Barlaam II (2 October 1342 – 1347)
- Simon Atumano (June 1348 – 17 April 1366)
- Nicolaus Mele (3 August 1366 – 1382)
- Jacobus (1382 – 2 June 1400)
- Angelo del Tufo (5 July 1400 – 7 May 1419)
- Paulus (12 June 1419 – 4 February 1429)
- Aimericus (1429 – 1444)
- Gregorius Diositani (10 July 1444 – 3 August 1461)
- Athanasius Calceofilo (21 Oct 1461 – 4 Nov 1497 Died)
- Troilus Carafa (27 November 1497 – 1504?)
- Jaime de Conchillos, O. de M. (23 Feb 1505 – 25 Feb 1509)
- Bandinello Sauli (1509 – 19 Nov 1517 Resigned)
- Francesco Armellini Pantalassi de' Medici (19 Nov 1517 – 6 Jun 1519 Resigned)
- Alessandro Cesarini (Sr.) (6 Jun 1519 – 15 Jun 1519 Resigned)
- Girolamo Planca (15 Jun 1519 – 21 Aug 1534 Died)
- Alessandro Cesarini (Sr.) (21 Aug 1534 – 20 Feb 1538 Resigned)
- Tiberio Muti (20 Feb 1538 – 9 Mar 1552)
- Giovanni Andrea Candido, O.S.Io.Hieros. (19 Mar 1552 – 6 Sep 1574 Died)
- Ottaviano Pasqua (17 Sep 1574 – 8 Jan 1591 Died)
- Vincenzo Bonardo, O.P. (20 Mar 1591 – 11 Mar 1601 Died)

==== 1600 to 1920 ====
- Orazio Mattei (19 Nov 1601 – 13 Jun 1622 Died)
- Alessandro Boschi (8 Aug 1622 – 29 Jan 1624 Resigned)
- Stefano de Rosis (29 Jan 1624 – 15 Aug 1624 Died)
- Giovanni Maria Belletti (27 Jan 1625 – 25 Feb 1626 Died)
- Lorenzo Tramallo (16 Sep 1626 – 8 Oct 1649 Died)
- Michele Angelo Vincentini (2 May 1650 – 20 Dec 1670 Resigned)
- Stefano Sculco (22 Dec 1670 – 20 Apr 1686 Resigned)
- Tommaso Caracciolo, O.S.B. (28 Apr 1687 – 31 Mar 1689 Died)
- Domenico Diez de Aux (7 Nov 1689 – 5 Nov 1729 Died)
- Ildefonso del Tufo, O.S.B. (8 Feb 1730 – 7 May 1748 Resigned)
- Domenico Bozzoni (3 Mar 1749 – 21 Dec 1749 Died)
- Cesare Rossi (23 Feb 1750 – 14 Nov 1755 Died)
- Pietro Domenico Scoppa (5 Apr 1756 – 14 Nov 1793)

Sede vacante (1793–1797)

- Vincenzo Barisani, O.S.A. (18 Dec 1797 – 4 Feb 1806)
- Giuseppe Maria Pellicano (21 Dec 1818 – 19 Jun 1833 Died)
- Luigi Maria Perrone, C.O. (19 Dec 1834 – 14 Mar 1852 Died)
- Pasquale de Lucia (27 Sep 1852 – 11 Jun 1860 Died)
- Francesco Saverio Mangeruva (6 May 1872 – 11 May 1905 Died)
- Giorgio Francesco Delrio (6 Dec 1906 – 16 Dec 1920 Appointed, Archbishop of Oristano)

=== Diocese of Gerace (-Santa Maria di Polsi) ===
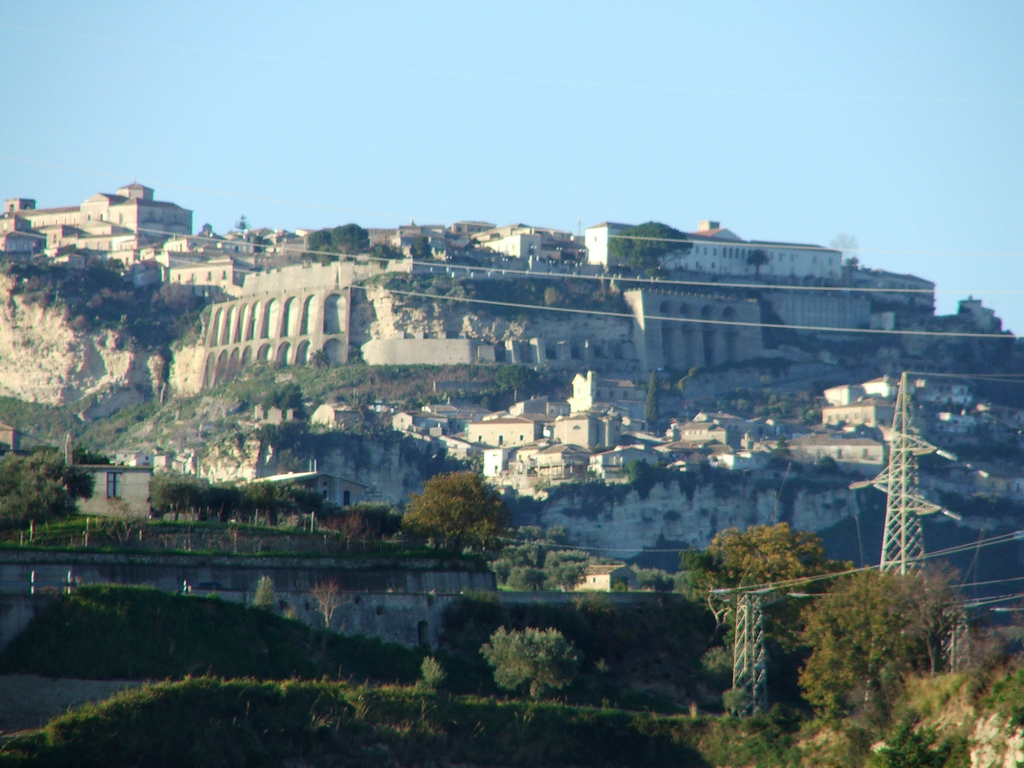
Gerace, the Cathedral at left

Latin Name: Hieracensis (-Sanctae Mariae de Pulsi)
Name Changed: 8 April 1920
Metropolitan: Archdiocese of Reggio Calabria

- Giovanni Battista Chiappe (4 Oct 1922 – 26 Aug 1951 Died)
- Pacifico Maria Luigi Perantoni, O.F.M. (31 Jan 1952 – 21 Aug 1962 Appointed, Archbishop of Lanciano e Ortona)

=== Diocese of Gerace-Locri (-Santa Maria di Polsi) ===
Latin Name: Hieracensis-Locrensis (-Sanctae Mariae de Pulsi)
Name Changed: 22 February 1954
Metropolitan: Archdiocese of Reggio Calabria

- Michele Alberto Arduino, S.D.B. (21 Oct 1962 – 18 Jun 1972 Died)
- Francesco Tortora, O.M. (21 Oct 1972 – 22 Sep 1988 Resigned)

=== Diocese of Locri-Gerace (-Santa Maria di Polsi) ===
Latin Name: Dioecesis Locrensis-Hieracensis (-Sanctae Mariae de Pulsi)
Name Changed: 30 September 1986
Metropolitan: Archdiocese of Reggio Calabria-Bova

- Antonio Ciliberti (7 Dec 1988 – 6 May 1993 Appointed, Archbishop of Matera-Irsina)
- Giancarlo Maria Bregantini, C.S.S. (12 Feb 1994 – 8 Nov 2007 Appointed, Archbishop of Campobasso-Boiano)
- Giuseppe Fiorini Morosini, O.M. (20 Mar 2008 – 13 Jul 2013 Appointed, Archbishop of Reggio Calabria-Bova)
- Francesco Oliva (5 May 2014 – 23 May 2026 Retired)
- Cesare Di Pietro (23 May 2026 – Present)

== Bibliography ==
=== Reference works ===
- Gams, Pius Bonifatius (1873). Series episcoporum Ecclesiae catholicae: quotquot innotuerunt a beato Petro apostolo. Ratisbon: Typis et Sumptibus Georgii Josephi Manz. p. 882–883. (Use with caution; obsolete)
- Eubel, Conradus, ed. (1913). Hierarchia catholica, Tomus 1 (second ed.). Münster: Libreria Regensbergiana. p. 263. (in Latin)
- Eubel, Conradus, ed. (1914). Hierarchia catholica, Tomus 2 (second ed.). Münster: Libreria Regensbergiana. p. 159.
- Eubel, Conradus; Gulik, Guilelmus (1923). Hierarchia catholica, Tomus 3 (second ed.). Münster: Libreria Regensbergiana. pp. 209.
- Gauchat, Patritius (Patrice) (1935). Hierarchia catholica IV (1592-1667). Münster: Libraria Regensbergiana. p. 202.
- Ritzler, Remigius; Sefrin, Pirminus (1952). Hierarchia catholica medii et recentis aevi V (1667-1730). Patavii: Messagero di S. Antonio. p. 219.
- Ritzler, Remigius; Sefrin, Pirminus (1958). Hierarchia catholica medii et recentis aevi VI (1730-1799). Patavii: Messagero di S. Antonio. p. 235.
- Ritzler, Remigius; Sefrin, Pirminus (1968). Hierarchia Catholica medii et recentioris aevi sive summorum pontificum, S. R. E. cardinalium, ecclesiarum antistitum series... A pontificatu Pii PP. VII (1800) usque ad pontificatum Gregorii PP. XVI (1846) (in Latin). Vol. VII. Monasterii: Libr. Regensburgiana.
- Ritzler, Remigius; Pirminus Sefrin (1978). Hierarchia catholica Medii et recentioris aevi... A Pontificatu PII PP. IX (1846) usque ad Pontificatum Leonis PP. XIII (1903) (in Latin). Vol. VIII. Il Messaggero di S. Antonio.
- Pięta, Zenon (2002). Hierarchia catholica medii et recentioris aevi... A pontificatu Pii PP. X (1903) usque ad pontificatum Benedictii PP. XV (1922) (in Latin). Vol. IX. Padua: Messagero di San Antonio. ISBN 978-88-250-1000-8.

=== Studies ===
- Avino, Vincenzio d' (1848). Cenni storici sulle chiese arcivescovili, vescovili, e prelatizie (nullius) del regno delle due Sicilie (in Italian). Naples: dalle stampe di Ranucci. pp. 511–515.
- Cappelletti, Giuseppe (1870). Le chiese d'Italia: dalla loro origine sino ai nostri giorni (in Italian). Vol. vigesimo primo (21). Venezia: G. Antonelli. pp. 165–171.
- D'Agostino, Enzo (2004). Da Locri a Gerace: storia di una diocesi della Calabria bizantina dalle origini al 1480 (in Italian). Soveria Mannelli (Catanzaro): Rubbettino Editore. ISBN 978-88-498-1158-2.
- Gemelli, S. (ed.) (1986). La Cattedrale di Gerace. Il monumento, la funzione, I corredi. Carical, Cosenza.
- Kamp, Norbert (1975). Kirche und Monarchie im staufischen Königreich Sizilien: I. Prosopographische Grundlegung, Bistumer und Bistümer und Bischöfe des Konigreichs 1194–1266: 2. Apulien und Calabrien München: Wilhelm Fink 1975.
- Kehr, Paulus Fridolin (1975). Italia pontificia. Regesta pontificum Romanorum. Vol. X: Calabria–Insulae. Berlin: Weidmann. (in Latin)
- Lanzoni, Francesco (1927). Le diocesi d'Italia dalle origini al principio del secolo VII (an. 604) (in Italian). Rome: Biblioteca Apostolica Vaticana.
- Lobstein, Franz von; Sorge, Giuseppe (1977). Bollari dei vescovi di Gerace (in Italian). Chiaravalle Centrale: Edizioni effe emme.
- Russo, Francesco (1982). Storia della Chiesa in Calabria dalle origini al Concilio di Trento, 2 vols. Rubbetino: Soveria Mannelli 1982.
- Scaglione, Pasquale (1856). Storie di Locri e Gerace. Vol. Parte seconda. Naples: G. Nobile.
- Taccone-Gallucci, Domenico (1902). Regesti dei Romani pontefici della Calabria (in Italian). Rome: Tip. Vaticana. p. 402.
- Ughelli, Ferdinando; Coleti, Niccolo (1721). Italia Sacra Sive De Episcopis Italiae, Et Insularum adiacentium (in Latin). Vol. Tomus nonus (9). Venice: Antonio Coleti. pp. 393–399.
- Synodus dioecesana ab illustriss. et reverendiss d.d. Vincentio Vincentino ... celebrata in cathedrali ecclesia 9. kal. maij 1651. Messana: typis haeredum Petri Breae. 1651. pp. 169–173. (contains a list of bishops)
