= Roman Catholic Diocese of Lacedonia =

The Italian Catholic diocese of Lacedonia (Laquedonia, Cedonia), a suffragan of the archdiocese of Benevento in Campania, existed until 1986 when incorporated into the reorganized Roman Catholic Diocese of Ariano Irpino-Lacedonia.

== History ==
The bishop of Lacedonia had his episcopal throne in the cathedral of Lacedonia, which was dedicated to the carrying up (Assumption) of the body of the Virgin Mary into heaven. The old cathedral dated from the eleventh century.

The cathedral was administered and served by a Chapter, which consisted of five dignities and seven Canons. The dignities were: the Archdeacon, the Archpriest, the Primicerius, and the Treasurer. Two of the other Canons were appointed the Theologus and the Penitentiary.

The diocese was from its founding a suffragan of the Conza.

The first known bishop is Desiderius, mentioned in 1082, but he is known to have had predecessors.

In the great earthquake of 1456, the town of Lacedonia was completely ruined and abandoned. Recovery was assisted by the Prince of Taranto, Gianantonio Orsini. But, by 1625, there were only about 300 families living in Lacedonia. In 1744, there were still only 1,200 inhabitants.

In 1818, in consideration of the Concordat reached between the Holy See (Vatican) and the Kingdom of the Two Sicilies, the territory of the Diocese of Lacedonia was increased by the suppression of the diocese of Trevico, a neighbouring diocese subject to the Metropolitan of Benevento.

Lacedonia suffered much from earthquakes, especially in 1694 and 1702. In 1694, one third of the houses were destroyed, and the rest were damaged. One person was killed.

== Bishops of Lacedonia ==
=== to 1500 ===
...

- Desiderius (attested 1082–1085)
- Hyacinthus (Iaquintus) (attested 1108)

...

- Angelus (attested 1179)

...

- Guillelmus (attested 1212–1221)
- Antonius (attested 1255)
- Rogerius Centumficus de Sancta Sofia (attested 1275)

Sede vacante (1266–1272)
...

- Daniel (attested 1290–1304)

...

- Nicolaus (attested 1321–1345)
- Franciscus de Marziis, O.Min. (1345–1352)
- Paulus de Interamna, O.Min. (1352–1385)
- Antonius (1386–1392)
- Guglielmo da Nardo, O.Min. (1392-1396)
- Joannes de Nerone, O.Min. (1396–1399)
- Giacomo de Marzia (1399–1401)
- Adinulfus (1401–1418)
- Hyacinthus (Jaquintus) (1417–1424)
- Nicolaus (1424–1428)
- Antonius di Cozza (1428–1430)
- Joannes (1430–1452)
- Giacomo de Cavallina (1452–1463)
- Petruccio de Migliolo (30 Jan 1463 – 1481 Died)
- Giovanni dei Porcari (27 Aug 1481 – 1486 Died)
- Niccolò de Rubini (2 Jun 1486 – 8 Aug 1505 Died)

=== from 1500 to 1800 ===
- Antonio Dura (1506–1538 Resigned)

Cardinal Antonio Sanseverino (1538) Administrator

- Scipione Dura (1538–1551) Administrator
- Fabio Capelleto (1551–1565 Resigned)
- Gianfranco Carducci (1565–1584)
- Marco Pedacca, O.S.B. (1584–1602)
- Gian Paolo Palenteri, O.F.M. Conv. (27 Nov 1602 – 1606)
- Giacomo Candido (bishop) (13 Nov 1606 – Aug 1608)
- Gian Gerolamo Campanili (24 Dec 1608 –1625)
- Ferdinando Bruno, O.F.M. (6 Oct 1625 – 1648)
- Gian Giacomo Cristoforo (12 Apr 1649 – 8 May 1649)
- Ambrosio Viola, O.P. (11 Oct 1649 – 1651)
- Giacomo Giordano, O.S.B. (28 Oct 1651 – 9 Nov 1661)
- Pier Antonio Capobianco (12 Mar 1663 – 9 Sep 1672 Resigned)
- Benedetto Bartolo (1672–1684)
- Giambattista Morea (1684–1711)

Sede vacante (1711–1718)

- Gennaro Scalea (1718–1736)
- Claudio Domenico Albini (27 Feb 1736 – 25 Jul 1744)
- Tommaso Aceti (Aoeti) (7 Sep 1744 – 8 Apr 1749)
- Nicolò de Amato (21 Jul 1749 – 31 Aug 1789)

Sede vacante (1789–1798)

=== since 1798 ===
- Francesco Ubaldo Maria Romanzi (1798–1816)

Sede vacante (1816–1819)

- Vincenzo Ferrari, O.P. (4 Jun 1819 –1824)
- Desiderio Mennone, C.SS.R. (24 May 1824 – 11 Apr 1825)

Sede vacante (1825–1828)

- Giuseppe Maria Botticelli, O.F.M. (23 Jun 1828 – 25 Oct 1832)
- Michele Lanzetta (20 Jan 1834 – 25 Apr 1842)
- Luigi Giamporcaro (1843–1844)
- Luigi Napolitano (20 Jan 1845 – 26 Nov 1857 Died)
- Francesco Antonio Maiorsini (1859–1871)
- Benedetto Augusto (22 Dec 1871 Appointed – )
- Pietro Alfonso Jorio (Iorio) (27 Feb 1880 – 27 Mar 1885 Appointed, Archbishop of Taranto)
- Giovanni Maria Diamare (27 Mar 1885 – 1 Jun 1888 Appointed, Bishop of Sessa Aurunca)
- Francesco Niola (1 Jun 1888 – 14 Dec 1891 Appointed, Archbishop of Gaeta)
- Diomede Angelo Raffaele Gennaro Falconio, O.F.M. (11 Jul 1892 – 29 Nov 1895 Appointed, Archbishop of Acerenza e Matera)
- Nicolo Zimarino (29 Nov 1895 – 6 Dec 1906 Appointed, Bishop of Gravina e Irsina)
- Gaetano Pizzi (27 Aug 1907 – 5 Nov 1912 Appointed, Bishop of San Severo)
- Cosimo Agostino (28 Jul 1913 – 1 Jun 1915 Appointed, Bishop of Ariano)
- Francesco Maffei (22 May 1916 – 24 Jun 1926 Resigned)
- Giulio Tommasi (20 Jan 1928 – 15 Aug 1936 Died)
- Cristoforo Domenico Carullo, O.F.M. (2 Feb 1940 – 31 Jan 1968 Died)
- Agapito Simeoni (9 May 1974 – 2 Jan 1976 Died)
- Nicola Agnozzi, O.F.M. Conv. (24 Mar 1976 – 30 Sep 1986 Appointed, Bishop of Ariano Irpino-Lacedonia)

United: 30 September 1986 with the Diocese of Ariano to form the Diocese of Ariano Irpino-Lacedonia

== See also ==
- Roman Catholic Diocese of Ariano Irpino-Lacedonia

== Bibliography ==
=== Reference for bishops ===
- Gams, Pius Bonifatius (1873). Series episcoporum Ecclesiae catholicae: quotquot innotuerunt a beato Petro apostolo (in Latin). Ratisbon: Typis et Sumptibus Georgii Josephi Manz. pp. 887–888.
- Eubel, Conradus, ed. (1913). Hierarchia catholica (in Latin). Vol. Tomus 1 (second ed.). Münster: Libreria Regensbergiana.
- Eubel, Conradus, ed. (1914). Hierarchia catholica (in Latin). Vol. Tomus 2 (second ed.). Münster: Libreria Regensbergiana.
- Gulik, Guilelmus (1923). Eubel, Conradus (ed.). Hierarchia catholica (in Latin). Vol. Tomus 3 (second ed.). Münster: Libreria Regensbergiana.
- Gauchat, Patritius (Patrice) (1935). Hierarchia catholica (in Latin). Vol. Tomus IV (1592-1667). Münster: Libraria Regensbergiana.
- Ritzler, Remigius; Sefrin, Pirminus (1952). Hierarchia catholica medii et recentis aevi V (1667-1730). Patavii: Messagero di S. Antonio.
- Ritzler, Remigius; Sefrin, Pirminus (1958). Hierarchia catholica medii et recentis aevi (in Latin). Vol. Tomus VI (1730-1799). Patavii: Messagero di S. Antonio.
- Ritzler, Remigius; Sefrin, Pirminus (1968). Hierarchia Catholica medii et recentioris aevi sive summorum pontificum, S. R. E. cardinalium, ecclesiarum antistitum series... A pontificatu Pii PP. VII (1800) usque ad pontificatum Gregorii PP. XVI (1846) (in Latin). Vol. VII. Monasterii: Libr. Regensburgiana.
- Remigius Ritzler; Pirminus Sefrin (1978). Hierarchia catholica Medii et recentioris aevi... A Pontificatu PII PP. IX (1846) usque ad Pontificatum Leonis PP. XIII (1903) (in Latin). Vol. VIII. Il Messaggero di S. Antonio.
- Pięta, Zenon (2002). Hierarchia catholica medii et recentioris aevi... A pontificatu Pii PP. X (1903) usque ad pontificatum Benedictii PP. XV (1922) (in Latin). Vol. IX. Padua: Messagero di San Antonio. ISBN 978-88-250-1000-8.

=== Studies ===
- Cappelletti, Giuseppe (1866). Le chiese d'Italia: dalla loro origine sino ai nostri giorni : opera (in Italian). Vol. vigesimo (20). Venice: G. Antonelli. pp. 560–565, 570.
- Kamp, Norbert (1975). Kirche und Monarchie im staufischen Königreich Sizilien: I. Prosopographische Grundlegung, Bistumer und Bistümer und Bischöfe des Konigreichs 1194–1266: 2. Apulien und Calabrien München: Wilhelm Fink 1975.
- Libertazzi, Giovanni G. (1986). La diocesi di Lacedonia nell'età moderna (in Italian). Venosa: Osanna. ISBN 9788881670734.
- Mattei-Cerasoli, Leone (1919). "Da archivii e biblioteche: Di alcuni vescovi poco noti". (in Italian). In: Archivio storico per le province Neapolitane 44 (Napoli: Luigi Lubrano 1919). pp. 310-335.
- Palmese, Pasquale (1848), "Lacedonia," in: Vincenzo D'Avino (1848). Cenni storici sulle chiese arcivescovili, vescovili, e prelatizie (nullius) del Regno delle Due Sicilie (in Italian). dalle stampe di Ranucci. pp. 284–286.
- Ughelli, Ferdinando; Coleti, Niccolo (1720). Italia sacra sive De episcopis Italiæ, et insularum adjacentium (in Latin). Vol. Tomus sextus (6). Venice: apud Sebastianum Coleti. pp. 838–843.
