= Lacedonia =

- Comune
- Comune di Lacedonia
- Location within Italy Location within Campania
- Coordinates: 41°3′8″N 15°25′29″E
- Country: Italy
- Region: Campania
- Province: Province of Avellino (AV)

Government
  - Mayor: Antonio Di Conza

Area
  - Total: 82.1 km^{2} (31.7 sq mi)
- Elevation: 732 m (2,402 ft)

Population (31 August 2017)
  - Total: 2,280
  - Density: 27.8/km^{2} (71.9/sq mi)
- Demonym: Lacedoniesi
- Time zone: UTC+1 (CET)
  - Summer (DST): UTC+2 (CEST)
- Postal code: 83046
- Dialing code: 0827
- Patron saint: St. Nicholas of Myra
- Saint day: 6 December
- Website: Official website

Lacedonia (Irpinian: Cerògne) is a comune in the province of Avellino, Campania region, southern Italy. The town is part of the Roman Catholic Diocese of Ariano Irpino.

== History ==
Lacedonia was first called Akudunniad by the Osci and then Erdonea. After many destructions, it was rebuilt by the Romans, with the name of Aquilonia, and was part of the Tribe of Galeria. It was later called Al Cidonia and then Cedogna until 1800. Finally it became Lacedonia.

In 517 AD it was given to the Benedictine monks by the Emperor Justinian.

It was under the Lombards, the Counts of Conza and the Normans, then became a fiefdom of the Balvano, Orsini, Pappacoda and Doria families.

Lacedonia is famous for the "conspiracy of the barons" of the Kingdom of Naples against King Ferdinand I of Naples, which took shape in the cathedral of Lacedonia in 1484.

Lacedonia has suffered much from earthquakes, especially in 1694 and 1702. In 1930 another violent earthquake destroyed the whole town; the population lived, temporarily, in earthquake-proof houses and only in 2001 were they able to move to more modern houses built after 1980 earthquake killed about 3000 people in southern Italy.

== See also ==
- Irpinia
- Roman Catholic Diocese of Lacedonia, former see at Lacedonia
