= Giacomelli =

Giacomelli (pronounced [dʒakoˈmɛlli]) is an Italian surname derived from the given name Giacomo (James). Notable people with the surname include:

- Bruno Giacomelli (born 1952), Italian race car driver
- Cesare de' Giacomelli (died 1577), Italian Catholic prelate
- Francesco Giacomelli (born 1957), Italian ski jumper
- Geminiano Giacomelli (1692–1740), Italian composer
- Giacomo de' Giacomelli (fl. 1542–1552), Italian Catholic prelate
- Giorgio Giacomelli (1930–2017), Italian diplomat
- Guido Giacomelli (born 1980), Italian ski mountaineer
- Hector Giacomelli (1822–1904), French watercolorist, engraver and illustrator
- Mario Giacomelli (1925–2000), Italian photographer
- Nella Giacomelli (1873–1949), Italian anarchist, teacher and journalist
- Raffaele Giacomelli (1878–1956), Italian aeronautical engineer
- Sophie Giacomelli (1779–1819), French painter and engraver
- Stefano Giacomelli (born 1990), Italian footballer
- Tommy Giacomelli (born 1974), Brazilian footballer

== See also ==
- 15567 Giacomelli (2000 GF53), a main-belt asteroid
- Giacomel
- Giacometti (surname)
- Giacomini (surname)
- Giacomellia, a genus of moths
- Archytas giacomellii, a species of fly
- Argyrargenta giacomellii, a species of moth
- Hypopta giacomelli, a species of moth
- Trichopodopsis giacomellii, a species of fly
