= D'Aquino family =

Italian noble family

d'Aquino
- Country: Kingdom of Sicily; Kingdom of Naples; Kingdom of the Two Sicilies; Kingdom of Italy
- Founded: 9th century
- Founder: Rodoaldo d'Aquino
- Titles: List: Queen of Sicily; Prince of the Holy Roman Empire; Prince of Castiglione Marittimo; Prince of Feroleto; Prince of Santo Mango; Prince of Pietralcina; Prince of Pescolamazza; Duke of Gaeta; Duke of Bisceglie; Duke of Nicastro; Marquess of Corato; Marquess of Pescara; Count of Acerra; Count of Belcastro; Count of Loreto Aprutino; Count of Martorano; Baron of Roccabascerana; Baron of Messinara and Plutino; Baron of Castiglione; Lord of Roccasecca; Lord of Marigliano; Lord of Ottaviano; Lord of Giugliano; Lord of Venere; Lord of Cosenza; Lord of Tropea; Lord of Sarno; Grandee of Spain; Patrizio Napoletano; Viceroy of Sicily (non-hereditary); Bailiff of Jerusalem (non-hereditary)
- Motto: Bene scripsisti de me Thoma (Latin for 'You have written well of me, Thomas')

The House of d'Aquino is one of the oldest and most influential families of the Italian nobility. It was one of the seven great houses of the Kingdom of Naples and included among its members the famous Saint Thomas Aquinas.

== History ==
Formerly known as "Sommucula," the d'Aquino family is of Lombard origin, holding the title of Count from the early Middle Ages. The lineage traces back to Rodoaldo, Gastald of Aquino, during the time of the Dukes of Benevento in the 9th century. During the 10th century, Maginulfo, Gastald of Aquino, established a stronghold in the Matese mountains, from which the lordship of Roccamandolfi emerged. Maginulfo is considered the namesake of the Mainolfi lineage of the family. The 10th century also saw the emergence of records attesting to their ownership of the d’Aquino castle in Roccasecca.

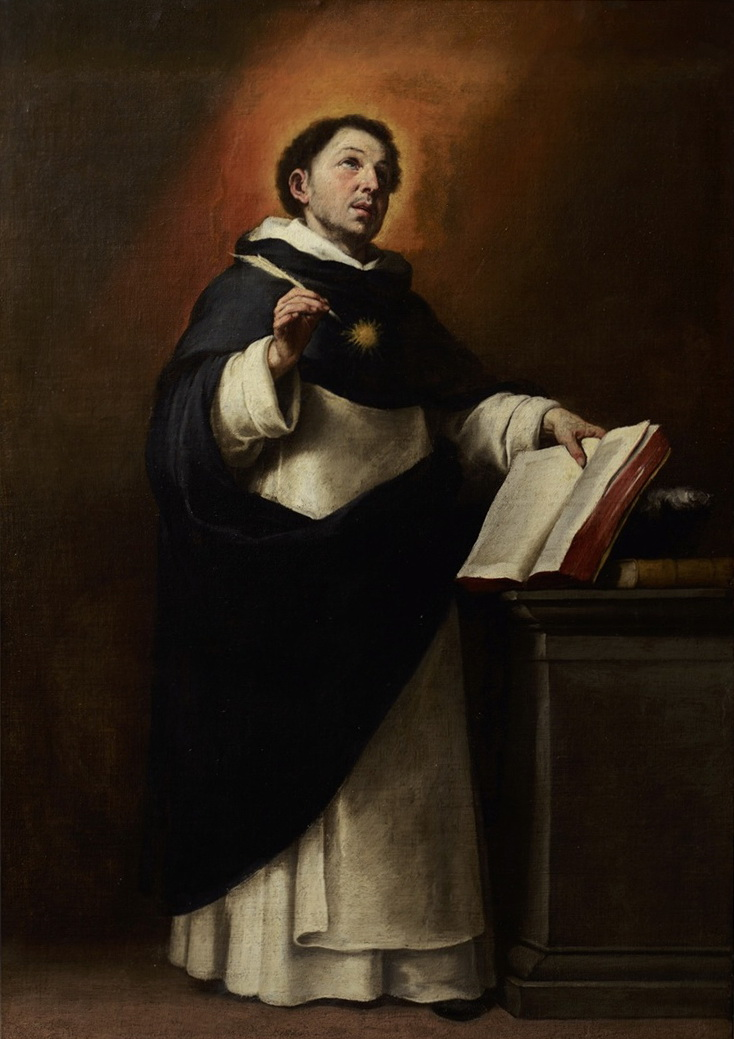
Saint Thomas Aquinas by Bartolomé Esteban Murillo, 1650

Around 970, sources mention an Adenolfo, Count of Aquino and Pontecorvo, a descendant of the Lombard Princes of Capua. The surname was already in use before the arrival of the Normans and before Otto III was crowned Emperor in Rome in 996. One member of the family, Thomas III, married the sister of King Manfred of Sicily, and another, Thomas, Prince of Castiglione, husband of Fulvia Pico of the Dukes of Mirandola, was created a Grandee of Spain by Charles II. Another Adenolfo acceded to the Duchy of Gaeta in 1038. The most famous figure of this lineage remains Saint Thomas Aquinas, Doctor of the Church, considered the spiritual father of the Church. As one of the seven great houses of the Kingdom of Naples, the family contributed significantly to the history of southern Italy with its great figures who held the highest civil, military, and ecclesiastical offices.

The Monte Cassino region was the first point of reference for the family, while the neighboring Principality of Capua was of comparable importance. Among the principal feudal lords of these territories, the d'Aquino distinguished themselves by their political and strategic skill, taking advantage of their geographical position and maneuvering skillfully between the balances of power in the north and south. Thus, they participated in the major conflicts of their time, notably the centuries-long struggle between the papacy and the Holy Roman Empire, and later the clashes between the Normans, the papacy, and the Swabians.

Among the members of the family active during the Norman period of southern Italy was Sibylla of Acerra, who became Queen of Sicily through her marriage to King Tancred, the illegitimate son of Roger III, Duke of Apulia. She was the daughter of Rainaldo d'Aquino, Lord of Roccasecca, and Cecilia of Medania. Her brother, Richard d'Aquino, Count of Acerra, was the chief peninsular supporter of his brother-in-law, King Tancred, during his claim to the throne in 1189.

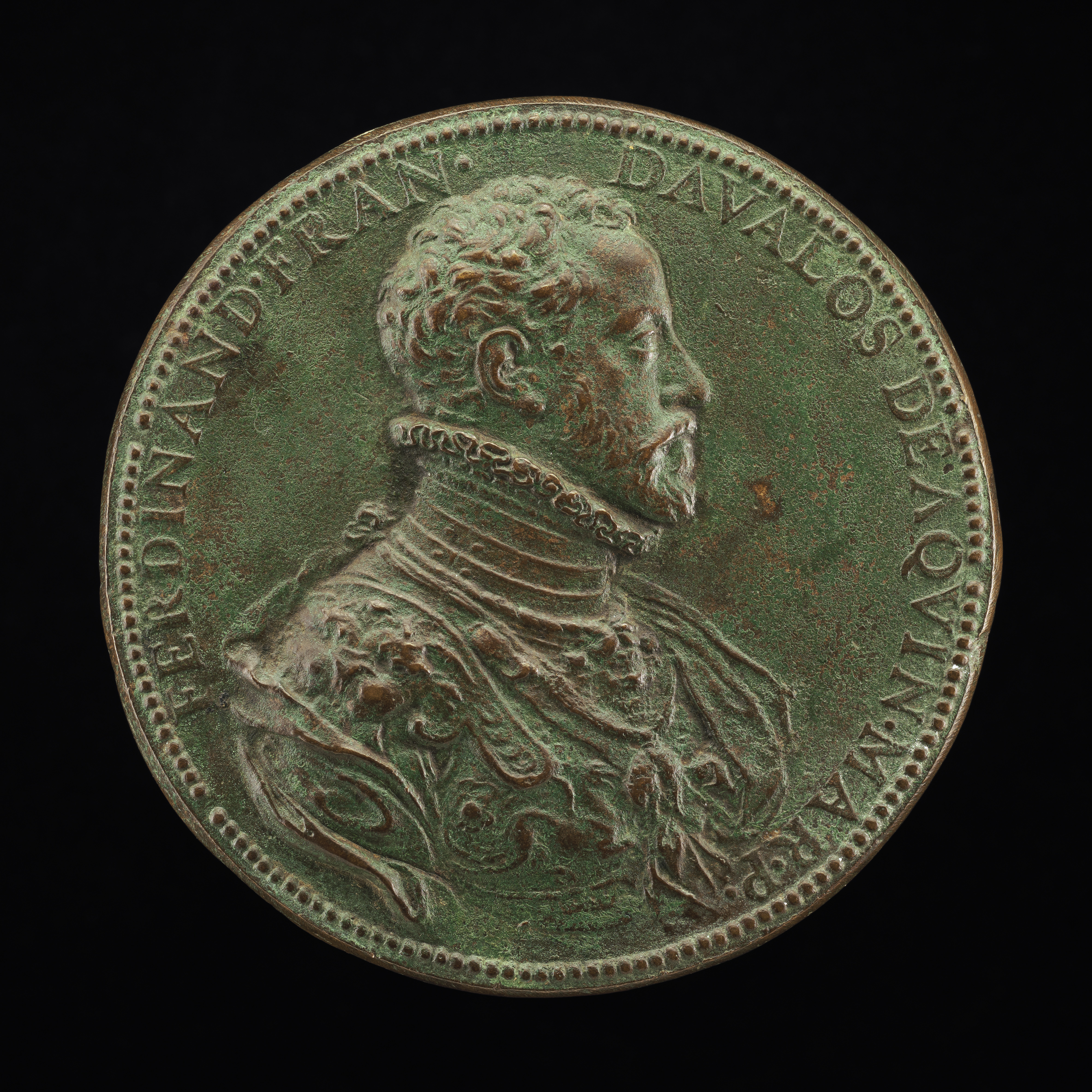
Fernando Francesco II d'Avalos d'Aquino, Marquess of Pescara, c. 1530–1571

Over the centuries, the lineage divided into several branches. The eldest branch died out with Francesco Antonio d'Aquino, son of Berardo Gaspare, Marquis of Pescara, and Beatrice Gaetani, daughter of Giacomo, Lord of Sermoneta. Francesco Antonio's heir was his sister Antonella d'Aquino, who brought as a dowry to her husband Innico I d'Avalos the titles of Marquis of Pescara and Count of Loreto. From this marriage seven children were born including Costanza d'Avalos, Alfonso II d'Avalos, and Innico II d'Avalos. Some descendants retained the name d'Aquino combined with that of d'Avalos, due to the prestige of the d'Aquino family. Members of the d'Avalos d'Aquino family intermarried with several prominent noble houses, including the Medici, Orsini, Colonna, Gonzaga, Doria, and Della Rovere. Moreover, a number of sovereigns descended from the family, including Maria Theresa of Austria-Este, Maria Luisa of Habsburg-Lorraine-Este, Maria Beatrice of Savoy, Francis II, Charles III, Robert I of Bourbon-Parma, Boris III of Bulgaria, and Jean of Luxembourg.

A cadet branch of the family, having as its founder Count Landolfo I (died around 1245), gave rise to the line of the Counts of Belcastro. A grandson of Landolfo, Tommaso I (son of Adenolfo), was made Lord of Belcastro in 1293, for which his son and heir Tommaso II obtained the title of Count. The last d'Aquino to bear the title of Count of Belcastro was the grandson of Tommaso II, Tommaso III called Tommasello, who died in 1375 without descendants. Among the younger sons of Landolfo I we also find the religious and theologian Saint Thomas Aquinas. Other descendants of Landolfo are attested up to the 17th century.

From another cadet branch of the family, originating with Andrea I, Lord of Grottaminarda, further cadet lines arose. This Andrea I was the second-born son of Landolfo I di Albeto and brother of Adenolfo II. Andrea I (died around 1210) became Lord of Grottaminarda and married Maria Gesualdo. One of his direct descendants, Ladislao II, was made Marquis of Corato in 1514 and Duke of Bisceglie in 1526. These titles were taken away from him in 1528 for his rebellion against Charles V and he was forced into exile with his firstborn son Antonio in France, where he died in the second half of the 16th century. Antonio d'Aquino married Isabella Caracciolo, daughter of Sergianni Caracciolo, II Prince of Melfi, and died in 1555. From this marriage three daughters were born: Claudia, married to Thibaut de Nogent; Margherita, married to Charles de Louviers; and Vittoria, married to Antoine de Cardaillac.

Another son of Ladislao II, Francesco, Baron of Roccabascerana (died in the first decade of the 17th century), married Beatrice di Guevara, daughter of Guevara, Lord of Savignano. One of the couple's children was Cardinal Ladislao d'Aquino. Francesco's heir was his son Ottavio, who was succeeded by his only son, Tommaso. This branch of the family died out in the male line with Tommaso's sixth son, the Theatine cleric Francesco Tommaso, who died in 1705 and had been Bishop of Sessa Aurunca since 1670. In the female line, the last descendant was Caterina, who married Marcello Lottieri, Prince of Pietrastornina. Her son Antonio obtained permission to add his mother's surname to his own, so that his descendants were called Lottieri d'Aquino.

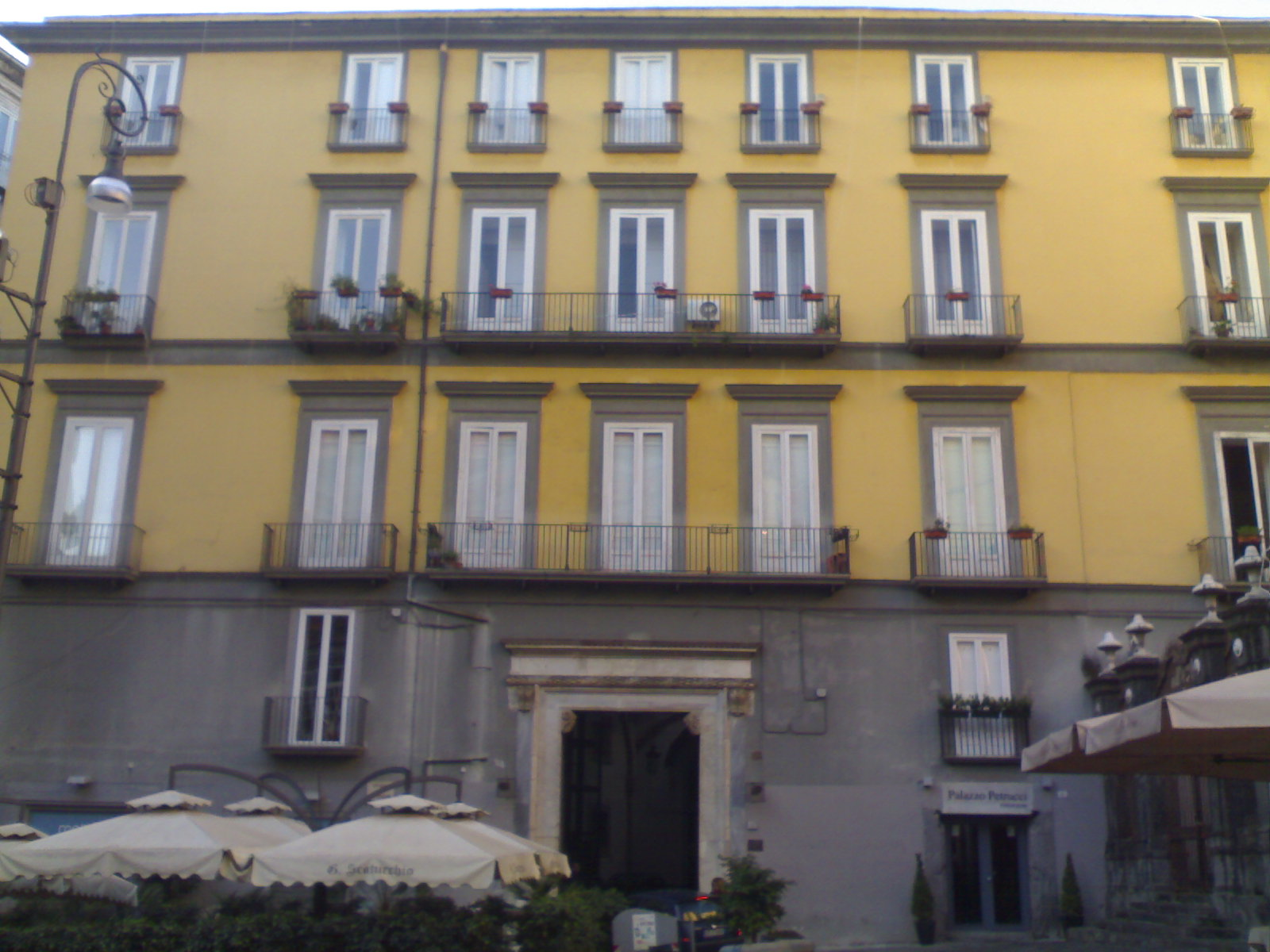
Naples Palace of the d'Aquino Princes of Castiglione until 1698

Another son of Andrea I, Adenolfo III, was the founder of three branches of the family that would arise during the 15th century. The first gave rise to the line of the Princes of Castiglione, descended from Louis II, who died in 1529. The second corresponds to the Patrician branch of Tropea, also known as that of the Barons of Messinara and Plutino, founded by Christopher II of Aquino, who died in the second half of the 15th century. Finally, the third branch, Patrician of Cosenza and Lord of Venere, originated with Christopher I, who died in the first half of the 15th century.

In 1894, a member of the d'Aquino branch of Tropea, Carolina d'Aquino, married Giuseppe Adilardi. During the Kingdom of Italy, the Adilardi d'Aquino family was registered in the Libro d'Oro della Nobiltà italiana, today preserved in the Central State Archives. The Tropea branch became extinct in the mid-20th century.

== Notable members ==
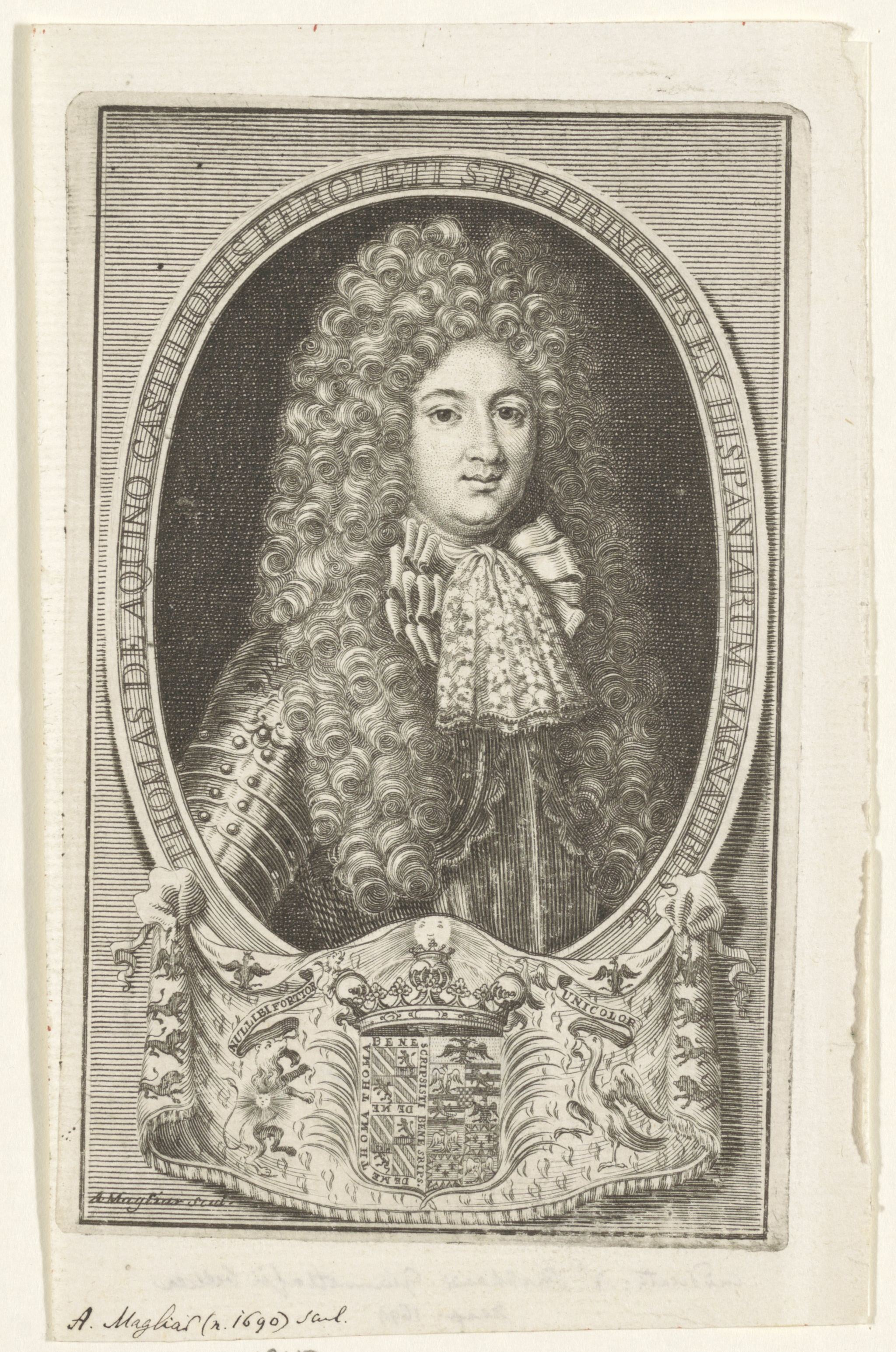
Tommaso d’Aquino, Prince of Castiglione, Santo Mango, and Feroleto, 1669–1721

- Adenolfo d'Aquino, Count of Aquino and Pontecorvo from 970.
- Adenolfo d'Aquino, Duke of Gaeta from 1038.
- Richard d'Aquino, also known as Richard d'Acerra, Count of Acerra, brother-in-law of Tancred (King of Sicily).
- Thomas I d'Aquinas, Count of Acerra, appointed by Emperor Frederick II as captain and Justiciar of Terra di Lavoro, Viceroy of the Kingdom of Sicily in 1232, then Podestà of Cremona. Thanks to his many journeys to the East, he learned to use gunpowder, which he imported in large quantities into Italy, thus changing the way wars were conducted.
- Thomas II d'Aquino, Count of Acerra and Loreto Aprutino and Lord of Marigliano, Ottaviano and Sarno, who married in 1247 Margaret of Swabia, natural daughter of Emperor Frederick II. Laslislas II, Duke of Bisceglie came from this union.
- Saint Thomas Aquinas, Doctor of the Church, spiritual father of the Church, one of the most important people of all periods.
- Marguerite d'Aquino, mistress of Robert I (King of Naples).
- Antonella d'Aquino, married Innico I d'Avalos in 1452. Hence d'Aquino d’Avalos.
- Lasdislao d'Aquino, Governor of Perugia, Bishop of Venafro, apostolic nuncio to Switzerland.
- Tommaso d’Aquino, Prince of Castiglione, Santo Mango, and Feroleto.
