= Prospero Santacroce =

Italian Roman Catholic bishop and cardinal

His Eminence Prospero Santacroce
- Cardinal-Bishop of Albano
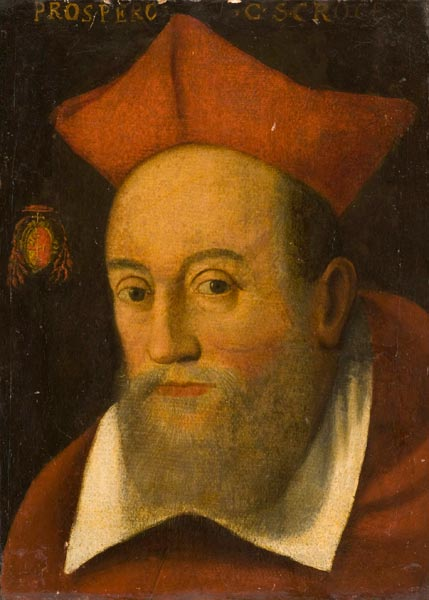
- Church: Catholic Church
- Appointed: 2 March 1589
- Term ended: 2 October 1589
- Predecessor: Tolomeo Gallio
- Successor: Gabriele Paleotti
- Previous posts: Apostolic Nuncio to France (1552–1556, 1561-1565); Apostolic Nuncio to Portugal (1560–1561); Cardinal-Priest of San Girolamo dei Croati (1566–1570); Cardinal-Priest of Sant'Adriano al Foro (1574–1583); Cardinal-Priest of San Clemente (1583–1589)

Orders
- Created cardinal: 12 March 1565 by Pope Pius IV
- Rank: Cardinal-Bishop

Personal details
- Born: 24 September 1514 Rome, Papal States
- Died: 2 October 1589 (aged 75) Rome, Papal States
- Buried: Santa Maria in Publicolis
- Coat of arms

Prospero Pubblicola Santacroce (24 September 1514 – 2 October 1589) was an Italian Roman Catholic bishop and cardinal. He was active in Church affairs as a diplomat and prelate in Rome.

== Biography ==
Santacroce was born in Rome on September 24, 1514, the son of Tarquinio Santacroce and Ersilia de' Massimi. He was the uncle of Cardinal Antonio Santacroce.

He received a doctorate from the University of Padua. He then returned to Rome, becoming a consistorial lawyer in 1537. In 1538, he became the auditor of Fabio Mignanelli, who was then nuncio before Charles V, Holy Roman Emperor. He later became a referendary of the Apostolic Signatura. In 1543, he became an auditor of the Roman Rota. The next year he was an auditor of Cardinal Alessandro Farnese, who was then papal legate a latere in the Holy Roman Empire. He accompanied the cardinal to the Diet of Worms in May 1545.

On March 22, 1548, he was elected Bishop of Cisamus. From April 5, 1548 until April 25, 1550, he was nuncio before Ferdinand, King of the Romans; during this time, he participated in the Diet of Prague, where he argued with the Hussites. He was nuncio to the Kingdom of France from July 15, 1552 until May 23, 1554. He became governor of Bologna on April 2, 1560. He was nuncio extraordinary in Spain in 1560, and nuncio to the Kingdom of Portugal July 6, 1560 until May 10, 1561. During his time in Portugal, he became the first European to cultivate tobacco for the purpose of tobacco smoking; as a result, tobacco's original name in the Italian language was erba Santacroce. From 1561 to 1565, he was again nuncio to the Kingdom of France.

Pope Pius IV made him a cardinal priest in the consistory of March 12, 1565. He did not, however, participate in the papal conclave of 1565-66 that elected Pope Pius V. He received the red hat and the titular church of Saint Jerome of the Croats on February 8, 1566.

On June 17, 1566, he became administrator of the Diocese of Arles, while retaining the government of Cisamus. He opted for the titular church of Santa Maria degli Angeli e dei Martiri on April 12, 1570. He participated in the papal conclave of 1572 that elected Pope Gregory XIII. He resigned the government of Cisamus sometime before December 10, 1572 and of Arles sometime before March 15, 1574. On May 5, 1574, he opted for the titular church of Sant'Adriano al Foro (a deaconry raised to the status of title pro illa vice). He was Camerlengo of the Sacred College of Cardinals from January 9, 1581 to January 8, 1582. On March 4, 1583, he opted for the titular church of San Clemente. He was a participant in the papal conclave of 1585 that elected Pope Sixtus V. On March 2, 1589, he opted for the order of cardinal bishops, receiving the suburbicarian see of Albano.

He died in Rome on October 2, 1589. He was buried in the Basilica di Santa Maria Maggiore. His remains were later transferred to Santa Maria in Publicolis.

== See also ==
- Smoking in Italy
