= Valentino Valentini =

Valentino Valentini may refer to:

- Valentino Valentini (bishop)
- Valentino Valentini (politician)
