= Antonio Lauro (bishop) =

Italian bishop (died 1609)

Most Reverend Antonio Lauro
- Bishop of Belcastro
- Church: Catholic Church
- Diocese: Diocese of Belcastro
- In office: 1599–1609
- Predecessor: Giovanni Francesco Zagordo
- Successor: Pedro de Mata y Haro

Personal details
- Died: 1609 Belcastro, Italy

Antonio Lauro (died 1609) was a Roman Catholic prelate who served as Bishop of Belcastro (1599–1609).

On 13 September 1599, Antonio Lauro was appointed by Pope Clement VIII as Bishop of Belcastro. He served as Bishop of Belcastro until his death in 1609.

== External links and additional sources ==
- Cheney, David M. "Diocese of Belcastro". Catholic-Hierarchy.org. (for Chronology of Bishops) ^{[self-published]}
- Chow, Gabriel. "Titular Episcopal See of Belcastro (Italy)". GCatholic.org. (for Chronology of Bishops) ^{[self-published]}

Catholic Church titles
Preceded by Giovanni Francesco Zagordo	Bishop of Belcastro; 1599–1609	Succeeded by Pedro de Mata y Haro
