= Giovanni Emblaviti =

Italian Roman Catholic prelate

Most Reverend Giovanni Emblaviti
- Bishop of Belcastro
- Church: Catholic Church
- Diocese: Diocese of Belcastro
- In office: 1688–1722
- Predecessor: Giovanni Alfonso Petrucci
- Successor: Michelangelo Gentili

Orders
- Ordination: 24 September 1661
- Consecration: 7 June 1688 by Stefano Giuseppe Menatti

Personal details
- Born: 1638 Bova, Calabria, Italy
- Died: April 1722 (age 84) Belcastro, Italy

Giovanni Emblaviti (1638 – April 1722) was a Roman Catholic prelate who served as Bishop of Belcastro (1688–1722).

== Biography ==
Giovanni Emblaviti was born in Bova, Italy in 1638 and ordained a priest on 24 September 1661. On 31 May 1688, he was appointed during the papacy of Pope Innocent XI as Bishop of Belcastro. On 7 June 1688, he was consecrated bishop by Stefano Giuseppe Menatti, Titular Bishop of Cyrene. He served as Bishop of Belcastro until his death in April 1722.

== External links and additional sources ==
- Cheney, David M. "Diocese of Belcastro". Catholic-Hierarchy.org. (for Chronology of Bishops) ^{[self-published]}
- Chow, Gabriel. "Titular Episcopal See of Belcastro (Italy)". GCatholic.org. (for Chronology of Bishops) ^{[self-published]}

Catholic Church titles
Preceded by Giovanni Alfonso Petrucci	Bishop of Belcastro; 1688–1722	Succeeded by Michelangelo Gentili
