= Alessandro Papatodoro =

Italian Catholic bishop (1560–1597)

Most Reverend Alessandro Papatodoro
- Bishop of Belcastro
- Church: Catholic Church
- Diocese: Diocese of Belcastro
- In office: 1596–1597
- Predecessor: Orazio Schipano
- Successor: Giovanni Francesco Zagordo

Orders
- Ordination: 1589

Personal details
- Born: 1560 Terra Francavilla
- Died: 1597 (age 37) Belcastro, Italy

Alessandro Papatodoro (1560–1597) was a Roman Catholic prelate who served as Bishop of Belcastro (1596–1597).

== Biography ==
Alessandro Papatodoro was born in Terra Francavilla in 1560 and ordained a priest in 1589. On 12 August 1596, he was appointed during the papacy of Pope Paul III as Bishop of Belcastro. He served as Bishop of Belcastro until his death in 1597.

== External links and additional sources ==
- Cheney, David M. "Diocese of Belcastro". Catholic-Hierarchy.org. (for Chronology of Bishops) ^{[self-published]}
- Chow, Gabriel. "Titular Episcopal See of Belcastro (Italy)". GCatholic.org. (for Chronology of Bishops) ^{[self-published]}

Catholic Church titles
Preceded by Orazio Schipano	Bishop of Belcastro; 1596–1597	Succeeded by Giovanni Francesco Zagordo
