= Orazio Schipano =

Italian prelate (died 1596)

Most Reverend Orazio Schipano
- Bishop of Belcastro
- Church: Catholic Church
- Diocese: Diocese of Belcastro
- In office: 1591–1596
- Predecessor: Giovanni Antonio de Paola
- Successor: Alessandro Papatodoro

Personal details
- Died: 1596 Belcastro, Italy

Orazio Schipano (died 1596) was a Roman Catholic prelate who served as Bishop of Belcastro (1591–1596).

== Biography ==
On 13 November 1591, Orazio Schipano was appointed during the papacy of Pope Gregory XIV as Bishop of Belcastro. He served as Bishop of Belcastro until his death in 1596.

While bishop, he was the principal co-consecrator of Francesco Monaco, Bishop of Martirano (1592).

== External links and additional sources ==
- Cheney, David M. "Diocese of Belcastro". Catholic-Hierarchy.org. (for Chronology of Bishops) ^{[self-published]}
- Chow, Gabriel. "Titular Episcopal See of Belcastro (Italy)". GCatholic.org. (for Chronology of Bishops) ^{[self-published]}

Catholic Church titles
Preceded by Giovanni Antonio de Paola	Bishop of Belcastro; 1591–1596	Succeeded by Alessandro Papatodoro
