= Castrocielo =

- Comune
- Comune di Castrocielo
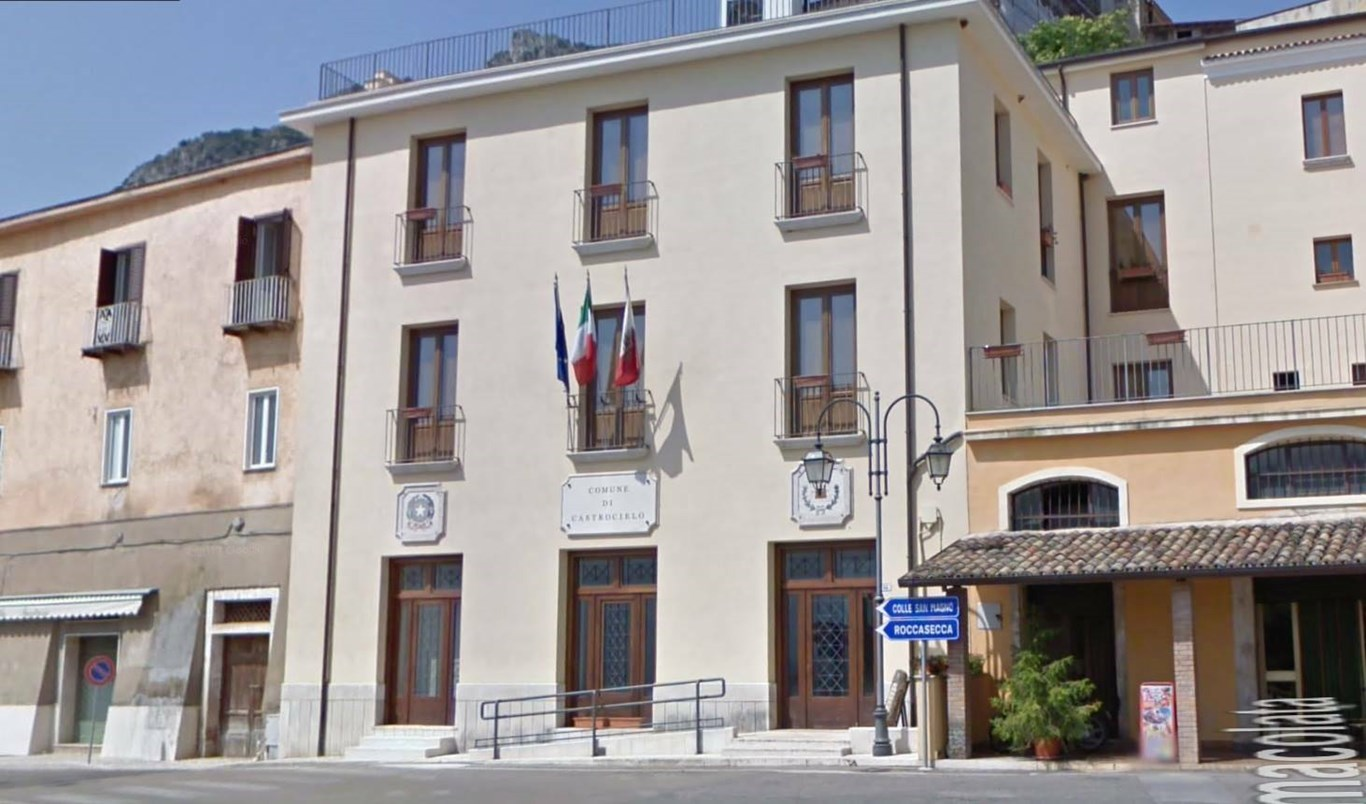
- The Town hall of Castrocielo

- Coat of arms

- Location within Italy Location within Lazio
- Coordinates: 41°32′N 13°42′E
- Country: Italy
- Region: Lazio
- Province: Frosinone (FR)

Government
  - Mayor: Giovanni Fantaccione

Area
  - Total: 27.92 km^{2} (10.78 sq mi)
- Elevation: 250 m (820 ft)

Population (31 October 2019)
  - Total: 3,915
  - Density: 140.2/km^{2} (363.2/sq mi)
- Demonym: Castrocielesi
- Time zone: UTC+1 (CET)
  - Summer (DST): UTC+2 (CEST)
- Postal code: 03030
- Dialing code: 0776
- Patron saint: St. Lucy
- Saint day: December 13
- Website: Official website

Castrocielo is a comune (municipality) in the province of Frosinone in the Italian region Lazio, located about 110 kilometres (68 mi) southeast of Rome and about 30 kilometres (19 mi) southeast of Frosinone.

Castrocielo borders the following municipalities: Aquino, Colle San Magno, Piedimonte San Germano, Pontecorvo, Roccasecca.

== People ==
Angelo Savoldi (1914-2013), American professional wrestler
