= Fulvio Tesorieri =

Roman Catholic

Most Reverend Fulvio Tesorieri
- Bishop of Belcastro
- Church: Catholic Church
- Diocese: Diocese of Belcastro
- In office: 1612–1616
- Predecessor: Gregorio de Sanctis
- Successor: Girolamo Ricciulli

Orders
- Consecration: 30 December 1612 by Giovanni Garzia Mellini

Personal details
- Died: 1616 Belcastro, Italy

Fulvio Tesorieri or Fulvio Thesauro (died 1616) was a Roman Catholic prelate who served as Bishop of Belcastro (1612–1616).

== Biography ==
On 3 December 1612, Fulvio Tesorieri was appointed during the papacy of Pope Paul V as Bishop of Belcastro. On 30 December 1612, he was consecrated bishop by Giovanni Garzia Mellini, Cardinal-Priest of Santi Quattro Coronati, with Decio Caracciolo Rosso, Archbishop of Bari-Canosa, and Giovanni Battista del Tufo, Bishop Emeritus of Acerra, serving as co-consecrators. He served as Bishop of Belcastro until his death in 1616.

== External links and additional sources ==
- Cheney, David M. "Diocese of Belcastro". Catholic-Hierarchy.org. (for Chronology of Bishops) ^{[self-published]}
- Chow, Gabriel. "Titular Episcopal See of Belcastro (Italy)". GCatholic.org. (for Chronology of Bishops) ^{[self-published]}

Catholic Church titles
Preceded by Gregorio de Sanctis	Bishop of Belcastro; 1612–1616	Succeeded by Girolamo Ricciulli
