= Marinari =

Marinari is an Italian surname. Notable people with the surname include:

- Antonio Marinari (1605–1689), Italian Roman Catholic prelate
- Onorio Marinari (1627–1715), Italian painter and printmaker
