= Giovanni Opizzoni =

Italian prelate (died 1474)

Most Reverend Giovanni Opizzoni
- Bishop of Belcastro
- Church: Catholic Church
- Diocese: Diocese of Belcastro
- In office: 1418–1474
- Successor: Raimondo Poerio

Personal details
- Died: 1474 Belcastro, Italy

Giovanni Opizzoni (died 1474) was a Roman Catholic prelate who served as Bishop of Belcastro (1418–1474).

On 24 April 1418, Giovanni Opizzoni was appointed during the papacy of Pope Martin V as Bishop of Belcastro. He served as Bishop of Belcastro until his death in 1474.

== External links and additional sources ==
- Cheney, David M. "Diocese of Belcastro". Catholic-Hierarchy.org. (for Chronology of Bishops) ^{[self-published]}
- Chow, Gabriel. "Titular Episcopal See of Belcastro (Italy)". GCatholic.org. (for Chronology of Bishops) ^{[self-published]}

Catholic Church titles
Preceded by	Bishop of Belcastro; 1418–1474	Succeeded by Raimondo Poerio
