= Leonardo Levato =

Italian Roman Catholic prelate

Most Reverend Leonardo Levato
- Bishop of Belcastro
- Church: Catholic Church
- Diocese: Diocese of Belcastro
- In office: 1518–1533
- Predecessor: Raimondo Poerio
- Successor: Girolamo Fornari

Personal details
- Died: 1533 Belcastro, Italy

Leonardo Levato (died 1533) was a Roman Catholic prelate who served as Bishop of Belcastro (1518–1533).

On 23 August 1518, Leonardo Levato was appointed during the papacy of Pope Leo X as Bishop of Belcastro. He served as Bishop of Belcastro until his death in 1533.

== External links and additional sources ==
- Cheney, David M. "Diocese of Belcastro". Catholic-Hierarchy.org. (for Chronology of Bishops) ^{[self-published]}
- Chow, Gabriel. "Titular Episcopal See of Belcastro (Italy)". GCatholic.org. (for Chronology of Bishops) ^{[self-published]}

Catholic Church titles
Preceded by Raimondo Poerio	Bishop of Belcastro; 1518–1533	Succeeded by Girolamo Fornari
