= Giovanni Alfonso Petrucci =

Italian Roman Catholic prelate

Most Reverend Giovanni Alfonso Petrucci
- Bishop of Belcastro
- Church: Catholic Church
- Diocese: Diocese of Belcastro
- In office: 1686–1688
- Predecessor: Benedetto Bartolo
- Successor: Giovanni Emblaviti

Orders
- Ordination: 23 December 1673
- Consecration: 28 July 1686 by Galeazzo Marescotti

Personal details
- Born: 18 December 1650 Cutro, Italy
- Died: January 1688 (age 37) Belcastro, Italy

Giovanni Alfonso Petrucci (18 December 1650 – January 1688) was a Roman Catholic prelate who served as Bishop of Belcastro (1686–1688).

== Biography ==
Giovanni Alfonso Petrucci was born in Cutro, Italy on 18 December 1650 and ordained a priest on 23 December 1673. On 15 July 1686, he was appointed during the papacy of Pope Innocent XI as Bishop of Belcastro. On 28 July 1686, he was consecrated bishop by Galeazzo Marescotti, Cardinal-Priest of Santi Quirico e Giulitta, with Pietro de Torres, Archbishop of Dubrovnik, and Marcantonio Barbarigo, Archbishop of Corfù, serving as co-consecrators. He served as Bishop of Belcastro until his death in January 1688.

== External links and additional sources ==
- Cheney, David M. "Diocese of Belcastro". Catholic-Hierarchy.org. (for Chronology of Bishops) ^{[self-published]}
- Chow, Gabriel. "Titular Episcopal See of Belcastro (Italy)". GCatholic.org. (for Chronology of Bishops) ^{[self-published]}

Catholic Church titles
Preceded by Benedetto Bartolo	Bishop of Belcastro; 1686–1688	Succeeded by Giovanni Emblaviti
