= Venere =

Venere (the Italian name for Venus) may refer to:

== Locations ==
- Venère, a French town
- Porto Venere, an Italian town
- Venere dei Marsi, a fraction of Pescina

== People ==
- Venere Bianca, an Italian pornographic actress and model
- Venere Pizzinato-Papo, an Italian supercentenarian

== Other uses ==
- "Venere", a Carmen Consoli song from her 1998 album Confusa e felice
- Venere.com, a website focusing on online hotel reservations

== See also ==
- Veneer (disambiguation)
- Venner
- Vener
