= Pasquale Grassi =

Roman Catholic prelate

Most Reverend Pasquale Grassi
- Bishop of Chioggia
- Church: Catholic Church
- Diocese: Diocese of Chioggia
- In office: 1619–1636
- Predecessor: Pietro Paolo Miloto
- Successor: Francesco Grassi

Orders
- Consecration: 2 June 1619 by Ulpiano Volpi

Personal details
- Born: 5 April 1584 Chioggia, Italy
- Died: 12 December 1636 (age 52) Chioggia, Italy

Pasquale Grassi (1584–1636) was a Roman Catholic prelate who served as Bishop of Chioggia (1619–1636).

== Biography ==
Pasquale Grassi was born in Chioggia, Italy on 5 April 1584. On 29 April 1619, he was appointed during the papacy of Pope Paul V as Bishop of Chioggia. On 2 June 1619, he was consecrated bishop by Ulpiano Volpi, Archbishop Emeritus of Chieti, with Galeazzo Sanvitale, Archbishop Emeritus of Bari-Canosa, and Attilio Amalteo, Titular Archbishop of Athenae, serving as co-consecrators. He served as Bishop of Chioggia until his death on 12 December 1636.

== Episcopal succession ==
Episcopal succession of Pasquale Grassi

While bishop, he was the principal co-consecrator of:

- Vincenzo Giustiniani, Bishop of Treviso (1624);
- Filippo Crinò, Bishop of Belcastro (1629);
- Domenico Ferro, Bishop of San Severo (1629); and
- Giovanni Francesco Passionei, Bishop of Cagli (1629).

== External links and additional sources ==
- Cheney, David M. "Diocese of Chioggia". Catholic-Hierarchy.org. (for Chronology of Bishops) ^{[self-published]}
- Chow, Gabriel. "Diocese of Chioggia (Italy)". GCatholic.org. (for Chronology of Bishops) ^{[self-published]}

Catholic Church titles
Preceded by Pietro Paolo Miloto	Bishop of Chioggia; 1619–1636	Succeeded by Francesco Grassi
