= Filippo Crino =

Italian prelate (died 1633)

Most Reverend Filippo Crino
- Bishop of Belcastro
- Church: Catholic Church
- Diocese: Diocese of Belcastro
- In office: 1629–1633
- Predecessor: Antonio Ricciulli
- Successor: Bartolomeo Gessi

Orders
- Consecration: 16 December 1629 by Laudivio Zacchia

Personal details
- Died: 1633 Belcastro, Italy

Filippo Crino or Filippo Zurio (died 1633) was a Roman Catholic prelate who served as Bishop of Belcastro (1629–1633).

== Biography ==
On 19 November 1629, Filippo Crino was appointed during the papacy of Pope Urban VIII as Bishop of Belcastro. On 16 December 1629, he was consecrated bishop by Laudivio Zacchia, Bishop of Corneto e Montefiascone, with Francesco Venturi, Bishop Emeritus of San Severo, and Pasquale Grassi, Bishop of Chioggia, serving as co-consecrators. He served as Bishop of Belcastro until his death in 1633.

== External links and additional sources ==
- Cheney, David M. "Diocese of Belcastro". Catholic-Hierarchy.org. (for Chronology of Bishops) ^{[self-published]}
- Chow, Gabriel. "Titular Episcopal See of Belcastro (Italy)". GCatholic.org. (for Chronology of Bishops) ^{[self-published]}

Catholic Church titles
Preceded by Antonio Ricciulli	Bishop of Belcastro; 1629–1633	Succeeded by Bartolomeo Gessi
