= Giulio Marzi =

Roman Catholic bishop

Most Reverend Giulio Marzi
- Auxiliary Bishop of Ostia-Velletri; Titular Bishop of Heliopolis in Augustamnica
- Church: Catholic Church
- In office: 1693–1718
- Predecessor: Antonio Marinari
- Successor: Gioacchino Maria Oldi

Orders
- Consecration: 27 December 1693 by Galeazzo Marescotti

Personal details
- Born: 11 September 1647 Tivoli, Italy
- Died: February 1718 (aged 70) Ostia, Italy

Giulio Marzi (11 September 1647 – February 1718) was a Roman Catholic prelate who served as Auxiliary Bishop of Ostia-Velletri (1693–1718) and Titular Bishop of Heliopolis in Augustamnica (1693–1718).

== Biography ==
Marzi was born in Tivoli, Italy on 11 September 1647. On 22 December 1693, he was appointed during the papacy of Pope Innocent XII as Auxiliary Bishop of Ostia-Velletri and Titular Bishop of Heliopolis in Augustamnica. On 27 December 1693, he was consecrated bishop by Galeazzo Marescotti, Cardinal-Priest of Santi Quirico e Giulitta, with Filippo Tani, Bishop of Città Ducale, and Giovanni Battista Visconti Aicardi, Bishop of Novara, serving as co-consecrators. He served as Auxiliary Bishop of Ostia-Velletri until his death in February 1718.

Catholic Church titles
Preceded by Antonio Ferrer y Milán	Titular Bishop of Heliopolis in Augustamnica; 1693–1718	Succeeded by Hyacinth Petit
Preceded by Antonio Marinari	Auxiliary Bishop of Ostia-Velletri; 1693–1718	Succeeded by Gioacchino Maria Oldi
