= Giovanni Antonio de Paola =

Italian Roman Catholic prelate

Most Reverend Giovanni Antonio de Paola
- Bishop of Belcastro
- Church: Catholic Church
- Diocese: Diocese of Belcastro
- In office: 1577–1591
- Predecessor: Cesare de' Giacomelli
- Successor: Orazio Schipano

Personal details
- Died: 1591 Belcastro, Italy

Giovanni Antonio de Paola (died 1591) was a Roman Catholic prelate who served as Bishop of Belcastro (1577–1591).

== Biography ==
On 10 May 1577, Giovanni Antonio de Paola was appointed during the papacy of Pope Gregory XIII as Bishop of Belcastro. He served as Bishop of Belcastro until his death in 1591.

== External links and additional sources ==
- Cheney, David M. "Diocese of Belcastro". Catholic-Hierarchy.org. (for Chronology of Bishops) ^{[self-published]}
- Chow, Gabriel. "Titular Episcopal See of Belcastro (Italy)". GCatholic.org. (for Chronology of Bishops) ^{[self-published]}

Catholic Church titles
Preceded by Cesare de' Giacomelli	Bishop of Belcastro; 1577–1591	Succeeded by Orazio Schipano
