= Girolamo Fornari =

Italian Roman Catholic prelate

Most Reverend Girolamo Fornari
- Bishop of Belcastro
- Church: Catholic Church
- Diocese: Diocese of Belcastro
- In office: 1533–1542
- Predecessor: Leonardo Levato
- Successor: Giacomo de' Giacomelli

Personal details
- Died: 1542 Belcastro, Italy

Girolamo Fornari, O.P. (died 1542) was a Roman Catholic prelate who served as Bishop of Belcastro (1533–1542).

== Biography ==
Girolamo Fornari was ordained a priest in the Order of Preachers. On 4 August 1533, he was appointed during the papacy of Pope Clement VII as Bishop of Belcastro. He served as Bishop of Belcastro until his death in 1542.

== External links and additional sources ==
- Cheney, David M. "Diocese of Belcastro". Catholic-Hierarchy.org. (for Chronology of Bishops) ^{[self-published]}
- Chow, Gabriel. "Titular Episcopal See of Belcastro (Italy)". GCatholic.org. (for Chronology of Bishops) ^{[self-published]}

Catholic Church titles
Preceded by Leonardo Levato	Bishop of Belcastro; 1533–1542	Succeeded by Giacomo de' Giacomelli
