= Girolamo Ricciulli =

Roman Catholic prelate

Most Reverend Girolamo Ricciulli
- Bishop of Belcastro
- Church: Catholic Church
- Diocese: Diocese of Belcastro
- In office: 1616–1626
- Predecessor: Fulvio Tesorieri
- Successor: Antonio Ricciulli

Orders
- Consecration: 13 December 1616 by Giovanni Garzia Mellini

Personal details
- Born: 1580 Cosenza, Italy
- Died: 7 August 1626 (age 46) Belcastro, Italy

Girolamo Ricciulli (1580 – 7 August 1626) was a Roman Catholic prelate who served as Bishop of Belcastro (1616–1626).

== Biography ==
Girolamo Ricciulli was born in Cosenza, Italy in 1580.' On 5 December 1616, he was appointed during the papacy of Pope Paul V as Bishop of Belcastro. On 13 December 1616, he was consecrated bishop by Giovanni Garzia Mellini, Cardinal-Priest of Santi Quattro Coronati, with Francesco Sacrati (cardinal), Titular Archbishop of Damascus, and Vincenzo Landinelli, Bishop of Albenga, serving as co-consecrators. He served as Bishop of Belcastro until his death on 7 August 1626.

== Episcopal succession ==
While bishop, he was the principal co-consecrator of:

- Bernardo Florio, Bishop of Canea (1621);
- Paulus Pucciarelli, Bishop of Andros (1621); and
- Bernardino Piccoli, Coadjutor Bishop of Strongoli (1622).

== External links and additional sources ==
- Cheney, David M. "Diocese of Belcastro". Catholic-Hierarchy.org. (for Chronology of Bishops) ^{[self-published]}
- Chow, Gabriel. "Titular Episcopal See of Belcastro (Italy)". GCatholic.org. (for Chronology of Bishops) ^{[self-published]}

Catholic Church titles
Preceded by Fulvio Tesorieri	Bishop of Belcastro; 1616–1626	Succeeded by Antonio Ricciulli
