= Giovanni Francesco Zagordo =

Italian Catholic bishop (died 1599)

Most Reverend Giovanni Francesco Zagordo
- Bishop of Belcastro
- Church: Catholic Church
- Diocese: Diocese of Belcastro
- In office: 1598–1599
- Predecessor: Alessandro Papatodoro
- Successor: Antonio Lauro (bishop)
- Previous post: Bishop of Città Ducale (1593–1598)

Personal details
- Died: 1599 Belcastro, Italy

Giovanni Francesco Zagordo (died 1599) was a Roman Catholic prelate who served as Bishop of Belcastro (1598–1599) and Bishop of Città Ducale (1593–1598).

== Biography ==
On 7 April 1593, Giovanni Francesco Zagordo was appointed during the papacy of Pope Clement VIII as Bishop of Città Ducale. On 23 February 1598, he was appointed during the papacy of Pope Clement VIII as Bishop of Belcastro. He served as Bishop of Belcastro until his death in 1599.

== See also ==
- Catholic Church in Italy

== External links and additional sources ==
- Cheney, David M. "Diocese of Città Ducale". Catholic-Hierarchy.org. (for Chronology of Bishops) ^{[self-published]}
- Chow, Gabriel. "Titular Episcopal See of Città Ducale (Italy)". GCatholic.org. (for Chronology of Bishops) ^{[self-published]}
- Cheney, David M. "Diocese of Belcastro". Catholic-Hierarchy.org. (for Chronology of Bishops) ^{[self-published]}
- Chow, Gabriel. "Titular Episcopal See of Belcastro (Italy)". GCatholic.org. (for Chronology of Bishops) ^{[self-published]}

Catholic Church titles
Preceded by Valentino Valentini	Bishop of Città Ducale; 1593–1598	Succeeded by Jorge de Padilla
Preceded by Alessandro Papatodoro	Bishop of Belcastro; 1598–1599	Succeeded by Antonio Lauro (bishop)
