= Giacomel =

Giacomel (pronounced [dʒakoˈmɛl]) is a surname from Northeast Italy, derived from the given name Giacomo (James). Notable people with the surname include:

- Alessandro Giacomel (born 1998), Italian footballer
- Tommaso Giacomel (born 2000), Italian biathlete

== See also ==
- 21289 Giacomel, a main-belt asteroid
- Giacomelli
