= Sallustio Cherubini =

Most Reverend Sallustio Cherubini
- Bishop of Città Ducale
- Church: Catholic Church
- Diocese: Diocese of Città Ducale
- In office: 1652–1659
- Predecessor: Pomponio Vetuli
- Successor: Giovanni Carlo Valentini

Orders
- Ordination: 29 June 1617
- Consecration: 21 January 1652 by Marcantonio Franciotti

Personal details
- Died: 1659 Città Ducale, Italy

Sallustio Cherubini (died 1659) was a Roman Catholic prelate who served as Bishop of Città Ducale (1652–1659).

== Biography ==
Sallustio Cherubini was ordained a priest on 29 June 1617. On 8 January 1652, he was appointed during the papacy of Pope Innocent X as Bishop of Città Ducale. On 21 January 1652, he was consecrated bishop by Marcantonio Franciotti, Cardinal-Priest of Santa Maria della Pace, with Ranuccio Scotti Douglas, Bishop Emeritus of Borgo San Donnino, and Patrizio Donati, Bishop Emeritus of Minori serving as co-consecrators. He served as Bishop of Città Ducale until his death in 1659.

== External links and additional sources ==
- Cheney, David M. "Diocese of Città Ducale". Catholic-Hierarchy.org. (for Chronology of Bishops) ^{[self-published]}
- Chow, Gabriel. "Titular Episcopal See of Città Ducale (Italy)". GCatholic.org. (for Chronology of Bishops) ^{[self-published]}

Catholic Church titles
Preceded by Pomponio Vetuli	Bishop of Città Ducale; 1652–1659	Succeeded by Giovanni Carlo Valentini
