= Vernier =

Vernier may refer to:

- Vernier, Switzerland
- Vernier (surname)
- Pierre Vernier, French mathematician and inventor of the Vernier scale
- Vernier scale, a secondary measuring device
- Vernier thruster, a secondary control mechanism on spacecraft
- Vernier throttle, a secondary control mechanism on aircraft
- Vernier Software & Technology, an educational technology supplier
- Vernier acuity, a type of visual acuity

== See also ==
- Marais-Vernier
- Veneer (disambiguation)
