= Pedro de Mata y Haro =

Italian Roman Catholic prelate

Most Reverend Pedro de Mata y Haro
- Bishop of Capaccio
- Church: Catholic Church
- See: Diocese of Capaccio
- In office: 1611–1627
- Predecessor: Giovanni Vitelli
- Successor: Francesco Maria Brancaccio
- Previous post: Bishop of Belcastro (1609–1611)

Orders
- Consecration: 5 August 1609 by Giambattista Leni

Personal details
- Born: 1576 Naples, Italy
- Died: 3 March 1627 (age 51) Capaccio, Italy

Pedro de Mata y Haro, C.R. (1576–1627) was a Roman Catholic prelate who served as Bishop of Capaccio (1611–1627) and Bishop of Belcastro (1609–1611).

== Biography ==
Pedro de Mata y Haro was born in Naples, Italy in 1576 and ordained a priest in the Congregation of Clerics Regular of the Divine Providence. On 3 August 1609, he was appointed during the papacy of Pope Paul V as Bishop of Belcastro. On 5 August 1609, he was consecrated bishop by Giambattista Leni, Bishop of Mileto, with Giovanni Battista del Tufo, Bishop Emeritus of Acerra, and Giovanni Vitelli, Bishop of Carinola, serving as co-consecrators. On 28 February 1611, he was appointed during the papacy of Pope Paul V as Bishop of Capaccio. He served as Bishop of Capaccio until his death on 3 March 1627.

While bishop, he was the principal co-consecrator of Manuel Esteban Muniera, Bishop of Cefalù (1621).

== External links and additional sources ==
- Cheney, David M. "Diocese of Belcastro". Catholic-Hierarchy.org. (for Chronology of Bishops) ^{[self-published]}
- Chow, Gabriel. "Titular Episcopal See of Belcastro". GCatholic.org. (for Chronology of Bishops) ^{[self-published]}
- Cheney, David M. "Diocese of Vallo della Lucania". Catholic-Hierarchy.org. (for Chronology of Bishops) ^{[self-published]}
- Chow, Gabriel. "Diocese of Vallo della Lucania (Italy)". GCatholic.org. (for Chronology of Bishops) ^{[self-published]}

Catholic Church titles
Preceded by Antonio Lauro (bishop)	Bishop of Belcastro; 1609–1611	Succeeded by Gregorio de Sanctis
Preceded by Giovanni Vitelli	Bishop of Capaccio; 1611–1627	Succeeded by Francesco Maria Brancaccio
