= Raimondo Poerio =

Italian prelate

Most Reverend Raimondo Poerio
- Bishop of Belcastro
- Church: Catholic Church
- Diocese: Diocese of Belcastro
- In office: 1474–1518
- Predecessor: Giovanni Opizzoni
- Successor: Leonardo Levato

Raimondo Poerio, O.P. was a Roman Catholic prelate who served as Bishop of Belcastro (1474–1518).

== Biography ==
Raimondo Poerio was ordained a priest in the Order of Preachers. In September 1474, he was appointed during the papacy of Pope Sixtus IV as Bishop of Belcastro. He served as Bishop of Belcastro until his resignation on 9 August 1518.

== External links and additional sources ==
- Cheney, David M. "Diocese of Belcastro". Catholic-Hierarchy.org. (for Chronology of Bishops) ^{[self-published]}
- Chow, Gabriel. "Titular Episcopal See of Belcastro (Italy)". GCatholic.org. (for Chronology of Bishops) ^{[self-published]}

Catholic Church titles
Preceded by Giovanni Opizzoni	Bishop of Belcastro; 1474–1518	Succeeded by Leonardo Levato
