= Massimi =

Massimi is a surname. Notable people with this name include:

- Pope Paschal I, born Pascale Massimi (died 824)
- Camillo Massimi (1620–1677), Italian cardinal and patron of artists
- Felice de Massimi (1501–1573), Bishop of Città Ducale
- Massimo Massimi (1877–1954), Italian Catholic cardinal
- Michela Massimi, Italian philosopher of science
- Petronilla Paolini Massimi (1663–1726), Italian poet and writer
- Xavier Massimi (born 1981), Mexican actor

== See also ==
- Massimo family, noble family of Rome
