= Giovanni Delfino (cardinal) =

Italian Catholic Cardinal, writer and playwright

His Eminence Giovanni Delfino
- Cardinal-Deacon of Santi Vito, Modesto e Crescenzia; Patriarch of Aquileia
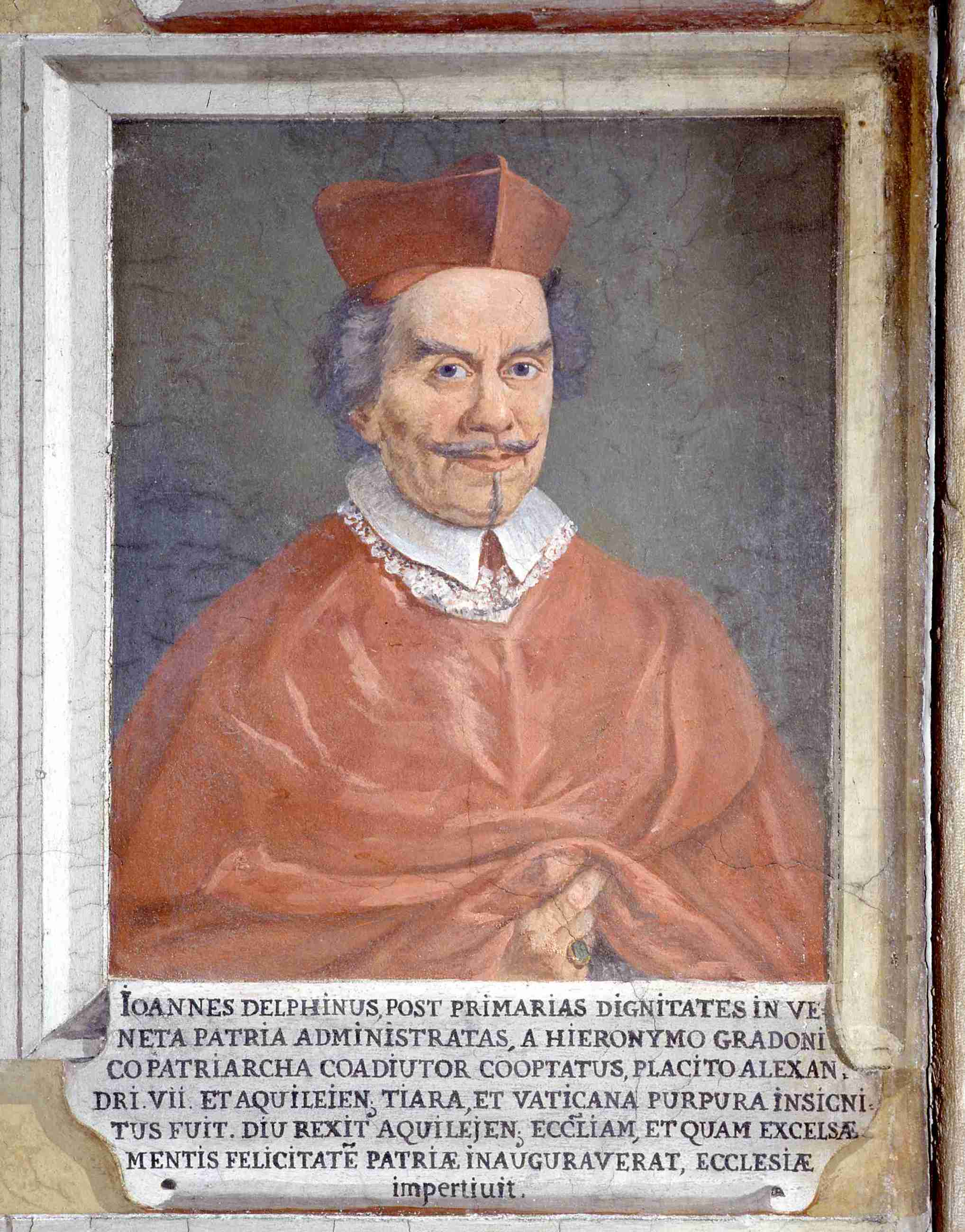
- Giovanni Delfino
- Church: Catholic Church

Orders
- Consecration: 30 November 1656 by Carlo Carafa della Spina
- Created cardinal: 18 July 1667 by Pope Alexander VII
- Rank: Cardinal-Priest of San Salvatore in Lauro; Cardinal-Deacon of Santi Vito, Modesto e Crescenzia

Personal details
- Born: 22 April 1617 Venice, Republic of Venice
- Died: 19 July 1699 (age 82) Udine, Republic of Venice
- Buried: San Michele in Isola
- Education: University of Padua
- Coat of arms

Giovanni Dolfin (or Delfino) (Venice, 22 April 1617 - Udine, 20 July 1699) was an Italian Catholic Cardinal, scholar, writer and playwright, Patriarch of Aquileia from 1657 to his death.

== Biography ==
The nephew of Giovanni Delfino seniore, he received a comprehensive cultural education and graduated in utroque iure at the University of Padua. He was at first senator of the Republic of Venice, then, after various ecclesiastical duties he was consecrated titular bishop of Tagaste on 30 November 1656 by Carlo Carafa della Spina, Bishop of Aversa. In 1656 Girolamo Gradenigo wanted him as coadjutor in the Patriarchate of Aquileia. He succeeded him as patriarch two years later. He governed the patriarchate through his brother and nephew, who were his coadjutors with right of succession.

On the request of the Republic of Venice, on 18 July 1667 Pope Alexander VII appointed him Cardinal-Priest of San Salvatore in Lauro and then Cardinal-Deacon of Santi Vito, Modesto e Crescenzia. He was commendatory abbot of Rosazzo from 1668 until his death.

He took part in the conclave of 1667, that of 1669–1670, that of 1676, that of 1689 and finally that of 1691; during the latter he was among the principal papabili, but his election was blocked by the Spaniards who did not see favorably a Venetian on the papal throne.

While bishop, he was the principal consecrator of Alvise Sagredo, Patriarch of Venice (1678). He is buried in the tomb of his ancestors in the church of San Michele in Isola.

== Works ==
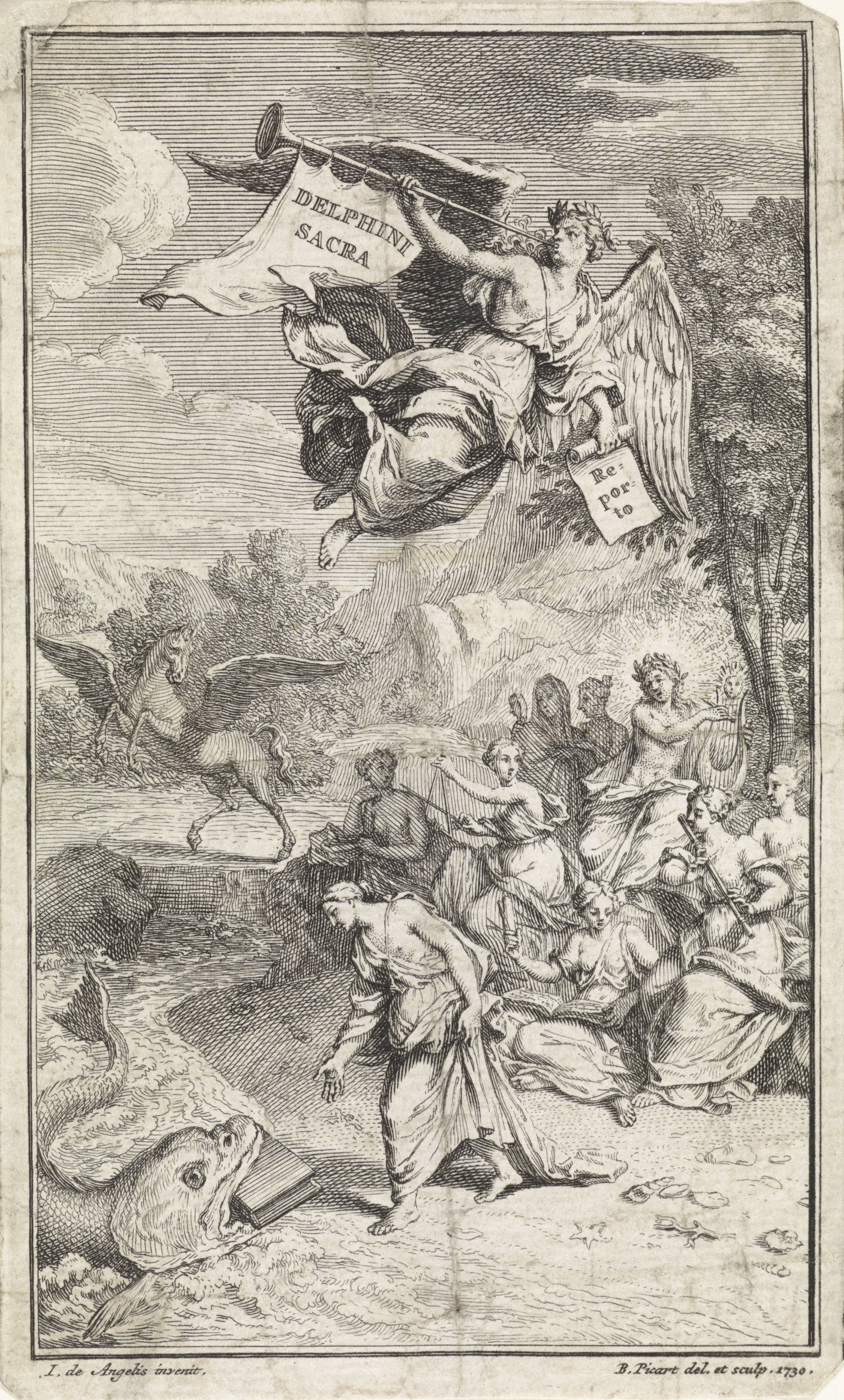
Parnaso del'Em.mo Cardinal Delfino. Utrecht: Willem Kroon, 1730

Delfino's literary activity begun in his university years in Padua. Today he is chiefly remembered for his four plays. He wrote three historical tragedies based on the traditional Counter-Reformation conflict between reason of state and love or personal ethics: Cleopatra, Lucrezia, Creso; and a free adaptation from the Orlando Furioso, Medoro, all printed posthumously. Delfino contributed to the controversy over the propriety of rhyme in tragedy, and himself used less rhyme in his later works.

Although well known and appreciated in intellectually distinguished circles, Delfino chose not to publish his works during his lifetime. The Cleopatra was first printed in Scipione Maffei's collection Teatro italiano. The four tragedies were published in Utrecht in 1730 and re-edited in a much more correct edition by Comino in Padua in 1733 together with an apologetic Dialogo sopra le tragedie, in which he advocated a neoclassical reform of tragedy.

Delfino wrote six Dialogues in verse on philosophical and scientific questions that were published posthumously in Venice in 1740. He left two manuscripts containing ten philosophical and scientific Dialogues in prose. Delfino appears to be very well versed in the New Science, discusses Pierre Gassendi’s and Galileo’s theories, Lucretius' atomism, the philosophy of Franciscus Patricius and Francis Bacon and the scientific and philosophical ideas of Fortunio Liceti and Athanasius Kircher. His vivid writing style was much appreciated by Orazio Rucellai and Carlo Roberto Dati. Only one of his prose Dialogues - dedicated to astronomy - has been published.

He wrote also poems on celebratory, heroic or meditative subjects and ethical and political remarks on Sallust's Bellum Catilinae and Tacitus's Agricola.

Delfino was made a member of the Accademia Galileiana on April 3, 1645, and of the Accademia della Crusca on September 27, 1667. His correspondents included, among others: the poets Ciro di Pers, and Michelangelo Torcigliani, the Emperor Leopold I, the Generalfeldmarschall Raimondo Montecuccoli, the Cardinal Giulio Rospigliosi (famous poet and future Pope Clement IX) and the Jesuit philosopher and Cardinal Francesco Sforza Pallavicino.

== List of works ==
- Parnaso del'Em.mo Cardinal Delfino. Vol. 1. Utrecht: Willem Kroon. 1730.
- Parnaso del'Em.mo Cardinal Delfino. Vol. 2. Utrecht: Willem Kroon. 1730.
- Le tragedie di Giovanni Delfino senatore veneziano, poi patriarca d'Aquileja, e cardinale di Santa Chiesa, cioè La Cleopatra, Il Creso, La Lucrezia, Il Medoro, ora la prima volta alla sua vera lezione ridotte; e illustrate col Dialogo apologetico dell'autore, non piu stampato. Padua: Giuseppe Comino. 1733.

== Bibliography ==
- Chiurlo, Bindo (1939). "I manoscritti letterari del patriarca Giovanni Delfino". Archivio Veneto. XXIV: 121–71.
- Anselmo, Francesco (1962). Giovanni Delfino tra classico e barocco. Messina: Peloritana Editrice.
- Dalla Valle, Daniela (1970). "Il neostoicismo in una tragedia barocca italiana. La Cleopatra del cardinal Delfino". La frattura. Studi sul barocco letterario francese. Ravenna: Edizioni A. Longo. pp. 306–17.
- Sarnelli, Mauro (1995). "«Ed a me piacque sempre / filosofar con libertà...» i sei dialoghi filosofico-scientifici in poesia di Giovanni Delfino". Philo(:)logica. IV (7): 66–89 and 8, 96–118.
- Sarnelli, Mauro (1996). ""Maravigliosa chiarezza", "raccomandazioni" e "mal di pietra": il carteggio Delfino-Pers". Studi secenteschi. 37: 225–315.
- Taddeo, Edoardo (1999). "Torcigliani e Delfino, patriarca atomista". Studi secenteschi. 40: 83–95.

Catholic Church titles
Preceded by	Titular Archbishop of Thagaste; 1656–1657	Succeeded by Antonio Marinari
Preceded by Gerolamo Gradenigo	Patriarch of Aquileia; 1657–1699	Succeeded by Dionisio Dolfino
Preceded by Francesco Sforza Pallavicino	Cardinal-Priest of San Salvatore in Lauro; 1667–1670	Succeeded by
Preceded by Francesco Maria Mancini	Cardinal-Priest of Santi Vito, Modesto e Crescenzia; 1670–1699	Succeeded by Fabio Olivieri
