= Antonio Ricciulli =

Roman Catholic prelate

Most Reverend Antonio Ricciulli
- Archbishop of Cosenza
- Church: Catholic Church
- Archdiocese: Archdiocese of Cosenza
- In office: 1641–1643
- Predecessor: Martino Alfieri
- Successor: Alfonso Maurelli
- Previous posts: Bishop of Belcastro (1626–1629); Bishop of Umbriatico (1632–1639); Bishop of Caserta (1639–1641)

Personal details
- Born: 30 May 1582 Rogliano, Italy
- Died: May 1643 (age 60) Cosenza, Italy

Antonio Ricciulli (30 May 1582 – May 1643) was a Roman Catholic prelate who served as Archbishop of Cosenza (1641–1643), Bishop of Caserta (1639–1641), Bishop of Umbriatico (1632–1639), and Bishop of Belcastro (1626–1629).

== Biography ==
Antonio Ricciulli was born in Rogliano, Italy on 30 May 1582. On 16 November 1626, he was appointed during the papacy of Pope Urban VIII as Bishop of Belcastro. He resigned as Bishop of Belcastro in 1629. As vicegerent of the diocese of Rome, he was invested with powers in matters of civil and criminal jurisdiction, and in 1632 he also granted the imprimatur to Galileo Galilei 's Dialogue Concerning the Two Chief World Systems By using the si videbitur clause, he left the final decision to the Master of the Sacred Apostolic Palace. However, the authorization to print the Dialogue probably put him in difficulty with the Pope. On 16 February 1632, he was appointed during the papacy of Pope Urban VIII as Bishop of Umbriatico. On 7 February 1639, he was appointed during the papacy of Pope Urban VIII as Bishop of Caserta. On 27 November 1641, he was appointed during the papacy of Pope Urban VIII as Archbishop of Cosenza. He served as Archbishop of Cosenza until his death in May 1643.

== Episcopal succession ==
While bishop, he was the principal co-consecrator of:

- Giuseppe Candido, Bishop of Lipari (1628);
- Consalvo Caputo, Bishop of San Marco (1630);
- Ulderico Carpegna, Bishop of Gubbio (1630);
- Giovanni Battista Scanaroli, Titular Bishop of Sidon (1630);
- Tegrimus Tegrimi, Bishop of Assisi (1630); and
- Giorgio Bolognetti, Bishop of Ascoli Satriano (1630).

== External links and additional sources ==
- Cheney, David M. "Diocese of Belcastro". Catholic-Hierarchy.org. (for Chronology of Bishops) ^{[self-published]}
- Chow, Gabriel. "Titular Episcopal See of Belcastro (Italy)". GCatholic.org. (for Chronology of Bishops) ^{[self-published]}
- Cheney, David M. "Diocese of Umbriatico (Umbriaticum)". Catholic-Hierarchy.org. (for Chronology of Bishops) ^{[self-published]}
- Chow, Gabriel. "Titular Episcopal See of Umbriatico (Italy)". GCatholic.org. (for Chronology of Bishops) ^{[self-published]}
- Cheney, David M. "Diocese of Caserta". Catholic-Hierarchy.org. (for Chronology of Bishops) ^{[self-published]}
- Chow, Gabriel. "Diocese of Caserta (Italy)". GCatholic.org. (for Chronology of Bishops) ^{[self-published]}
- Cheney, David M. "Archdiocese of Cosenza-Bisignano". Catholic-Hierarchy.org. (for Chronology of Bishops) ^{[self-published]}
- Chow, Gabriel. "Metropolitan Archdiocese of Cosenza-Bisignano (Italy)". GCatholic.org. (for Chronology of Bishops) ^{[self-published]}

Catholic Church titles
Preceded by Girolamo Ricciulli	Bishop of Belcastro; 1626–1629	Succeeded by Filippo Crinò
Preceded by Benedetto Baaz	Bishop of Umbriatico; 1632–1639	Succeeded by Bartolomeo Cresconi
Preceded by Alessandro Suardi	Bishop of Caserta; 1639–1641	Succeeded by Bruno Sciamanna
Preceded by Martino Alfieri	Archbishop of Cosenza; 1641–1643	Succeeded by Alfonso Maurelli
