= Giacomo =

Giacomo ([ˈdʒaːkomo]) is an Italian given name corresponding to English James. It is the Italian version of the Hebrew name Jacob.

People bearing the name include:

- Giacomo Acerbo (1888–1969), Italian economist and fascist politician
- Giacomo Agostini (born 1942), Italian motorcycle road racer
- Giacomo Aimoni (1939–2026), Italian ski jumper
- Giacomo Antonelli (1806–1876), Italian cardinal
- Giacomo Aragall (born 1939), Catalan tenor
- Giacomo Balla (1871–1958), Italian painter
- Giacomo Balzarini (born 1968), Swiss-Italian manager
- Giacomo Barozzi da Vignola (1507–1573), Italian architect
- Giacomo Beltrami (1779–1855), Italian jurist, author, and explorer
- Giacomo Biffi (1928–2015), Italian cardinal
- Giacomo Bonaventura (born 1989), Italian footballer
- Giacomo Boni (archaeologist) (1859–1925), Italian archaeologist
- Giacomo Boni (painter) (1688–1766), Italian painter
- Giacomo Brodolini (1920–1969), Italian politician
- Giacomo Carissimi (1605–1674), Italian Baroque composer
- Giacomo Casanova (1725–1798), Venetian adventurer and author
- Giacomo Ceruti (1698–1767), Italian painter
- Giacomo Colombo (1663–1730) Italian sculptor
- Giacomo Doria (1840–1913), Italian naturalist
- Giacomo Durazzo (1717–1794), Italian diplomat and man of the theatre
- Giacomo Feo (c. 1471–1495), second husband of Caterina Sforza
- Giacomo Ferrara (born 1990), actor
- Giacomo Ferrari (disambiguation)
- Giacomo Gastaldi (ca 1500–1566), Italian cartographer
- Giacomo di Grassi, 16th century Italian fencing master and author
- Giacomo Lauri-Volpi (1892–1979), Italian tenor
- Giacomo da Lentini (13th century), Italian poet
- Giacomo Leone (born 1971), Italian long-distance runner
- Giacomo Leoni (1686–1746), Italian architect
- Giacomo Leopardi (1798–1837), Italian poet, essayist, philosopher and philologist
- Giacomo Lercaro (1891–1976), Italian cardinal
- Giacomo del Maino (before 1469 – 1503 or 1505), Italian architect and sculptor
- Giacomo Manzù (1908–1991), Italian sculptor
- Giacomo Matteotti (1885–1924), Italian socialist parliamentarian murdered for his opposition to Mussolini
- Giacomo Medici (general) (1817–1882), Italian patriot and soldier
- Giacomo Meyerbeer (1791–1864), German-born opera composer
- Giacomo Nizzolo (born 1989), Italian road cyclist
- Giacomo Perolini (died 2005), Italian physician, photographer and art historian
- Giacomo della Porta (c. 1533–1602), Italian architect and sculptor
- Giacomo Puccini (1858–1924), Italian composer
- Giacomo Quarenghi (1744–1817), Italian architect
- Giacomo Raspadori (born 2000), Italian footballer
- Giacomo Ricci (born 1985), Italian racing driver
- Giacomo Sagripanti (born 1982), Italian conductor
- Giacomo Salvalaggio (born 2001), Italian para-cyclist
- Giacomo Tamburelli (died 2025), Panamanian businessman
- Giacomo Tomaselli (born 1999), Italian footballer
- Giacomo Tortora (born 1977), Italian Formula One engineer
