= Filippo Tani =

Most Reverend Filippo Tani
- Bishop of Città Ducale
- Church: Catholic Church
- Diocese: Diocese of Città Ducale
- In office: 1686–1712
- Predecessor: Francesco Di Giangirolamo
- Successor: Pietro Giacomo Pichi

Orders
- Ordination: 7 April 1654
- Consecration: 15 April 1686 by Alessandro Crescenzi (cardinal)

Personal details
- Born: 3 May 1631 Albano, Italy
- Died: 1 January 1712 (age 54) Città Ducale, Italy

Filippo Tani, O.S.B. (3 May 1631 – 1 January 1712) was a Roman Catholic prelate who served as Bishop of Città Ducale (1686–1712).

== Biography ==
Filippo Tani was born in Albano, Italy on 3 May 1631 and ordained a priest in the Order of Saint Benedict on 7 April 1654. On 1 April 1686, he was appointed during the papacy of Pope Innocent XI as Bishop of Città Ducale. On 15 April 1686, he was consecrated bishop by Alessandro Crescenzi (cardinal), Cardinal-Priest of Santa Prisca, with Francesco Casati, Titular Archbishop of Trapezus, and Marcantonio Barbarigo, Archbishop of Corfù, serving as co-consecrators. He served as Bishop of Città Ducale until his death on 1 January 1712.

== Episcopal succession ==
While bishop, he was the principal co-consecrator of:

- Carlo Giuseppe Morozzo, Bishop of Bobbio (1693);
- Giulio Marzi, Auxiliary Bishop of Ostia-Velletri (1693); and
- Biagio Gambaro, Bishop of Telese o Cerreto Sannita (1693).

== External links and additional sources ==
- Cheney, David M. "Diocese of Città Ducale". Catholic-Hierarchy.org. (for Chronology of Bishops) ^{[self-published]}
- Chow, Gabriel. "Titular Episcopal See of Città Ducale (Italy)". GCatholic.org. (for Chronology of Bishops) ^{[self-published]}

Catholic Church titles
Preceded by Francesco Di Giangirolamo	Bishop of Città Ducale; 1686–1712	Succeeded by Pietro Giacomo Pichi
