= Giacomo de' Giacomelli =

Italian Roman Catholic prelate

Most Reverend Giacomo de' Giacomelli
- Church: Catholic Church
- Diocese: Diocese of Belcastro
- In office: 1542–1552
- Predecessor: Girolamo Fornari
- Successor: Cesare de' Giacomelli

Giacomo de' Giacomelli was a Roman Catholic prelate who served as Bishop of Belcastro (1542–1552).

On 5 May 1542, Giacomo de' Giacomelli was appointed during the papacy of Pope Paul III as Bishop of Belcastro. He served as Bishop of Belcastro until his resignation on 14 Dec 1552.

While bishop, he was the principal co-consecrator of Giulio Antonio Santorio, Archbishop of Santa Severina (1566).

== External links and additional sources ==
- Cheney, David M. "Diocese of Belcastro". Catholic-Hierarchy.org. (for Chronology of Bishops) ^{[self-published]}
- Chow, Gabriel. "Titular Episcopal See of Belcastro (Italy)". GCatholic.org. (for Chronology of Bishops) ^{[self-published]}

Catholic Church titles
Preceded by Girolamo Fornari	Bishop of Belcastro; 1542–1552	Succeeded by Cesare de' Giacomelli
