= Roccabascerana =

- Comune
- Comune di Roccabascerana
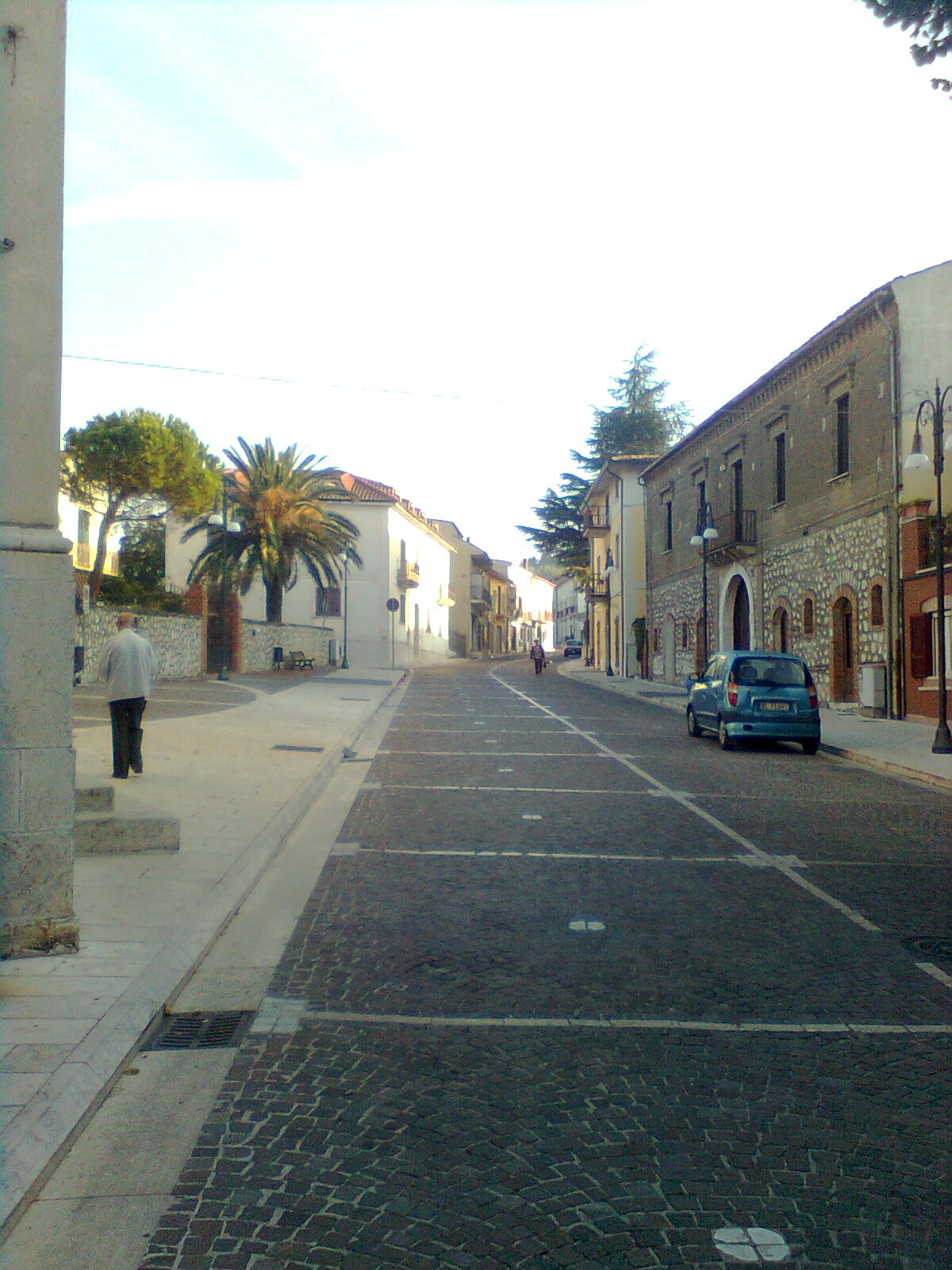
- Coat of arms
- Location within Italy Location within Campania
- Coordinates: 41°1′N 14°43′E
- Country: Italy
- Region: Campania
- Province: Avellino (AV)
- Frazioni: Cassano Caudino, Squillani, Tufara Valle, Tuoro, Zolli

Government
  - Mayor: Roberto Del Grosso

Area
  - Total: 12.46 km^{2} (4.81 sq mi)
- Elevation: 350 m (1,150 ft)

Population (31 March 2022)
  - Total: 2,329
  - Density: 186.9/km^{2} (484.1/sq mi)
- Time zone: UTC+1 (CET)
  - Summer (DST): UTC+2 (CEST)
- Postal code: 83016
- Dialing code: 0825
- Patron saint: Saint George and Saint Leonard
- Saint day: 23 April
- Website: Official website

Roccabascerena is a town and comune in the province of Avellino, Campania, southern Italy.
