= Veneer =

Veneer may refer to:

== Materials ==
- Masonry veneer, a thin facing layer of brick
- Stone veneer, a thin facing layer of stone
- Veneer (dentistry), a cosmetic treatment for teeth
- Wood veneer, a thin facing layer of wood

== Arts and entertainment ==
- Veneer (album), by José González, 2003
- Veneer (EP), by September Girls, 2014
- "Veneer", a song by the Verve Pipe from Villains
- Veneer Magazine, an annual art publication

== See also ==
- Veneer theory, a term coined by Dutch primatologist Frans de Waal to label the Hobbesian view of human morality
- Vernier (disambiguation)
