= Roman Catholic Diocese of Città Ducale =

The Diocese of Città Ducale (Latin: Dioecesis Civitatis Ducalis) was a Roman Catholic diocese in Italy, located in the city of Cittaducale in the Province of Rieti, in the Lazio region. In 1818, it was suppressed to the Diocese of L'Aquila.

== History ==
- 1502 January 24: Established as Diocese of Città Ducale (Civitatis Ducalis)
- 1505 November 8: Suppressed to the Diocese of Rieti
- 1508 October 17: Restored as Diocese of Città Ducale from Diocese of Rieti
- 1818 June 27: Suppressed to the Diocese of L'Aquila
- 1968: Restored as Titular Episcopal See of Città Ducale

== Ordinaries ==
- Matteo Orsini (bishop) (24 Jan 1502 – 8 Nov 1505 Appointed, Bishop of Calvi Risorta)
- Giacomo Alfaridio (16 Oct 1508 – 1511 Died)
- Giacomo de Massimi (12 Dec 1511 – 1525 Resigned)
- Felice de Massimi (7 Apr 1525 – 1573 Died)
- Pompilio Perotti (3 Jul 1573 – 4 May 1580 Appointed, Bishop of Guardialfiera)
- Valentino Valentini (14 Nov 1580 – 1593 Died)
- Giovanni Francesco Zagordo (7 Apr 1593 – 23 Feb 1598 Appointed, Bishop of Belcastro)
- Jorge de Padilla, O.P. (18 Aug 1598 – 1608 Died)
- Pietro Paolo Quintavalle (23 Mar 1609 – Aug 1626 Died)
- Nicola Benigno (8 Feb 1627 – 1632 Died)
- Pomponio Vetuli (24 Nov 1632 – 1652 Died)
- Sallustio Cherubini (8 Jan 1652 – 1659 Died)
- Giovanni Carlo Valentini (9 Jun 1659 – Aug 1681 Died)
- Francesco Di Giangirolamo (12 Jan 1682 – Oct 1685 Died)
- Filippo Tani, O.S.B. (1 Apr 1686 – 1 Jan 1712 Died)
- Pietro Giacomo Pichi (10 Jan 1718 – Mar 1733 Died)
- Francesco Rivera (22 Jun 1733 – 25 May 1742 Appointed, Archbishop of Manfredonia)
- Angelo Maria Marculli, O.S.A. (25 May 1742 – 10 May 1745 Appointed, Bishop of Bitetto)
- Niccola Maria Calcagnini (10 May 1745 – 20 Aug 1786 Died)
- Pasquale Martini (18 Jun 1792 – 1798 Died)

== See also ==
- Catholic Church in Italy
