= Giacomo Balzarini =

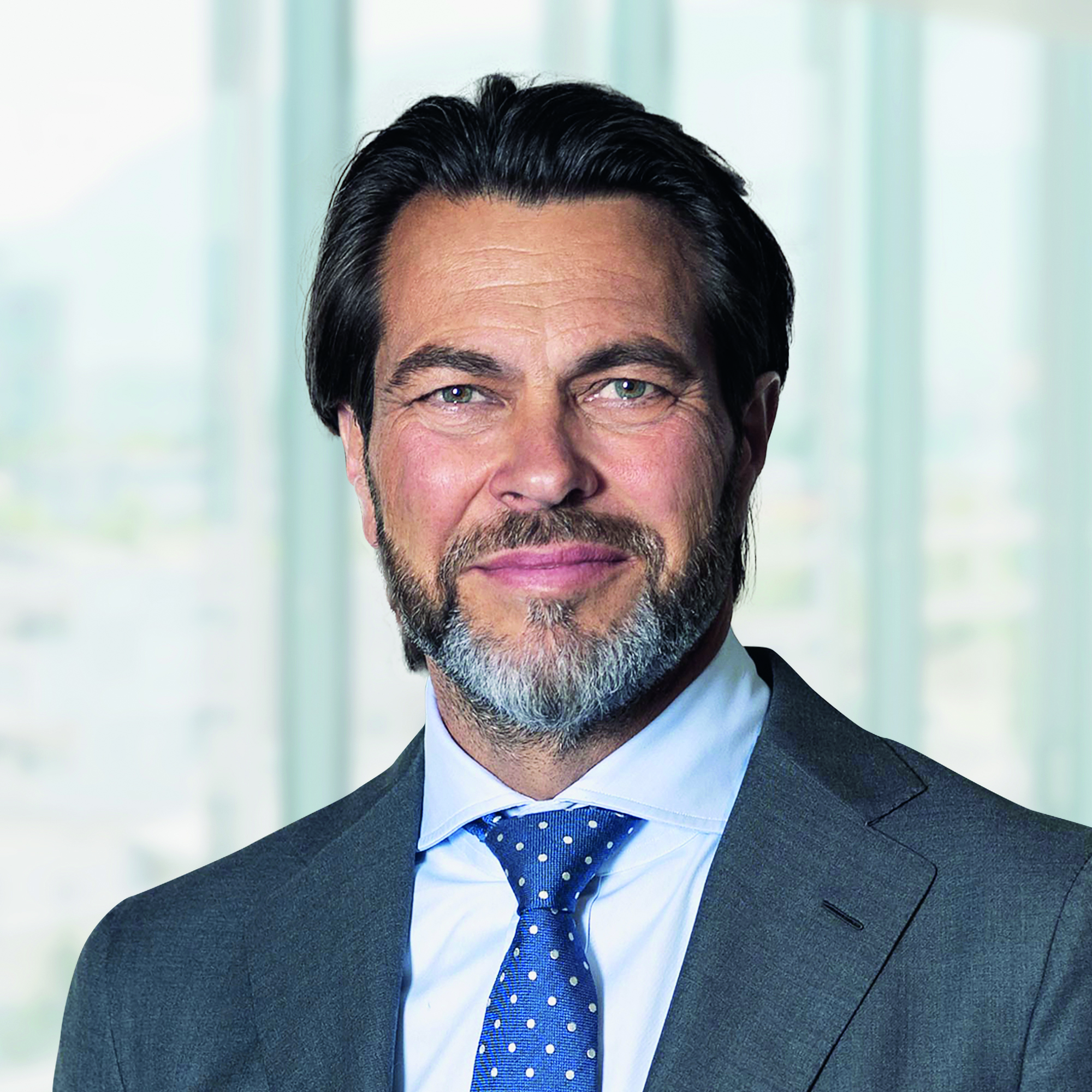
Giacomo Balzarini, CEO of PSP Swiss Property

Giacomo Balzarini (born 1968 in Baden, Switzerland) is a Swiss-Italian manager. He has been chief executive officer (CEO) of PSP Swiss Property since 1 April 2017.

== Education and career ==
Balzarini completed his studies in economics at the University of Zurich in 1996. In 2002 he obtained an MBA from the University of Chicago (Ill., USA).

From mid-1993 to 1996, Balzarini worked for Union Bank of Switzerland in Zurich in the areas of corporate account management and business development. From 1997 until 2006 he worked at Swiss Reinsurance Company in risk and project management, strategic development, and asset management; his last position at Swiss Reinsurance Company was managing director, responsible for building up the company's indirect international real estate portfolio.

== Further activities ==
- Chairman of the Board of Seewarte Holding AG, Zug
- Member of the Foundation Board of Ernst Göhner Stiftung, Zug
- Vice-chairman of the Board of Hardturm AG, Zurich
- Chairman of the EPRA Best Practices Committee of the European Public Real Estate Association (EPRA, Brussels), Chairman of the EPRA Accounting & Reporting Committee and Member of the EPRA Advisory Board
- Member of the Board of Directors of Engadin Kulm AG, St. Moritz, with the two five-star hotels Kulm in St. Moritz and Kronenhof in Pontresina
