= Felice de Massimi =

Roman Catholic prelate (1501–1573)

Most Reverend Felice de Massimi
- Bishop of Città Ducale
- Church: Catholic Church
- Diocese: Diocese of Città Ducale
- In office: 1525–1573
- Predecessor: Giacomo de Massimi
- Successor: Pompilio Perotti

Personal details
- Born: 1501
- Died: 1573 (age 72) Città Ducale, Italy

Felice de Massimi (1501–1573) was a Roman Catholic prelate who served as Bishop of Città Ducale (1525–1573).

== Biography ==
Felice de Massimi was born in 1501. On 7 April 1525, he was appointed during the papacy of Pope Clement VII as Bishop of Città Ducale. He served as Bishop of Città Ducale until his death in 1573.

== External links and additional sources ==
- Cheney, David M. "Diocese of Città Ducale". Catholic-Hierarchy.org. (for Chronology of Bishops) ^{[self-published]}
- Chow, Gabriel. "Titular Episcopal See of Città Ducale (Italy)". GCatholic.org. (for Chronology of Bishops) ^{[self-published]}

Catholic Church titles
Preceded by Giacomo de Massimi	Bishop of Città Ducale; 1525–1573	Succeeded by Pompilio Perotti
