= Giacomini (surname) =

Giacomini is an Italian surname, derived from the diminutive of the masculine Italian personal name Giacomo (James). Notable people with the surname include:

- Andrea Giacomini (born 1987), Italian footballer
- Audrey Giacomini (born 1986), French actress and model
- Breno Giacomini (born 1985), American football offensive tackle
- Carlo Giacomini (1840–1898), Italian anatomist and neuroscientist
- Diogo Giacomini (born 1979), Brazilian football manager
- Gianni Giacomini (born 1958), retired Italian cyclist
- Giuseppe Giacomini (1940–2021), Italian dramatic tenor
- Kathleen Giacomini, American bioengineer
- Massimo Giacomini (born 1939), retired Italian football player and football manager
