= Santa Maria in Publicolis =

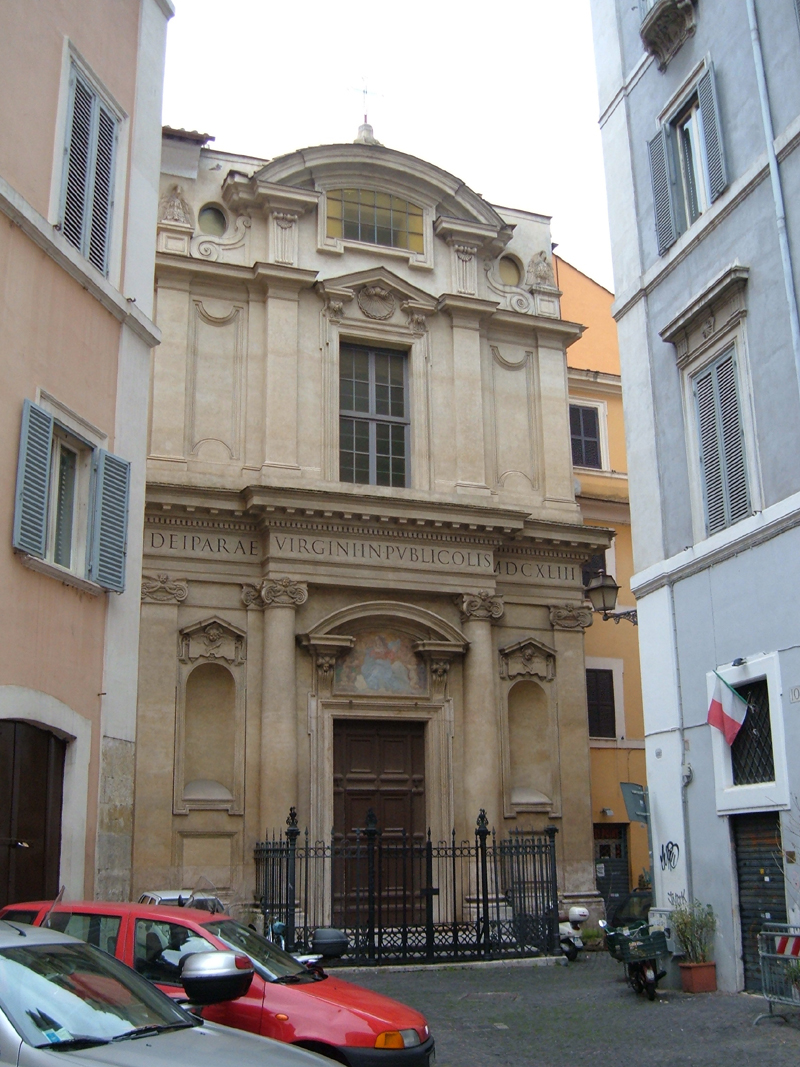
- Façade of the church
- Click on the map for a fullscreen view
- 41°53′37.7″N 12°28′34.6″E
- Location: Rome
- Country: Italy
- Denomination: Roman Catholic

Architecture
- Architect: Giovan Antonio de' Rossi
- Architectural type: Church
- Style: Baroque
- Completed: 1643

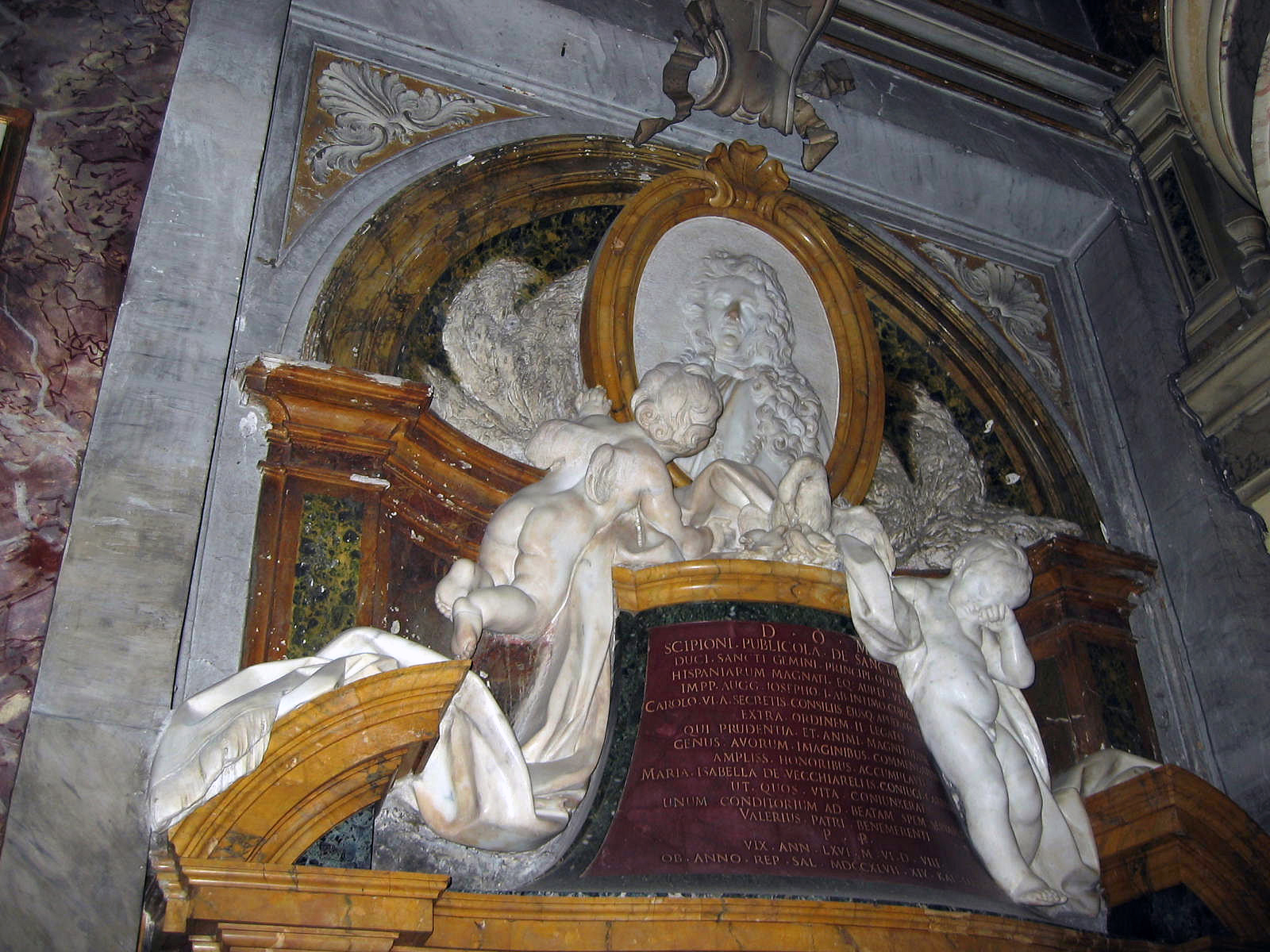
Monument to Scipione Publicola Santacroce (1749) by Maini.

Santa Maria in Publicolis is a Baroque church in Rome. It is located in the rione of Sant'Eustachio. The facade was designed by Giovan Antonio de' Rossi.

== History and description ==
The derivation of the suffix name of the church is unclear; some sources said that Valerio Publicola named the church. But others state the family of the prince Santacroce founded the church. Cardinal Marcello Santacroce rebuilt this parish church in 1645 using the designs of Giovanni Antonio de Rossi. The first chapel on the right and the main altarpiece were by Ottavio Vannini. The St Francis painted for an altar is a copy by Giovanni Francesco Grimaldi of a work by Carracci. Grimaldi also fashioned the tomb monument of the Santacroce family. The portrait of D. Scipione was completed by Giovanni Battista Maini.
