= Sophie Janinet =

French painter and printmaker (1779–1819)

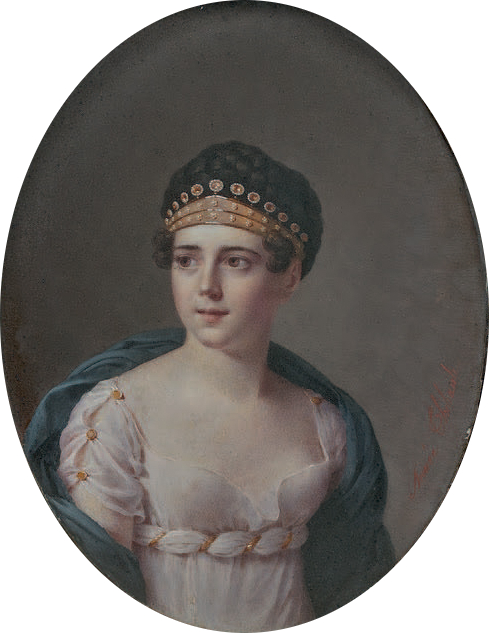
- Portrait of Madame Giacomelli
- Born: February 6, 1779; Paris
- Died: November 11, 1819 (aged 40); 2nd arrondissement of Paris

Sophie Janinet (née Geneviève Sophie Billé; 1779–1819), known after her marriage as Sophie Giacomelli, was a French Neoclassical painter and engraver.

== Sources ==
- Barbin, Madeleine (2003). "Janinet, Jean-François". In Grove Art Online. Oxford University Press. Oxford Art Online.
- Galy, Bérangère (2021). "Giacomelli, Sophie". In Beyer, Andreas; Savoy, Bénédicte; and Tegethoff, Wolf (eds.). Allgemeines Künstlerlexikon Online. De Gruyter.
- "Janinet, Sophie, later Mme Giacomelli". In Benezit Dictionary of Artists. Oxford University Press, Oxford Art Online, 2011.
