= Cesare de' Giacomelli =

Italian Roman Catholic prelate

Most Reverend Cesare de' Giacomelli
- Bishop of Belcastro
- Church: Catholic Church
- Diocese: Diocese of Belcastro
- In office: 1553–1577
- Predecessor: Giacomo de' Giacomelli
- Successor: Giovanni Antonio de Paola

Personal details
- Died: 1577 Rome, Italy

Cesare de' Giacomelli (died 1577) was a Roman Catholic prelate who served as Bishop of Belcastro (1553–1577).

== Biography ==
On 23 January 1553, Cesare de' Giacomelli was appointed during the papacy of Pope Julius III as Bishop of Belcastro. He served as Bishop of Belcastro until his death in 1577 in Rome.

While bishop, he was the principal consecrator of Feliciano Capitone, Archbishop of Avignon (1566); and the principal co-consecrator of Giovanni Battista Ansaldo, Bishop of Cariati e Cerenzia (1576), and Giovanni Bernardino Grandopoli, Bishop of Lettere-Gragnano (1576).

== External links and additional sources ==
- Cheney, David M. "Diocese of Belcastro". Catholic-Hierarchy.org. (for Chronology of Bishops) ^{[self-published]}
- Chow, Gabriel. "Titular Episcopal See of Belcastro (Italy)". GCatholic.org. (for Chronology of Bishops) ^{[self-published]}

Catholic Church titles
Preceded by Giacomo de' Giacomelli	Bishop of Belcastro; 1553–1577	Succeeded by Giovanni Antonio de Paola
