= Raffaele Giacomelli =

Raffaele Giacomelli (5 April 1878, Rome – 13 December 1956, Rome) was an aeronautical engineer, linguist, dialectologist, and historian of science.

His father was Francesco Giacomelli, of Bolognese origin, first astronomer at the R. Osservatorio del Campidoglio, and his mother was Maria née Marucchi, from a family of scholars. Raffaele Giacomelli's paternal great-grandfather, Raffaele, jurist, had been rector of the University of Bologna, and his uncle, Orazio Marucchi, was a famous archaeologist.

After secondary school at liceo Nazareno Roma, he enrolled at the Sapienza University of Rome, where he obtained his degrees in mathematics and natural sciences. After some years of secondary school teaching, he served from 1913 to 1918, with the rank of captain of military engineering, in the aeronautical service at the Italian Air Force base at Vigna di Valle (about 40 kilometers northwest of Rome). From 1920 to 1930 he worked for the central aeronautical institute at the Ministry of Aeronautics as editor-in-chief of technical publications; he was a lecturer, and was later responsible for the library, at the experimental aeronautical institute of Rome. From 1930 to 1940, he was the director of research and development in aeronautics. Giacomelli became in 1928 a libero docente teaching the history of mechanics at the School of Engineering of the Sapienza University of Rome from 1928 to 1948. From 1920 to 1924 he directed and edited the annual publication of the Atti dell'Associazione italiana di aeronautica, which was transformed in 1925 into the journal Aerotecnica, of which he was editor-in-chief from 1925 to 1948.

He was an invited speaker at the International Congress of Mathematicians in 1908 in Rome. The road Via Giacomelli at Vigna di Valle is named in his honor.

== Selected publications ==
- "An Historical Survey of Italian Aeronautics." The Aeronautical Journal 33, no. 226 (1929): 947–964. doi:10.1017/S0368393100137071
- "The aerodynamics of Leonardo da Vinci." The Aeronautical Journal 34, no. 240 (1930): 1016–1038. doi:10.1017/S0368393100113525
- "Flight in Nature and in Science." The Aeronautical Journal 36, no. 259 (1932): 578–597. doi:10.1017/S036839310011212X
- Gli scritti di Leonardo da Vinci sul volo. G. Bardi, 1936; 366 pages, with preface by Cristoforo Ferrari
- Terrorismo aereo nella teoria e nella realtà. Roma : Associazione italiana d'aerotecnica, 1945.
- Bomba atomica e distruzioni in massa. Roma, Editoriale aeronautico, 1947.
  - translated as: Atom bomb and mass destruction. Roma, Editoriale aeronautico, 1947.
