= Argyrargenta =

Scientific classification
- Domain: Eukaryota
- Kingdom: Animalia
- Phylum: Arthropoda
- Class: Insecta
- Order: Lepidoptera
- Superfamily: Noctuoidea
- Family: Noctuidae
- Subfamily: Acontiinae
- Genus: Argyrargenta; Berio, 1939
- Species: A. giacomellii

Binomial name
- Argyrargenta giacomellii Berio, 1939

Genus of moths

Argyrargenta is a monotypic moth genus of the family Noctuidae. Its only species, Argyrargenta giacomellii, is found in Argentina. Both the genus and species were first described by Emilio Berio in 1939.
