= Falerna =

- Comune
- Comune di Falerna
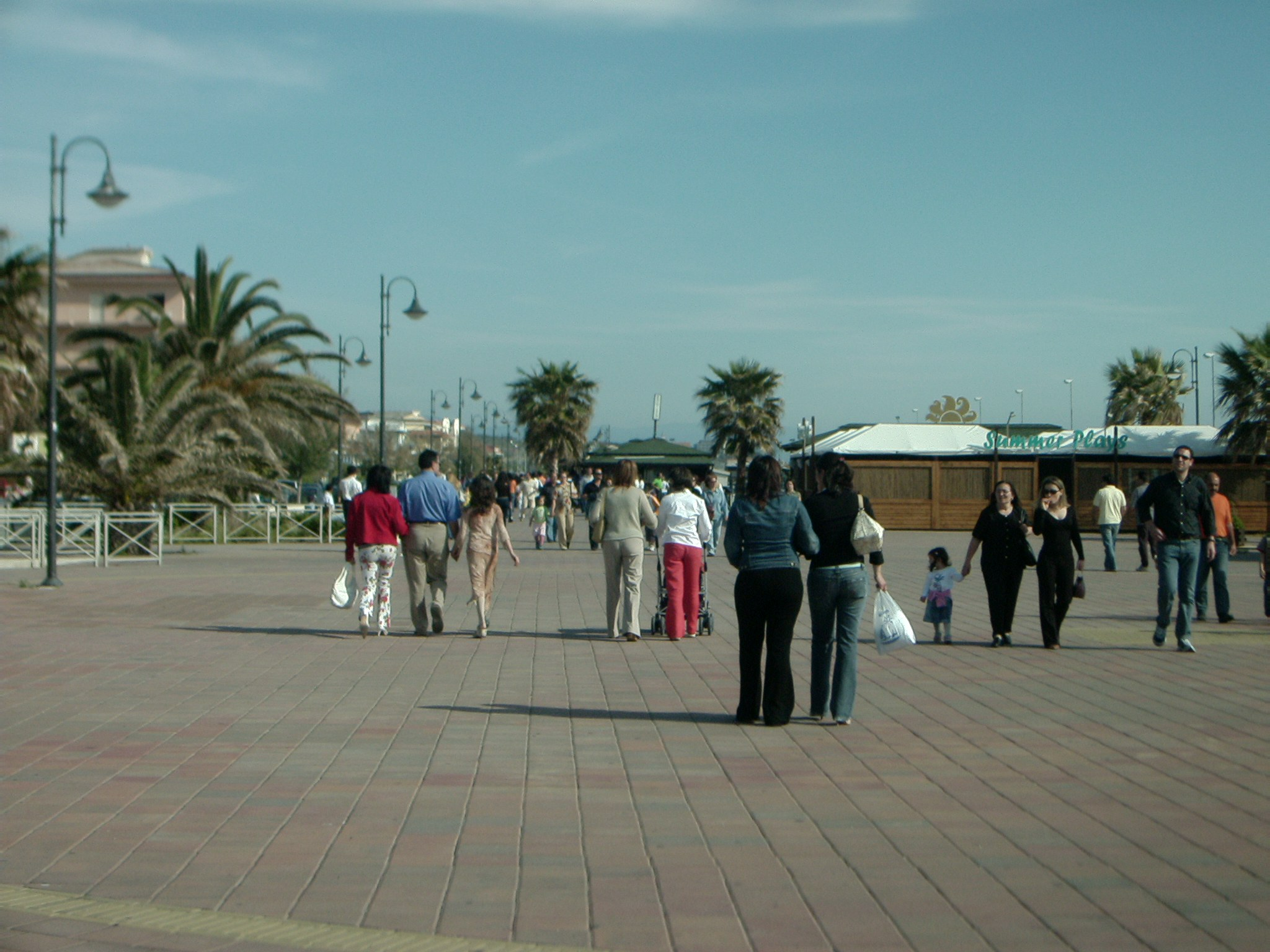

- Coat of arms

- Location within Italy Location within Calabria
- Coordinates: 39°00′08″N 16°10′20″E
- Country: Italy
- Region: Calabria
- Province: Catanzaro (CZ)
- Frazioni: Castiglione Marittimo, Falerna Scalo, Quella Banda Sanguinello

Government
  - Mayor: Francesco Stella

Area
  - Total: 23.85 km^{2} (9.21 sq mi)
- Elevation: 550 m (1,800 ft)

Population (2013)
  - Total: 4,071
  - Density: 170.7/km^{2} (442.1/sq mi)
- Demonym: Falernesi
- Time zone: UTC+1 (CET)
  - Summer (DST): UTC+2 (CEST)
- Postal code: 88042
- Dialing code: 0968
- Patron saint: Thomas Aquinas
- Website: Official website

Falerna (Greek: Phalerne) is a town and comune in the province of Catanzaro, in the Calabria region of southern Italy. It lies on the A3 motorway.

There are two sections of the city. Falerna, the oldest section, lies atop a set of cliffs. Falerna Marina is situated on the seashore and boasts a fine beach and several hotels. Castiglione Marittimo is a "frazione" of the Falerna municipality; it is a former Norman outpost.

Many of Falerna's inhabitants emigrated to the United States, in particular western Pennsylvania, and a few have returned to their home town in retirement. Older residents speak a distinct dialect of Italian known as Falernese. It is dying out as media and schools continue to standardize the Italian language throughout the nation.
