= Antonio Marinari =

Roman Catholic prelate

Most Reverend Antonio Marinari
- Titular Bishop of Thagaste; Auxiliary Bishop of Ostia-Velletri
- Church: Catholic Church
- Archdiocese: Suburbicarian Diocese of Ostia
- In office: 1667–1689
- Predecessor: Giovanni Delfino (iuniore)
- Successor: Emmanuel da Silva Frances

Orders
- Ordination: 8 April 1628
- Consecration: 13 February 1667 by Francesco Barberini

Personal details
- Born: 10 January 1605 Grottaglie, Italy
- Died: 20 August 1689 (age 84)

Antonio Marinari, O. Carm. (10 January 1605 – 20 August 1689) was a Roman Catholic prelate who served as Auxiliary Bishop of Ostia-Velletri (1667–1689) and Titular Bishop of Thagaste (1667–1689).

== Biography ==
Antonio Marinari was born in Grottaglie, Italy on 10 January 1605 and ordained a priest in the Order of Our Lady of Mount Carmel on 8 April 1628. On 7 February 1667, he was appointed during the papacy of Pope Alexander VII as Auxiliary Bishop of Ostia-Velletri and Titular Bishop of Thagaste. On 13 February 1667, he was consecrated bishop by Francesco Barberini, Cardinal-Bishop of Ostia e Velletri, with Joseph-Marie de Suarès, Bishop Emeritus of Vaison, and Persio Caracci, Bishop Emeritus of Larino, serving as co-consecrators. He served as Auxiliary Bishop of Ostia-Velletri until his death on 20 August 1689.

Catholic Church titles
Preceded by	Auxiliary Bishop of Ostia-Velletri; 1667–1689	Succeeded by Giulio Marzi
Preceded by Giovanni Delfino (iuniore)	Titular Bishop of Thagaste; 1667–1689	Succeeded by Emmanuel da Silva Frances
