= Valentino Valentini (bishop) =

Roman catholic prelate (died 1593)

Most Reverend Valentino Valentini
- Bishop of Città Ducale
- Church: Catholic Church
- Diocese: Diocese of Città Ducale
- In office: 1580–1593
- Predecessor: Pompilio Perotti
- Successor: Giovanni Francesco Zagordo

Personal details
- Died: 1593 Città Ducale, Italy

Valentino Valentini (died 1593) was a Roman Catholic prelate who served as Bishop of Città Ducale (1580–1593).

== Biography ==
On 14 November 1580, Valentino Valentini was appointed during the papacy of Pope Gregory XIII as Bishop of Città Ducale. He served as Bishop of Città Ducale until his death in 1593.

== External links and additional sources ==
- Cheney, David M. "Diocese of Città Ducale". Catholic-Hierarchy.org. (for Chronology of Bishops) ^{[self-published]}
- Chow, Gabriel. "Titular Episcopal See of Città Ducale (Italy)". GCatholic.org. (for Chronology of Bishops) ^{[self-published]}

Catholic Church titles
Preceded by Pompilio Perotti	Bishop of Città Ducale; 1580–1593	Succeeded by Giovanni Francesco Zagordo
