= Venner =

Venner may refer to:

- an Early Modern High German term for banneret (modern German Fähnrich)
- a surname:
  - Dominique Venner, French historian, journalist and essayist
  - K. Dwight Venner, governor of the Eastern Caribbean Central Bank
  - Stephen Venner, a bishop of the Church of England
  - Thomas Venner, (beheaded 19 January 1661) was a cooper and rebel
  - Tobias Venner, (1577–1660) English physician and medical writer
  - Venner (Kent cricketer)
  - Charlie Venner, a character in Straw Dogs (1971 film)
  - Elsie Venner, title character of an Oliver Wendell Holmes Sr. novel
- Venner or Struggle for Eagle Peak, a 1960 Norwegian film

== See also ==
- Bamses Venner, Danish musical group
