= Giacomo Ferrari =

Giacomo Ferrari may refer to:

- Giacomo Ferrari (politician), Italian engineer and politician
- Giacomo Ferrari (rugby union), Italian rugby union player
- Giacomo Ferrari (sailor), Italian sailor
- Giacomo Gotifredo Ferrari, Italian composer and singing teacher
