= Roccasecca =

Town and comune in Lazio, Italy

- Comune
- Comune di Roccasecca
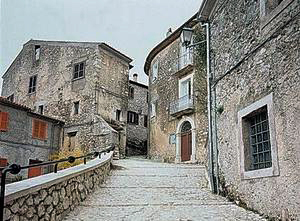
- View of the historical center of Roccasecca.

- Location within Italy Location within Lazio
- Coordinates: 41°33′N 13°40′E
- Country: Italy
- Region: Lazio
- Province: Frosinone (FR)

Area
  - Total: 43 km^{2} (17 sq mi)
- Elevation: 205 m (673 ft)

Population (1 March 2021)
  - Total: 7,043
  - Density: 160/km^{2} (420/sq mi)
- Demonym: Roccaseccani
- Time zone: UTC+1 (CET)
  - Summer (DST): UTC+2 (CEST)
- Postal code: 03038
- Dialing code: 0776
- Website: Official website

Roccasecca is a town and comune in the Province of Frosinone, in the Lazio region of central Italy. It is the birthplace of Thomas Aquinas.

== History ==
The history of Roccasecca is tightly bound to its strategic position, a "dry rocca" at the entrance to two narrow defiles that give access to the Valle di Comino below the slopes of Monte Asprano, whose elevation at 553 metres (1,814 ft) provides a natural position to control the wide Valle del Liri. Remains of archaic perimeter walling attest to an early fortified presence around the site. Roccasecca served as a way station for ancient Roman legions and invading armies crossing the River Melfa, spanned by three ancient bridges there, remains of which still exist. However, the Medieval commune truly began in the early Middle Ages.

It is commonly remembered that St. Thomas Aquinas was born at Roccasecca in 1225, in the castle of his father Landulf, Count of Aquino, which was an important defensive structure that Manso, Abbot of Monte Cassino erected in 994 as part of the outward defenses of the Abbey, it being some kilometres distant. The Abbot entrusted the fortified rocca to a collateral branch of the Counts of Aquino, whose primary seat at Aquino lies 8 kilometres (5 mi) to the south; they retained their custody of the fortification through numerous battles, throughout the centuries.

After the middle of the sixteenth century, some of the inhabitants descended to the valley to erect permanent housing there, giving rise to the frazioni Roccasecca Centro, Castello, and Caprile. In the ensuing centuries the rocca of Roccasecca passed between the Angevin kings of Naples or the Aragonese, in intermittent contention with the Papal States, for the resulting power over the Valle del Liri. Only in 1583 did Roccasecca gain some permanent security, when the Counts of Aquino sold the rights to Giacomo Boncompagni, Duke of Sora, the illegitimate son of Pope Gregory XIII (born Ugo Boncompagni), who made of it for the first time a Papal fief. In the seventeenth century Roccasecca fell with the remainder of southern Italy into Spanish Habsburg control. In the eighteenth century, droughts, disease, and excessive fiscal pressures drastically reduced the number of inhabitants. In the nineteenth century, the illusory Napoleonic promises of liberty were dissolved in Carbonaria and brigandage.

After the unification of Italy in 1860 and the arrival in 1902 of a railroad line to Avezzano that linked Roccasecca with the larger world, emigration to the industrial north and farther abroad became more practical. But the agricultural life of Roccasecca remained unbroken until World War II. The war was a tragic episode: Roccasecca was chosen, due to its rail station and railroad bridge across the Melfa, as the headquarters for the German XIV Panzer Corps under General Fridolin von Senger und Etterlin, with the consequence of repeated Allied bombing, which heavily damaged the commune's population and culminated in a ferocious attack on the rail station.

In the post-war period, reconstruction brought some industry for the first time and modern redevelopment in the demolished area around the restored railroad station.

The seventh centennial of St. Thomas Aquinas' death was honoured with the visit of St. Paul VI on 14 September 1974.
