= Belcastro =

- Comune
- Comune di Belcastro
- Location within Italy Location within Calabria
- Coordinates: 39°1′N 16°47′E
- Country: Italy
- Region: Calabria
- Province: Catanzaro (CZ)
- Frazioni: Fieri di Belcastro

Government
  - Mayor: Maurizio Pace

Area
  - Total: 53.56 km^{2} (20.68 sq mi)
- Elevation: 535 m (1,755 ft)

Population (31 December 2013)
  - Total: 1,397
  - Density: 26.08/km^{2} (67.55/sq mi)
- Demonym: Belcastresi
- Time zone: UTC+1 (CET)
  - Summer (DST): UTC+2 (CEST)
- Postal code: 88050
- Dialing code: 0961
- Patron saint: Thomas Aquinas
- Saint day: 21 March
- Website: Official website

Belcastro (Latin: Bellicastrum; Calabrian: Bercashru) is a comune in the province of Catanzaro, in the Calabria region of southern Italy.

== History ==
The small town of Belcastro is situated on a rocky spur crowned by a Norman-style castle that belonged to the Counts of Aquino. Some propose that it was the birthplace of Saint Thomas Aquinas, more commonly taken to have been born in the castle of Roccasecca, not far from Aquino. A fief for some centuries held by the Lords of Aquino, in 1330 by decree of the King of Naples, Robert of Anjou, it became a county and its name was changed from Geneocastro to Belcastro (Bellicastrum), as a tribute to the beauty of the place and to gratify Tommaso d'Aquino, first count of the city and great-nephew of the saint. In the 15th century it was given the title of city. The historian Lutio d'Orsi (16th and 17th centuries) and jurist Giuseppe Poerio (1775-1843), patriot of the Italian Risorgimento and father of the poet Alessandro Poerio, also a patriot, were born in Belcastro.

Its population is now reduced to about 1400 (2017).
