= Cristofor Segni =

Most Reverend Cristofor Segni
- Titular Archbishop of Thessalonica
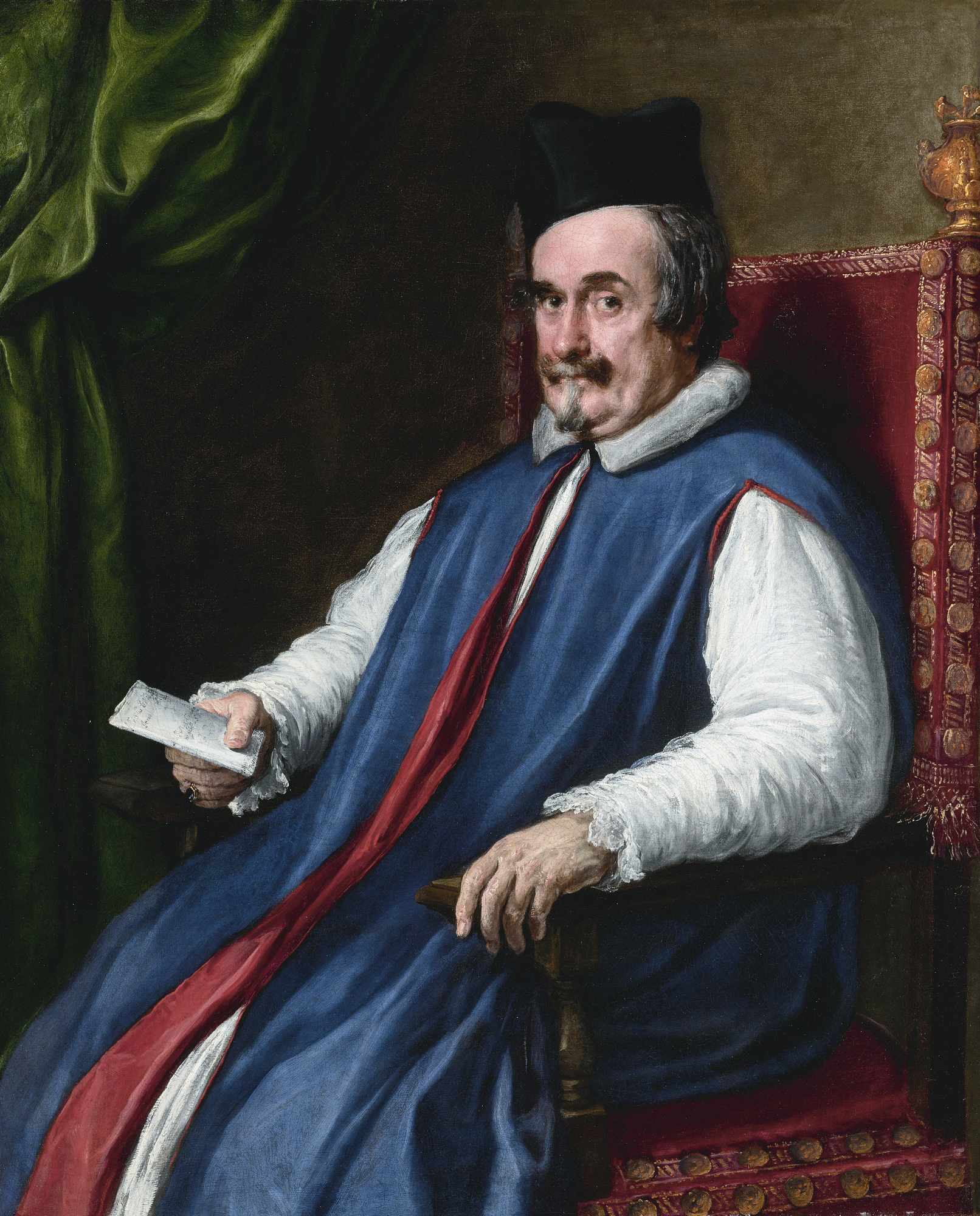
- Church: Catholic Church
- In office: 1645–1661
- Predecessor: Francesco Vitelli
- Successor: Lucas Bueno

Orders
- Consecration: 11 February 1646 by Giovanni Giacomo Panciroli

Personal details
- Born: 1604 Bologna, Italy
- Died: 8 July 1661 (age 57)

Cristofor Segni (1604–1661) was a Roman Catholic prelate who served as Titular Archbishop of Thessalonica (1645–1661).

== Biography ==
Cristofor Segni was born in Bologna, Italy in 1604. On 24 April 1645, he was appointed during the papacy of Pope Innocent X as Titular Archbishop of Thessalonica. On 11 February 1646, he was consecrated bishop by Giovanni Giacomo Panciroli, Cardinal-Priest of Santo Stefano al Monte Celio, with Alfonso Gonzaga, Titular Archbishop of Rhodus, and Girolamo Farnese, Titular Archbishop of Patrae, serving as co-consecrators. He served as Titular Archbishop of Thessalonica until his death on 8 July 1661.

== Episcopal succession ==
While bishop, he was the principal co-consecrator of:

- Alessandro Tassi, Bishop of Terracina, Priverno e Sezze (1646);
- Lorenzo Pollicini, Bishop of Avellino e Frigento (1653);
- Nicolaus Carpenia, Archbishop of Durrës (1657);
- Carlo Roberti de' Vittori, Titular Archbishop of Tarsus (1658); and
- Odoardo Vecchiarelli, Bishop of Rieti (1660).

== External links and additional sources ==
- Cheney, David M. "Thessalonica (Titular See)". Catholic-Hierarchy.org. (for Chronology of Bishops (for Chronology of Bishops) ^{[self-published]}
- Chow, Gabriel. "Titular Metropolitan See of Thessalonica (Greece)". GCatholic.org. (for Chronology of Bishops (for Chronology of Bishops) ^{[self-published]}

Catholic Church titles
Preceded by Francesco Vitelli	Titular Archbishop of Thessalonica; 1645–1661	Succeeded by Lucas Bueno
