= Francesco Maria Febei =

Most Reverend Francesco Maria Febei
- Titular Archbishop of Tarsus
- Church: Catholic Church
- In office: 1667–1680
- Predecessor: Carlo Roberti de' Vittori
- Successor: Ferdinando Strozza

Personal details
- Born: 1616
- Died: 29 November 1680 (age 64)

Francesco Maria Febei (1616 – 29 November 1680) was a Roman Catholic prelate who served as Titular Archbishop of Tarsus (1667–1680).

== Biography ==
Francesco Maria Febei was born in Orvietto, Italy in 1616. On 18 April 1667, he was appointed during the papacy of Pope Alexander VII as Titular Archbishop of Tarsus. He served as Titular Archbishop of Tarsus until his death on 29 November 1680.

== Episcopal succession ==
Episcopal succession of Francesco Maria Febei

While bishop, he was the principal consecrator of:

- Giuseppe Armenj, Bishop of Teramo (1670);
- Carlo Pellegrini (bishop), Bishop of Avellino e Frigento (1673);
- Domenico Sorrentino (bishop), Bishop of Ruvo (1673);

and the principal co-consecrator of:

- Giannotto Gualterio Archbishop of Fermo (1668);
- Giuseppe Eusanio, Titular Bishop of Helenopolis in Bithynia (1670);
- Nestor Rita, Titular Bishop of Zenopolis in Lycia (1670);
- Domenico de' Marini, Titular Archbishop of Teodosia (1670);
- Domenico Gianuzzi, Titular Bishop of Dioclea in Phrygia (1670);
- Francesco Casati, Titular Archbishop of Trapezus (1670); and
- Louis d'Anglure de Bourlemont, Bishop of Fréjus (1679).

He also assisted in the consecration of Giuseppe Maria Sebastiani, Vicar Apostolic of Malabar (1659).

Catholic Church titles
Preceded by Carlo Roberti de' Vittori	Titular Archbishop of Tarsus; 1667–1680	Succeeded by Ferdinando Strozza
