= Setario =

Setario is an Italian surname. Notable people with the surname include:

- Gabriele Setario (fl. 1491–1510), Italian Roman Catholic bishop
- Giovanni Francesco Setario (died 1516), Italian Roman Catholic bishop
