= List of monuments in Marsaskala =

This is a list of monuments in Marsaskala, Malta, which are listed on the National Inventory of the Cultural Property of the Maltese Islands.

== List ==
Name of object	Location	Coordinates	ID	Photo	Upload
Mamo Tower	Triq id-Daħla ta'San Tumas	35°51′21″N 14°33′30″E	00043	Mamo Tower	Upload Photo
Villa Apap Bologna	Triq Sant'Anna	35°51′55″N 14°33′44″E	01179	Villa Apap Bologna	Upload Photo
Villa Glenberg	Triq Sant'Anna	35°51′53″N 14°33′43″E	01180	Villa Glenberg	Upload Photo
St Thomas Tower and Battery	Triq Dawret it-Torri	35°51′40″N 14°34′21″E	01377	St Thomas Tower and Battery	Upload Photo
Riħama Battery	Tal-Munxar, il-Bajja ta'San Tumas	35°50′59″N 14°33′56″E	01385	Riħama Battery	Upload Photo
Marsascala Redoubt	Triq iż-Żonqor	35°51′56″N 14°33′55″E	01424	Marsascala Redoubt	Upload Photo
Wayside Shrine of 3 crosses	Triq il-Bidni	35°52′09″N 14°33′17″E	01722	Wayside Shrine of 3 crosses	Upload Photo
Chapel of the Madonna of Light	Triq il-Bidni	35°52′07″N 14°33′16″E	01723	Chapel of the Madonna of Light	Upload Photo
Parish Church of St Anne	Triq Dun Frans Bianco c/w Triq iż-Żonqor	35°51′57″N 14°33′51″E	01724	Parish Church of St Anne	Upload Photo
Statue of St Anne	Triq Sant'Anna c/w Sqaq San Ġwakkin	35°51′57″N 14°33′46″E	01725	Statue of St Anne	Upload Photo
Niche of St Anthony of Padua	100 Triq Sant'Anna	35°51′55″N 14°33′46″E	01726	Niche of St Anthony of Padua	Upload Photo
Chapel of the Madonna of the Rosary	Triq Sant'Anna	35°51′55″N 14°33′45″E	01727	Chapel of the Madonna of the Rosary	Upload Photo
Niche of St Joseph	23 Triq ix-Xatt	35°51′51″N 14°33′43″E	01728	Niche of St Joseph	Upload Photo
Niche of the Immaculate Conception	Triq ix-Xatt	35°51′50″N 14°33′42″E	01729	Niche of the Immaculate Conception	Upload Photo
Niche of St Joseph	Pjazza Mifsud Bonnici	35°51′47″N 14°33′40″E	01730		Upload Photo
Niche of St Anthony of Padua	88 Triq Sant'Anna	35°51′54″N 14°33′45″E	01731	Niche of St Anthony of Padua	Upload Photo
Niche of St Spiridion	Marine Court, Triq tal-Gardiel	35°51′27″N 14°33′48″E	01732	Niche of St Spiridion	Upload Photo
Niche of St Thomas	Triq tal-Gardiel c/w Triq id-Daħla ta'San Tumas	35°51′26″N 14°33′48″E	01733	Niche of St Thomas	Upload Photo
Crucifix	43 Triq id-Daħla ta'San Tumas	35°51′25″N 14°33′43″E	01734	Crucifix	Upload Photo
Chapel of St Gaetan	Triq id-Daħla ta'San Tumas	35°51′20″N 14°33′27″E	01735	Chapel of St Gaetan	Upload Photo
Niche of the Sacred Heart of Jesus	"Hydra", Triq id-Daħla ta'San Tumas	35°51′21″N 14°33′17″E	01736	Niche of the Sacred Heart of Jesus	Upload Photo
Chapel of St Anthony of Padua	Triq il-Wied	35°51′39″N 14°33′07″E	01737	Chapel of St Anthony of Padua	Upload Photo
Niche of St Vincent Ferreri	1 Triq La Sengle / Triq San Ġwakkin	35°51′59″N 14°33′46″E	01738	Niche of St Vincent Ferreri	Upload Photo
Niche of St. Andrew	12-13 Triq San Ġwakkin	35°51′58″N 14°33′46″E	01739	Niche of St. Andrew	Upload Photo
Old Parish Church of St Anne	15 Triq La Sengle	35°51′59″N 14°33′44″E	01740	Old Parish Church of St Anne	Upload Photo
Chapel of St Nicholas	off Triq il-Blajjiet (Note: This chapel is erroneously also listed as NICPMI Inv. No. 2102 (see List of monuments in Żabbar).)	35°52′25″N 14°33′43″E	01741	Chapel of St Nicholas	Upload Photo
Chapel of Our Lady of the Girdle	29-30 Triq iż-Żonqor	35°51′55″N 14°33′53″E	01742	Chapel of Our Lady of the Girdle	Upload Photo
Empty Niche	Triq id-Daħla ta'San Tumas	35°51′23″N 14°33′06″E	01743	Empty Niche	Upload Photo
Niche of the Madonna	Triq id-Daħla ta'San Tumas	35°51′19″N 14°33′19″E	01744	Niche of the Madonna	Upload Photo
