= Zenopolis =

Zenopolis or Zenoupolis (Ancient Greek: Ζηνούπολις) or Zenonopolis (Ζηνωνόπολις, "city of Zeno) is a name given to at least three cities of the Roman Empire in Late Antiquity:

- Zenopolis (Isauria), near present-day Elmayurdu, Turkey
- Zenopolis (Lycia), Turkey
- Zenopolis (Phoenicia), near present-day Damascus, Syria
