= Nestor Rita =

Roman Catholic prelate (1605-87)

Most Reverend Nestor Rita
- Titular Archbishop of Sebaste in Cilicia
- Church: Catholic Church
- In office: 1667–80
- Predecessor: Johann Sternenberg
- Successor: Iosif Ioan de Camillis
- Previous post: Titular Bishop of Zenopolis in Lycia (1669-1670)

Orders
- Consecration: 18 May 1670 by Pietro Vidoni

Personal details
- Born: 1605
- Died: 17 March 1687 (age 82)

Nestor Rita (1605 – 17 March 1687) was a Roman Catholic prelate who served as Titular Archbishop of Sebaste in Cilicia (1670–87) and Titular Bishop of Zenopolis in Lycia (1669–70).

== Biography ==
Nestor Rita was born in 1605. On 2 December 1669, he was appointed during the papacy of Pope Clement IX as Titular Archbishop of Zenopolis in Lycia. On 18 May 1670, he was consecrated bishop by Pietro Vidoni, Cardinal-Priest of San Callisto, with Federico Baldeschi Colonna, Titular Archbishop of Caesarea in Cappadocia, and Francesco Maria Febei, Titular Archbishop of Tarsus, serving as co-consecrators. On 20 August 1670, he was appointed during the papacy of Pope Clement X as Titular Archbishop of Sebaste in Cilicia. He served as Titular Archbishop of Sebaste in Cilicia until his death on 29 November 1680.

Catholic Church titles
Preceded by	Titular Bishop of Zenopolis in Lycia; 1669–1670	Succeeded by Juan Durán (bishop)
Preceded by Johann Sternenberg	Titular Archbishop of Sebaste in Cilicia; 1670–1687	Succeeded by Iosif Ioan de Camillis
