= Roman Catholic Diocese of Sant' Angelo de' Lombardi-Bisaccia =

Former Catholic Diocese

The former Italian Catholic Diocese of Sant'Angelo dei Lombardi-Bisaccia, in the Province of Avellino, Southern Italy, existed until 1921, when it was united into the Archdiocese of Conza-Campagna to form the Archdiocese of Conza-Sant'Angelo dei Lombardi-Bisaccia.

== History ==
The Diocese of Sant' Angelo de' Lombardi was created under Pope Gregory VII, but its first known bishop is Thomas, in 1179, when the see was a suffragan of the archdiocese of Conza. In 1540 under the episcopate of Rinaldo de' Cancellieri, it was united to the Diocese of Bisaccia (the ancient Romulea); it appears first as a bishopric in 1179. Another of its prelates, Ignazio Cianti, O.P. (1646), was distinguished for his learning. In 1664 the see was almost completely destroyed.

In 1818 it was incorporated with the See of Monteverde, the earliest known bishop of which is Mario (1049), and which in 1531 was united to the Archdiocese of Canne and Nazareth, from which it was later separated.

== Bishops ==
=== Diocese of Sant'Angelo dei Lombardi ===
Erected: 12th Century
Latin Name: Sancti Angeli de Lombardis

- Pietro dell'Aquila (12 Feb 1347 – 30 May 1348 Appointed, Bishop of Trivento)

...

- Pietro Janatella (13 Oct 1427 – 1447 Resigned)

...

- Giacomo, O.S.A. (3 Aug 1468 – 15 Jan 1477 Died)

...

- Edoardo Ferro (12 Aug 1485 – 1491 Died)
- Biagio de Locha (23 Jan 1492 – )
- Rainaldo Cancellieri (16 Dec 1502 – 23 Dec 1517 Resigned)

=== Diocese of Sant’Angelo dei Lombardi e Bisaccia ===
United: 23 December 1517 with the Diocese of Bisaccia
Latin Name: Sancti Angeli de Lombardis et Bisaciensis
Metropolitan: Archdiocese of Conza

- Nicola Volpe (23 Dec 1517 – 1540 Died)
- Valerio Cancellieri (11 Oct 1542 – 1574 Died)
- Pietrantonio Vicedomini (17 Nov 1574 – 4 Nov 1580 Appointed, Bishop of Avellino e Frigento)
- Giovanni Battista Pietralata (12 Dec 1580 – 1585 Resigned)
- Antonello de Folgore (27 Nov 1585 – 1590 Died)
- Flaminio Torricella (30 Jan 1591 – 1600 Died)
- Gaspare Paluzzi degli Albertoni (4 Apr 1601 – 1614 Died)
- Francesco Diotallevi (21 Jul 1614 – 1622 Died)
- Ercole Rangoni (archbishop) (2 May 1622 – 24 Apr 1645 Appointed, Archbishop of Conza)
- Gregorio Coppino, O.S.B. (12 Jun 1645 – Oct 1645 Died)
- Alessandro Salzilla (12 May 1646 – Nov 1646 Died)
- Ignazio Ciantes, O.P. (7 Jan 1647 – Feb 1661 Resigned)
- Tommaso de Rosa (16 Jan 1662 – 8 May 1679 Appointed, Bishop of Policastro)
- Giovanni Battista Nepita (8 Jan 1680 – 26 Mar 1685 Appointed, Bishop of Massa Lubrense)
- Giuseppe Mastellone (14 May 1685 – Jun 1721 Died)
- Giuseppe Galliani (1 Dec 1721 – Apr 1727 Died)
- Angelo Maria Nappi, O.S.M. (25 Jun 1727 – 29 Jan 1735 Died)
- Antonio Manerba (Malerba) (25 May 1735 – Sep 1761 Died)
- Domenico Volpe (25 Jan 1762 – 12 Mar 1783 Died)
- Carlo Nicodemi (26 Mar 1792 Confirmed – 2 Mar 1808 Died)

Territory Added: 1818 from the suppressed Diocese of Monteverde

- Bartolomeo Goglia (21 Dec 1818 Confirmed – 20 Apr 1840 Died)
- Ferdinando Girardi, C.M. (22 Jul 1842 Confirmed – 21 Dec 1846 Confirmed, Bishop of Nardò)
- Giuseppe Gennaro Romano (21 Dec 1846 Confirmed – 17 Jun 1854 Resigned)
- Giuseppe Maria Fanelli (23 Jun 1854 Confirmed – 8 Jun 1891 Died)
- Nicola Lorusso (8 Jun 1891 Succeeded – 9 Apr 1897 Died)
- Giulio Tommasi (19 Apr 1897 – 30 Sep 1921 Appointed, Archbishop of Conza-Sant'Angelo dei Lombardi-Bisaccia)

30 September 1921: United with the Archdiocese of Conza e Campagna to form the Archdiocese of Conza-Sant'Angelo dei Lombardi-Bisaccia
