= List of monuments in Żabbar =

This is a list of monuments in Żabbar, Malta, which are listed on the National Inventory of the Cultural Property of the Maltese Islands.

== List ==
Name of object	Location	Coordinates	ID	Photo	Upload
Hompesch Gate	Triq il-Mina ta' Hompesch	35°52′19″N 14°31′38″E	00006	Hompesch Gate	Upload Photo
Triq il-Wiesgħa Tower	E from Fort Leonardo	35°52′41″N 14°33′51″E	01384	Triq il-Wiesgħa Tower	Upload Photo
Xgħajra Entrenchment -Ricasoli to Żonqor Point	from Ricasoli to Żonqor Point	35°52′45″N 14°33′47″E	01426		Upload Photo
Niche of the Holy Mother and Child	Żabbar Gate	35°52′49″N 14°31′46″E	02058	Niche of the Holy Mother and Child	Upload Photo
Niche of the Holy Mother and Child	Sqaq Sidtna tal-Mirakli c/w 100 Triq il-Kbira	35°52′39″N 14°31′59″E	02059	Niche of the Holy Mother and Child	Upload Photo
Niche of the Madonna of Mount Carmel	12 Triq L-Immakulata Kunċizzjoni	35°52′35″N 14°32′02″E	02060	Niche of the Madonna of Mount Carmel	Upload Photo
Niche of the Madonna of Graces	23 Triq L-Immakulata Kunċizzjoni	35°52′35″N 14°32′02″E	02061	Niche of the Madonna of Graces	Upload Photo
Niche of the Madonna of Mount Carmel	Sqaq San Vincenz	35°52′36″N 14°32′05″E	02062	Niche of the Madonna of Mount Carmel	Upload Photo
Niche of the Madonna of Graces	190 Triq il-Kbira c/w Sqaq il-Wied	35°52′35″N 14°32′05″E	02063	Niche of the Madonna of Graces	Upload Photo
Niche of the Madonna of Graces	38 Triq is-Santwarju c/w 38 Triq il-Kbira	35°52′32″N 14°32′08″E	02064	Niche of the Madonna of Graces	Upload Photo
Niche of St. Francis	Triq il-Kbira c/w Triq San Duminku	35°52′31″N 14°32′10″E	02065	Niche of St. Francis	Upload Photo
Niche of the Madonna of Graces	12/13 Triq il-Kbira	35°52′30″N 14°32′12″E	02066	Niche of the Madonna of Graces	Upload Photo
Niche of St Anthony	1 Triqil-Kbira c/w Misraħ is-Sliem	35°52′29″N 14°32′13″E	02067	Niche of St Anthony	Upload Photo
Niche of St Paul	6 Misraħ is-Sliem c/w Sqaq San Pawl	35°52′29″N 14°32′16″E	02068	Niche of St Paul	Upload Photo
Niche of St Joseph	Misraħ San Ġakbu c/w Sqaq	35°52′30″N 14°32′16″E	02069	Niche of St Joseph	Upload Photo
Statue of the Immaculate Conception	Misraħ San Ġakbu	35°52′30″N 14°32′18″E	02070	Statue of the Immaculate Conception	Upload Photo
Niche of the Madonna of Graces	Misraħ San Ġakbu c/w Triq ix-Xgħajra	35°52′32″N 14°32′19″E	02071	Niche of the Madonna of Graces	Upload Photo
Niche of the Crucifix	30 Triq Santa Marija	35°52′25″N 14°32′19″E	02072	Niche of the Crucifix	Upload Photo
Chapel of St Mary	Triq Santa Marija	35°52′26″N 14°32′20″E	02073	Chapel of St Mary	Upload Photo
Niche of the Madonna of Graces	38 Triq Santa Marija	35°52′24″N 14°32′20″E	02074	Niche of the Madonna of Graces	Upload Photo
Niche of the Madonna of Sorrows	54 Triq Bajada c/w 58 Triq G. Agius Muscat	35°52′26″N 14°32′09″E	02075	Niche of the Madonna of Sorrows	Upload Photo
Church of the Annunciation	Triq il-Kbira	35°52′33″N 14°32′08″E	02076	Church of the Annunciation	Upload Photo
Parish Church of the Madonna of Graces	Triq is-Santwarju	35°52′29″N 14°32′03″E	02077	Parish Church of the Madonna of Graces	Upload Photo
Niche of St Joseph	Triq is-Santwarju c/w 120 Triq G. Agius Muscat	35°52′30″N 14°32′05″E	02078	Niche of St Joseph	Upload Photo
Niche of St Paul	Triq is-Santwarju (on the right in front of the church)	35°52′30″N 14°32′04″E	02079	Niche of St Paul	Upload Photo
Niche of St. Peter	Triq is-Santwarju (on the left in front of the church)	35°52′30″N 14°32′05″E	02080	Niche of St. Peter	Upload Photo
Niche of Pope Alexander VII	Misraħ tal-Madonna Medjatriċi	35°52′30″N 14°32′01″E	02081	Niche of Pope Alexander VII	Upload Photo
Niche of the Holy Mother and Child	76 Triq G. Agius Muscat c/w Triq il-Baruni	35°52′27″N 14°32′08″E	02082	Niche of the Holy Mother and Child	Upload Photo
Niche of the Holy Mother and Child	78 Triq G. Agius Muscat	35°52′27″N 14°32′08″E	02083	Niche of the Holy Mother and Child	Upload Photo
Niche of the Madonna of the army	94 Triq Bajada	35°52′25″N 14°32′05″E	02084	Niche of the Madonna of the army	Upload Photo
Niche of St Joseph	101 Triq Bajada	35°52′24″N 14°32′03″E	02085	Niche of St Joseph	Upload Photo
Niche of St Joseph	Triq Sant'Antnin c/w Triq San Ġużepp	35°52′18″N 14°32′15″E	02086	Niche of St Joseph	Upload Photo
Niche of the Madonna of Graces	209 Triq Santa Duminka c/w Triq il-Biċċieni	35°52′45″N 14°32′03″E	02087	Niche of the Madonna of Graces	Upload Photo
Niche of St Joseph	Triq il-Biċċieni c/w Sqaq Nru. 5	35°52′42″N 14°32′02″E	02088	Niche of St Joseph	Upload Photo
Niche of the Madonna of Sorrows	Triq il-Biċċieni c/w Sqaq Nru. 5	35°52′42″N 14°32′02″E	02089	Niche of the Madonna of Sorrows	Upload Photo
Niche of the Madonna of Sorrows	Triq il-Biċċieni	35°52′41″N 14°32′02″E	02090	Niche of the Madonna of Sorrows	Upload Photo
Niche of Christ the Saviour	126 Triq is-Santwarju	35°52′35″N 14°32′14″E	02091	Niche of Christ the Saviour	Upload Photo
Niche of St Joseph	21 Triq San Duminku c/w Triq il-Grazzji	35°52′34″N 14°32′13″E	02092	Niche of St Joseph	Upload Photo
Niche of the Crucifix	Triq Wied il-Għajn c/w Sqaq tal-Għargħar	35°52′20″N 14°33′10″E	02093		Upload Photo
Niche of the Madonna of Graces	53 Triq Strickland c/w 110 Triq Feliċe	35°52′36″N 14°32′21″E	02094	Niche of the Madonna of Graces	Upload Photo
Niche of St Nicholas of Bari	Misraħ San Nikola (opposite Triq is-Santwarju)	35°52′41″N 14°32′27″E	02095	Niche of St Nicholas of Bari	Upload Photo
Niche of St. Rita	"St Rita House", 280 Triq is-Santwarju	35°52′41″N 14°32′26″E	02096	Niche of St. Rita	Upload Photo
Niche of the Sacred Heart of Jesus	"Begonja", 161 Triq il-Kunvent	35°52′44″N 14°32′25″E	02097	Niche of the Sacred Heart of Jesus	Upload Photo
Niche of the Madonna of Mount Carmel	69 Triq il-Karmnu c/w Triq Lija	35°52′45″N 14°32′18″E	02098	Niche of the Madonna of Mount Carmel	Upload Photo
Niche of the Sacred Heart of Jesus	"Casa Cuore di Gesu", 103 Triq il-Qalb Imqaddsa	35°52′42″N 14°32′24″E	02099	Niche of the Sacred Heart of Jesus	Upload Photo
Niche of the Madonna of Lourdes	408 Triq ix-Xgħajra	35°52′59″N 14°32′31″E	02100	Niche of the Madonna of Lourdes	Upload Photo
Chapel of St James	Triq il-Knisja c/w Triq Sant'Elija, Xgħajra	35°53′10″N 14°32′46″E	02101	Chapel of St James	Upload Photo
Chapel of St Nicholas	off Triq il-Blajjiet, Marsaskala (Note: This seems to be an error since the same chapel is also listed as NICPMI Inv. No. 1741 (see List of monuments in Marsaskala).)	35°52′25″N 14°33′43″E	02102	Chapel of St Nicholas	Upload Photo
Chapel of the Cross	91 Triq Alessio Erardi	35°52′52″N 14°32′23″E	02103	Chapel of the Cross	Upload Photo
Chapel of the Madonna of Montpellier	Triq Latmija	35°52′16″N 14°32′30″E	02104	Chapel of the Madonna of Montpellier	Upload Photo
Chapel of Sta. Domenica and St Andrew	Triq Alessio Erardi	35°52′51″N 14°32′21″E	02105	Chapel of Sta. Domenica and St Andrew	Upload Photo
