= Pietrantonio Vicedomini =

Roman Catholic prelate

Most Reverend Pietrantonio Vicedomini
- Bishop of Avellino e Frigento
- Church: Catholic Church
- Diocese: Diocese of Avellino
- In office: 1580–1591
- Predecessor: Ascanio Albertini
- Successor: Fulvio Passerini

Pietrantonio Vicedomini was a Roman Catholic prelate who served as Bishop of Avellino e Frigento (1580–1591) and Bishop of Sant'Angelo dei Lombardi e Bisaccia (1574–1580).

== Biography ==
On 17 November 1574, Pietrantonio Vicedomini was appointed during the papacy of Pope Gregory XIII as Bishop of Sant'Angelo dei Lombardi e Bisaccia. On 4 November 1580, he was appointed during the papacy of Pope Gregory XIII as Bishop of Avellino e Frigento. He served as Bishop of Avellino e Frigento until his resignation in 1591.

== External links and additional sources ==
- Cheney, David M. "Diocese of Sant'Angelo dei Lombardi e Bisaccia". Catholic-Hierarchy.org. (for Chronology of Bishops) ^{[self-published]}
- Chow, Gabriel. "Archdiocese of Sant'Angelo dei Lombardi–Conza–Nusco–Bisaccia". GCatholic.org. (for Chronology of Bishops) ^{[self-published]}
- Cheney, David M. "Diocese of Avellino". Catholic-Hierarchy.org. (for Chronology of Bishops) ^{[self-published]}
- Chow, Gabriel. "Diocese of Avellino (Italy)". GCatholic.org. (for Chronology of Bishops) ^{[self-published]}

Catholic Church titles
Preceded by Valerio Cancellieri	Bishop of Sant'Angelo dei Lombardi e Bisaccia; 1574–1580	Succeeded by Giovanni Battista Pietralata
Preceded by Ascanio Albertini	Bishop of Avellino e Frigento; 1580–1591	Succeeded by Fulvio Passerini
