= Nicola Volpe =

Roman Catholic prelate

Most Reverend Nicola Volpe
- Bishop of Sant'Angelo dei Lombardi e Bisaccia
- Church: Catholic Church
- Diocese: Diocese of Sant'Angelo dei Lombardi e Bisaccia
- In office: 1517–1540
- Predecessor: Rainaldo Cancellieri
- Successor: Valerio Cancellieri

Personal details
- Died: 1540

Nicola Volpe (died 1540) was a Roman Catholic prelate who served as Bishop of Sant'Angelo dei Lombardi e Bisaccia (1517–1540).

On 23 December 1517, Nicola Volpe was appointed during the papacy of Pope Leo X as Bishop of Sant'Angelo dei Lombardi e Bisaccia. He served as Bishop of Sant'Angelo dei Lombardi e Bisaccia until his death in 1540.

== External links and additional sources ==
- Cheney, David M. "Diocese of Sant'Angelo dei Lombardi e Bisaccia". Catholic-Hierarchy.org. (for Chronology of Bishops) ^{[self-published]}
- Chow, Gabriel. "Archdiocese of Sant'Angelo dei Lombardi–Conza–Nusco–Bisaccia". GCatholic.org. (for Chronology of Bishops) ^{[self-published]}

Catholic Church titles
Preceded by Rainaldo Cancellieri	Bishop of Sant'Angelo dei Lombardi e Bisaccia; 1517–1540	Succeeded by Valerio Cancellieri
