= Roman Catholic Diocese of Frigento =

The Diocese of Frigento (Latin: Dioecesis Frequentina) was a Roman Catholic diocese located in the town of Frigento in the province of Avellino, Campania, Italy. In 1466, it was united with the Diocese of Avellino to form the Diocese of Avellino e Frigento. It was restored as a Titular Episcopal See in 1970.

== Ordinaries ==
- Battista de Ventura (1455–1465 Appointed, Bishop of Avellino e Frigento)

== See also ==
- Catholic Church in Italy
