= Carlo Pellegrini (bishop) =

Italian Roman Catholic prelate

Most Reverend Carlo Pellegrini
- Bishop of Avellino e Frigento
- Church: Catholic Church
- Diocese: Diocese of Avellino e Frigento
- In office: 1673–1678
- Predecessor: Giovanni Battista Lanfranchi
- Successor: Francesco Scannagatta

Orders
- Consecration: 16 April 1673 by Francesco Maria Febei

Personal details
- Born: 1613 Castrovillari, Italy
- Died: 3 May 1678 (age 65) Avellino, Italy

Carlo Pellegrini (1613 – 3 May 1678) was a Roman Catholic prelate who served as Bishop of Avellino e Frigento (1673–1678).

== Biography ==
In 1613, Carlo Pellegrini was born in Castrovillari, Italy. On 13 March 1673, he was appointed during the papacy of Pope Clement X as Bishop of Avellino e Frigento. On 16 April 1673, he was consecrated bishop by Francesco Maria Febei, Titular Archbishop of Tarsus, with Pier Antonio Capobianco, Bishop Emeritus of Lacedonia, and Giuseppe di Giacomo, Bishop of Bovino, serving as co-consecrators. He served as Bishop of Avellino e Frigento until his death on 3 May 1678.

== External links and additional sources ==
- Cheney, David M. "Diocese of Avellino". Catholic-Hierarchy.org. (for Chronology of Bishops) ^{[self-published]}
- Chow, Gabriel. "Diocese of Avellino (Italy)". GCatholic.org. (for Chronology of Bishops) ^{[self-published]}

Catholic Church titles
Preceded by Giovanni Battista Lanfranchi	Bishop of Avellino e Frigento; 1673–1678	Succeeded by Francesco Scannagatta
