= Arcangelo Madrignano =

Roman Catholic prelate

Most Reverend Arcangelo Madrignano
- Bishop of Avellino e Frigento
- Church: Catholic Church
- Diocese: Diocese of Avellino e Frigento
- In office: 1516–1520
- Predecessor: Giovanni Francesco Setario
- Successor: Silvio Messaglia

Personal details
- Died: 1529

Arcangelo Madrignano (died 1529) was a Roman Catholic prelate who served as Bishop of Avellino e Frigento (1510–1516).

== Biography ==
On 18 August 1516, Arcangelo Madrignano was appointed during the papacy of Pope Leo X as Bishop of Avellino e Frigento. He served as Bishop of Avellino e Frigento until his resignation on 28 March 1520. He died in 1529.

== External links and additional sources ==
- Cheney, David M. "Diocese of Avellino". Catholic-Hierarchy.org. (for Chronology of Bishops) ^{[self-published]}
- Chow, Gabriel. "Diocese of Avellino (Italy)". GCatholic.org. (for Chronology of Bishops) ^{[self-published]}

Catholic Church titles
Preceded by Giovanni Francesco Setario	Bishop of Avellino e Frigento; 1516–1520	Succeeded by Silvio Messaglia
