= Muzio Cinquini =

Most Reverend Muzio Cinquini
- Bishop Emeritus of Avellino e Frigento
- Church: Catholic Church
- Diocese: Diocese of Avellino e Frigento
- In office: 1609–1627
- Predecessor: Tommaso Vannini
- Successor: Bartolomeo Giustiniani

Personal details
- Died: 10 April 1627

Muzio Cinquini (died 1627) was a Roman Catholic prelate who served as Bishop of Avellino e Frigento (1609–1627).

== Biography ==
On 10 June 1609, Muzio Cinquini was appointed during the papacy of Pope Paul V as Bishop of Avellino e Frigento. He served as Bishop of Avellino e Frigento until his resignation on 15 December 1625. He died on 10 April 1627.

While bishop, he was the principal co-consecrator of Bernardino Piccoli, Titular Archbishop of Nicaea and Coadjutor Bishop of Strongoli.

== External links and additional sources ==
- Cheney, David M. "Diocese of Avellino". Catholic-Hierarchy.org. (for Chronology of Bishops) ^{[self-published]}
- Chow, Gabriel. "Diocese of Avellino (Italy)". GCatholic.org. (for Chronology of Bishops) ^{[self-published]}

Catholic Church titles
| Preceded by Tommaso Vannini | Bishop of Avellino e Frigento; 1609–1627 | Succeeded by Bartolomeo Giustiniani |
