= Geronimo Albertini =

Bishop of Avellino e Frigento from 1545 to 1548

Most Reverend Geronimo Albertini
- Bishop of Avellino e Frigento
- Church: Catholic Church
- Diocese: Diocese of Avellino e Frigento
- In office: 1545–1548
- Predecessor: Silvio Messaglia
- Successor: Bartolomé de la Cueva y Toledo

Geronimo Albertini was a Roman Catholic prelate who served as Bishop of Avellino e Frigento (1545–1548).

== Biography ==
On 19 January 1545, Geronimo Albertini was appointed during the papacy of Pope Paul III as Bishop of Avellino e Frigento. He served as Bishop of Avellino e Frigento until his resignation in 1548.

== See also ==
- Catholic Church in Italy

== External links and additional sources ==
- Cheney, David M. "Diocese of Avellino". Catholic-Hierarchy.org. (for Chronology of Bishops) ^{[self-published]}
- Chow, Gabriel. "Diocese of Avellino (Italy)". GCatholic.org. (for Chronology of Bishops) ^{[self-published]}

Catholic Church titles
Preceded by Silvio Messaglia	Bishop of Avellino e Frigento; 1545–1548	Succeeded by Bartolomé de la Cueva y Toledo
