= Antonio de Caro =

Most Reverend Antonio de Caro
- Bishop of Nardò
- Church: Catholic Church
- Diocese: Diocese of Nardò
- In office: 1507–1517
- Predecessor: Gabriele Setario
- Successor: Luigi d'Aragona
- Previous post: Bishop of Avellino e Frigento (1505–1507)

Personal details
- Died: 1517 Nardò, Italy

Antonio de Caro (died 1517) was a Roman Catholic prelate who served as Bishop of Nardò (1507–1517) and Bishop of Avellino e Frigento (1505–1507).

== Biography ==
In 1505, Antonio de Caro was appointed during the papacy of Pope Julius II as Bishop of Avellino e Frigento. On 27 October 1507, he was appointed during the papacy of Pope Julius II as Bishop of Nardò. He served as Bishop of Nardò until his death in 1517.

== External links and additional sources ==
- Cheney, David M. "Diocese of Avellino". Catholic-Hierarchy.org. (for Chronology of Bishops) ^{[self-published]}
- Chow, Gabriel. "Diocese of Avellino (Italy)". GCatholic.org. (for Chronology of Bishops) ^{[self-published]}
- Cheney, David M. "Diocese of Nardò-Gallipoli". Catholic-Hierarchy.org. (for Chronology of Bishops) ^{[self-published]}
- Chow, Gabriel. "Diocese of Nardò-Gallipoli (Italy)". GCatholic.org.(for Chronology of Bishops) ^{[self-published]}

Catholic Church titles
Preceded by Bernardino López de Carvajal y Sande	Bishop of Avellino e Frigento; 1505–1507	Succeeded by Gabriele Setario
Preceded by Gabriele Setario	Bishop of Nardò; 1507–1517	Succeeded by Luigi d'Aragona
