= Carlo Roberti de' Vittori =

Italian cardinal (1605–1673)

His Eminence Carlo Roberti de' Vittori
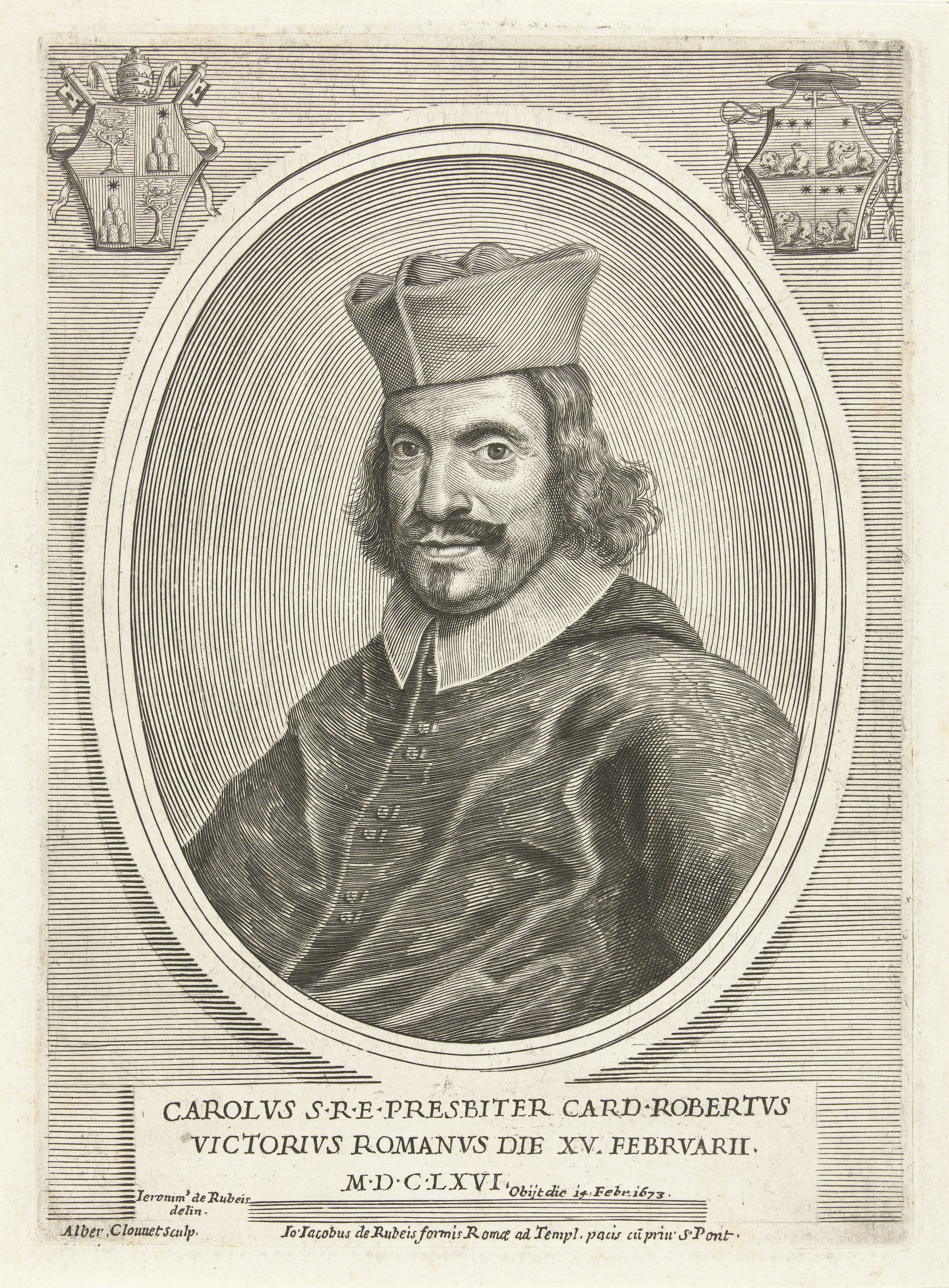
- Church: Catholic Church

Orders
- Consecration: 8 Dec 1658 by Giulio Rospigliosi

Personal details
- Born: 1605 Rome, Italy
- Died: 14 Feb 1673 (age 68)
- Denomination: catholic

Carlo Roberti de' Vittori (1605–1673) was a Roman Catholic cardinal.

== Biography ==
On 8 Dec 1658, he was consecrated bishop by Giulio Rospigliosi, Cardinal-Priest of San Sisto Vecchio, with Cristofor Segni, Titular Archbishop of Thessalonica, and Marcantonio Oddi, Titular Bishop of Hierapolis in Isauria, serving as co-consecrators.

While bishop, he was the principal consecrator of: Jean d'Arenthon d'Alex, Bishop of Geneva (1661); and Giovanni Stefano Sanarica (Senarega), Bishop of Conversano (1671).

== External links and additional sources ==
- Cheney, David M. "Nunciature to France". Catholic-Hierarchy.org. (for Chronology of Bishops) ^{[self-published]}
- Chow, Gabriel. "Apostolic Nunciature France". GCatholic.org. (for Chronology of Bishops) ^{[self-published]}

Catholic Church titles
Preceded by Giulio Rospigliosi	Titular Archbishop of Tarsus; 1658–1667	Succeeded by Francesco Maria Febei
Preceded by Alessandro Crescenzi (cardinal)	Apostolic Nuncio to Savoy; 1659–1664	Succeeded by Niccolo Pietro Bargellini
Preceded by Celio Piccolomini	Apostolic Nuncio to France; 1664–1667	Succeeded by Michele Antonio Vibò
Preceded by Ascanio Filomarino	Cardinal-Priest of Santa Maria in Ara Coeli; 1667–1673	Succeeded by Giacomo Franzoni
