= Gerolamo de Caro =

Most Reverend Gerolamo de Caro
- Titular Archbishop Emeritus of Nazareth
- Church: Catholic Church
- In office: 1536–1552
- Predecessor: Filippo Adimari
- Successor: Bernardino Figueroa
- Previous posts: Bishop of Monteverde (1521–1531); Titular Bishop of Cannae(1531–1536)

Personal details
- Died: 8 November 1560

Gerolamo de Caro (died 1560) was a Roman Catholic prelate who served as Titular Archbishop of Nazareth (1536–1552), Titular Bishop of Cannae (1531–1536), and Bishop of Monteverde (1521–1531).

== Biography ==
On 3 Mar 1521, Gerolamo de Caro was appointed during the papacy of Pope Leo X as Bishop of Monteverde. On 3 Jul 1531, he was appointed during the papacy of Pope Clement VII as Titular Bishop of Cannae. In Nov 1536, he was appointed during the papacy of Pope Paul III as Titular Archbishop of Nazareth. He served as Titular Archbishop of Nazareth until his resignation on 16 Feb 1552. He died on 8 Nov 1560.

== External links and additional sources ==
- Cheney, David M. "Nazareth (Titular See)". Catholic-Hierarchy.org. (for Chronology of Bishops) ^{[self-published]}
- Chow, Gabriel. "Titular Metropolitan See of Nazareth". GCatholic.org. (for Chronology of Bishops) ^{[self-published]}

Catholic Church titles
Preceded by	Bishop of Monteverde; 1521–1531	Succeeded by
Preceded by	Titular Bishop of Cannae; 1531–1536	Succeeded by
Preceded by Filippo Adimari	Titular Archbishop of Nazareth; 1536–1552	Succeeded by Bernardino Figueroa
