= Roman Catholic Diocese of Monteverde =

Historical diocese in Italy

The Diocese of Monteverde (Latin: Dioecesis Montis Viridis) was a Roman Catholic diocese located in the town of Monteverde in the province of Avellino in Southern Italy. In 1718, it was suppressed to the Diocese of Sant'Angelo dei Lombardi e Bisaccia.

== Ordinaries ==
- Gerolamo de Caro (13 Mar 1521 – 3 Jul 1531 Appointed, Titular Bishop of Cannae)
