= Nicolaus Carpenia =

Archbishop of the Roman Catholic Church

Most Reverend Nicolaus Carpenia
- Archbishop of Durrës
- Church: Catholic Church
- Archdiocese: Archdiocese of Durrës
- In office: 1657–1670
- Predecessor: Marc Scurra
- Successor: Gerardus Galata

Orders
- Consecration: 16 September 1657 by Pietro Vito Ottoboni

Personal details
- Born: 1619 Durrës, Albania
- Died: 20 May 1670 (age 51) Durrës, Albania

Nicolaus Carpenia (1619–1670) was a Roman Catholic prelate who served as Archbishop of Durrës (1657–1670).

== Biography ==
Nicolaus Carpenia was born in Durrës in 1619. On 27 August 1657, he was appointed during the papacy of Pope Paul V as Archbishop of Durrës. On 16 September 1657, he was consecrated bishop by Pietro Vito Ottoboni, Bishop of Brescia, with Gregorio Giovanni Gasparo Barbarigo, Bishop of Bergamo, and Cristofor Segni, Titular Archbishop of Thessalonica, serving as co-consecrators. He served as Archbishop of Durrës until his death on 20 May 1670.

Catholic Church titles
Preceded by Marc Scurra	Archbishop of Durrës; 1657–1670	Succeeded by Gerardus Galata
