= Antonello de Folgore =

Roman Catholic prelate

Most Reverend Antonello de Folgore
- Bishop of Sant' Angelo de' Lombardi-Bisaccia
- Church: Catholic Church
- Diocese: Diocese of Sant' Angelo de' Lombardi-Bisaccia
- In office: 1585–1590
- Predecessor: Giovanni Battista Pietralata
- Successor: Flaminio Torricella

Orders
- Consecration: 13 December 1585 by Giulio Antonio Santorio

Personal details
- Died: 1590

Antonello de Folgore (died 1590) was a Roman Catholic prelate who served as Bishop of Sant' Angelo de' Lombardi-Bisaccia (1585–1590).

== Biography ==
On 27 November 1585, Antonello de Folgore was appointed during the papacy of Pope Sixtus V as Bishop of Sant' Angelo de' Lombardi-Bisaccia. On 13 December 1585, he was consecrated bishop by Giulio Antonio Santorio, Cardinal-Priest of San Bartolomeo all'Isola, with Giovanni Battista Pietralata, Bishop Emeritus of Sant' Angelo de' Lombardi-Bisaccia, and Andrea Canuto, Bishop of Oppido Mamertina, serving as co-consecrators. He served as Bishop of Sant' Angelo de' Lombardi-Bisaccia until his death in 1590.

== External links and additional sources ==
- Cheney, David M. "Diocese of Sant'Angelo dei Lombardi e Bisaccia". Catholic-Hierarchy.org. (for Chronology of Bishops) ^{[self-published]}
- Chow, Gabriel. "Archdiocese of Sant'Angelo dei Lombardi–Conza–Nusco–Bisaccia". GCatholic.org. (for Chronology of Bishops) ^{[self-published]}

Catholic Church titles
Preceded by Giovanni Battista Pietralata	Bishop of Sant' Angelo de' Lombardi-Bisaccia; 1585–1590	Succeeded by Flaminio Torricella
