= Lorenzo Pollicini =

Most Reverend Lorenzo Pollicini
- Bishop of Avellino e Frigento
- Church: Catholic Church
- Diocese: Diocese of Avellino e Frigento
- In office: 1653–1656
- Predecessor: Bartolomeo Giustiniani
- Successor: Tommaso Brancaccio

Orders
- Consecration: 16 November 1653 by Niccolò Albergati-Ludovisi

Personal details
- Born: 9 August 1603 Bologna, Italy
- Died: 7 July 1656 (age 52)

Lorenzo Pollicini (1603–1656) was a Roman Catholic prelate who served as Bishop of Avellino e Frigento (1653–1656).

== Biography ==
Lorenzo Pollicini was born in Bologna, Italy on 9 August 1603. On 10 November 1653, he was appointed during the papacy of Pope Innocent X as Bishop of Avellino e Frigento. On 16 November 1653, he was consecrated bishop by Niccolò Albergati-Ludovisi, Cardinal-Priest of Santa Maria degli Angeli e dei Martiri, with Giulio Rospigliosi, Titular Archbishop of Tarsus, and Cristofor Segni, Titular Archbishop of Thessalonica, serving as co-consecrators. He served as Bishop of Avellino e Frigento until his death on 7 July 1656.

== External links and additional sources ==
- Cheney, David M. "Diocese of Avellino". Catholic-Hierarchy.org. (for Chronology of Bishops) ^{[self-published]}
- Chow, Gabriel. "Diocese of Avellino (Italy)". GCatholic.org. (for Chronology of Bishops) ^{[self-published]}

Catholic Church titles
Preceded by Bartolomeo Giustiniani	Bishop of Avellino e Frigento; 1653–1656	Succeeded by Tommaso Brancaccio
