= Apostolic Nunciature to France =

Diplomatic post of the Holy See

Coordinates: 48°51′55″N 2°17′57″E

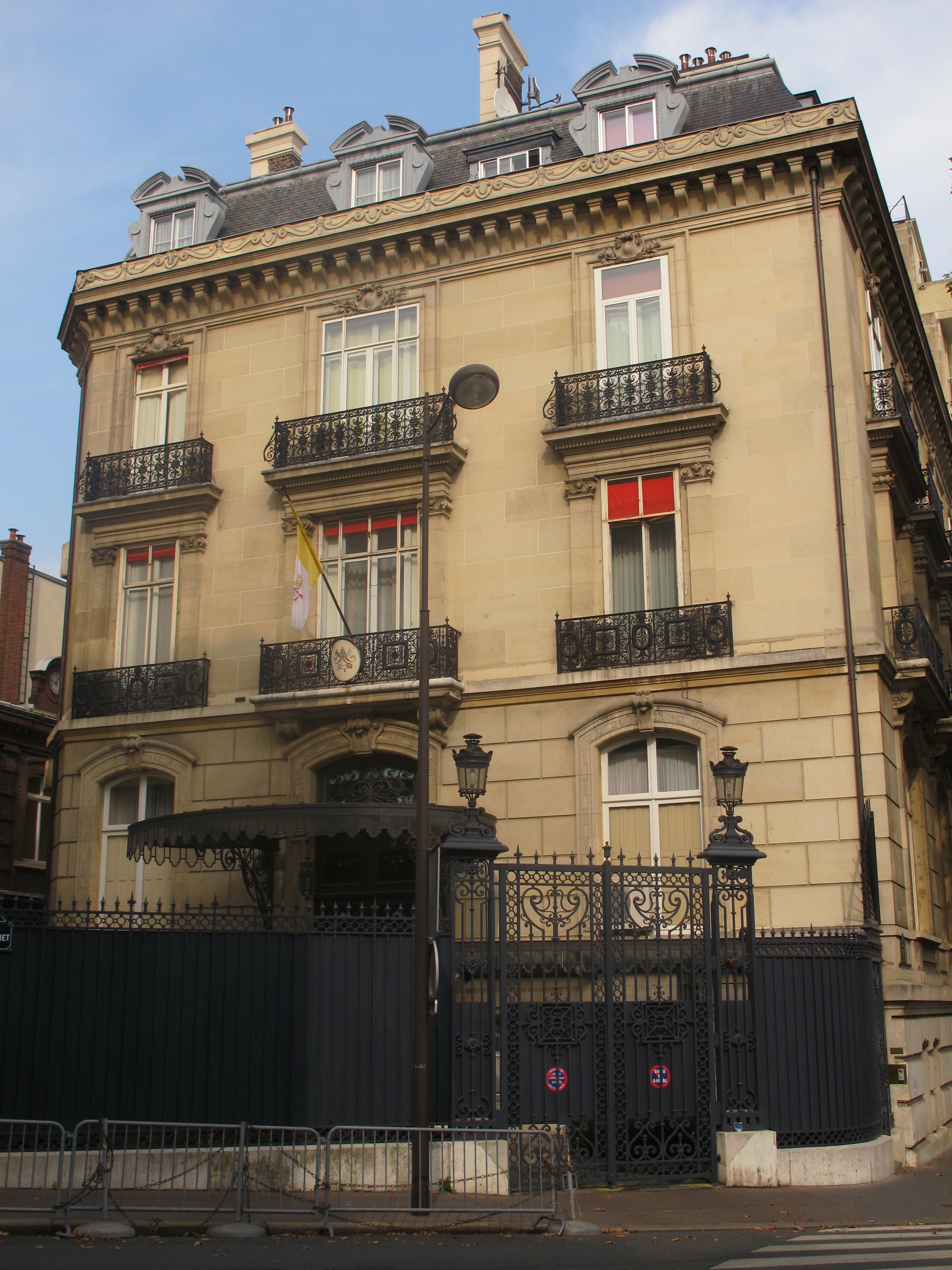
- Façade of the Apostolic Nunciature to the French Republic
- Location: Paris
- Apostolic Nuncio: Archbishop Celestino Migliore

The Apostolic Nunciature to France is an ecclesiastical office of the Catholic Church in France. It is a diplomatic post of the Holy See, whose representative is called the apostolic nuncio, with the rank of an ambassador.

== History of the Nunciature ==
The early twentieth century was a very difficult time in France-Vatican relations because of tensions over Church-State separation (laïcité) and anticlericalism, which were condemned by Pius X, and which led to the freezing of relations.

However, relations were renewed after the First World War and had very much improved, after the Second World War, under the presidency of Charles de Gaulle. There was controversy over relations under the Vichy regime, because the regime rewarded the Church even though some bishops sometimes opposed antisemitism. During this period, the Holy See's diplomatic mission moved to Vichy, first establishing itself in the Hôtel des Ambassadeurs.

Relations during the Sarkozy administration were relatively good, due to the government's announcement of an end to the ban on recognition of higher Christian institutions.

On 30 September 2019, it was revealed that then-nuncio Luigi Ventura, under investigation for sex abuse, was no longer living in France and resided in Rome, Italy. On 17 December 2019, Pope Francis accepted Ventura's resignation, which he had submitted upon turning 75 on 9 December. On 11 January 2020, Pope Francis appointed recent Russian nuncio Celestino Migliore nuncio to France.

== Apostolic Nuncios to France ==
=== 16th century ===
- Carlo Domenico del Carretto (1503 - )
- ...
- Rodolfo Pio (January 1535 – May 1537)
- Filiberto Ferrero (June 1537 - December 1540)
- Girolamo Dandini (December 1540 - May 1541)
- Girolamo Recanati Capodiferro (May 1541 - June 1543)
- Girolamo Dandini (June 1543 - May 1544)
- Alessandro Guidiccione (May 1544 - July 1546)
- Girolamo Dandini (July 1546 - August 1547)
- Michele Della Torre (October 1547 - 1550)
- Antonio Trivulzio the Younger (25 April 1550 - 1551)
- Rupture in diplomatic relations (1551 - 1552)
- Prospero Santacroce (15 July 1552 – 23 May 1554)
- Sebastiano Gualterio (1554 - 1556)
- Cesare Brancaccio (1556 - 20 July 1557)
- Lorenzo Lenzi (July 1557 - April 1560)
- Sebastiano Gualterio (29 March 1560 – 10 May 1561)
- Prospero Santacroce (1561 - 1565)
- Francesco Beltramini (October 1565 - 25 March 1566)
- Michele della Torre (25 March 1566 – 12 August 1568)
- Fabio Mirto Frangipani (12 August 1568 – 11 June 1572)
- Antonmaria Salviati (11 June 1572 – 8 March 1578)
- Anselmo Dandini (30 December 1577 - 1581)
- Giovanni Battista Castelli (1 April 1581 – 22 August 1583)
- Girolamo Ragazzoni (28 September 1583 – 14 June 1586)
- Fabio Mirto Frangipani (14 June 1586 – 17 March 1587)
- Gianfrancesco Morosini (1587 - 1589)
- Enrico Caetani (September 1589 – September 1590)
- Marsilio Landriani (May 1591 – February 1592)
- Filippo Sega (15 April 1592 – June 1594)
- Sede Vacante (June 1594 – May 1596)
- Francesco Gonzaga (10 May 1596 - 1599)
- Gaspare Silingardi (9 February 1599 – 25 May 1601)

=== 17th century ===
- Innocenzo Del Bufalo-Cancellieri (14 June 1601 – 26 September 1604)
- Maffeo Barberini (4 December 1604 – 20 September 1607)
- Roberto Ubaldini (20 September 1607 – 8 September 1616)
- Guido Bentivoglio d'Aragona (8 September 1616 – 11 January 1621)
- Ottavio Corsini (February 1621 – December 1623)
- Bernardino Spada (30 December 1623 – 27 February 1627)
- Giovanni Francesco Guidi di Bagno (27 February 1627 – 6 Sept 1630)
- Alessandro Bichi (6 September 1630 – 26 March 1634)
- Giorgio Bolognetti (26 March 1634 – 8 August 1639)
- Ranuccio Scotti Douglas (8 August 1639 – 9 March 1641)
- Girolamo Grimaldi-Cavalleroni (9 March 1641 – 25 June 1643)
- Nicolò Guidi di Bagno (25 June 1643 – 5 December 1656)
- Celio Piccolomini (15 November 1656 – 30 August 1663)
- Carlo Roberti de' Vittori (28 April 1664 - April 1667)
- Michele Antonio Vibò (April 1667 - March 1668)
- Niccolo Pietro Bargellini (11 February 1668 - July 1671)
- Michele Antonio Vibò (July 1671 - June 1672)
- Francesco Nerli the Younger (26 April 1672 - 1673)
- Fabrizio Spada (6 January 1674 – 27 August 1675)
- Pompeo Varese (27 January 1677 – 4 November 1678)
- Francesco Niccolini (21 February 1690 – 4 February 1692)
- Giovanni Giacomo Cavallerini (30 June 1692 – 15 April 1696)
- Daniello Marco Delfino (7 January 1696 - February 1700)

=== 18th century ===
- Filippo Antonio Gualterio (10 April 1700 – 31 August 1706)
  - Lorenzo Maria Fieschi (1702 - 1705) (extraordinary nuncio)
- Agostino Cusani (29 May 1706 - February 1712)
- Cornelio Bentivoglio (30 May 1712 – 16 October 1719)
- Bartolomeo Massei (24 August 1722 - Sept1730)
- Raniero d'Elci (27 January 1731 - May 1738)
- Marcello Crescenzi (8 August 1739 – 14 September 1743)
- Vincenzo Acqua (16 September 1743 – 24 March 1744)
- Carlo Francesco Durini (4 January 1744 - November 1753)
- Luigi Gualterio (1 May 1754 – 28 September 1759)
- Pietro Colonna Pamphili (4 February 1760 - September 1766)
- Bernardino Giraud (27 June 1767 - April 1773)
- Giuseppe Maria Doria Pamphilj (6 September 1773 - February 1785)
- Antonio Dugnani (18 June 1785 - 1790)
- Rupture in diplomatic relations (1790 - 1816)

=== 19th century ===
- Carlo Zen (27 August 1817 - 1819)
- Vincenzo Macchi (22 November 1819 – 2 October 1826)
- Luigi Emmanuele Nicolo Lambruschini (14 November 1826 – 30 September 1831)
- Pietro Antonio Garibaldi (July 1836 - 1842)
- Raffaele Fornari (12 December 1842 – 30 September 1850)
- Pietro Antonio Garibaldi (30 September 1850 – 16 June 1853)
- Carlo Sacconi (28 September 1853 – 27 September 1861)
- Flavio Chigi (30 September 1861 – 22 December 1873)
- Pier Francesco Meglia (27 April 1874 – 19 September 1879)
- Włodzimierz Czacki (19 September 1879 – 25 September 1882)
- Camillo Siciliano di Rende (25 October 1882 – 14 March 1887)
- Luigi Rotelli (12 May 1887 – 1 June 1891)
- Domenico Ferrata (10 May 1891 – 22 June 1896)
- Eugenio Clari (24 October 1896 – 9 March 1899)

=== 20th century ===
- Benedetto Lorenzelli (10 May 1899 – 31 July 1904 )
- Rupture in diplomatic relations, due to the French separation of Church and State (1904 - 1921)
- Bonaventura Cerretti (20 May 1921 – 12 October 1931)
- Luigi Maglione (23 June 1926 – 22 July 1938)
- Valerio Valeri (11 July 1936 – 1944)
- Angelo Giuseppe Roncalli (23 December 1944 – 15 January 1953)
- Paolo Marella (15 April 1953 – 1959)
- Paolo Bertoli (16 April 1960 – 1969)
- Egano Righi-Lambertini (23 April 1969 – 1979)
- Angelo Felici (27 August 1979 – 1 July 1988)
- Lorenzo Antonetti (23 September 1988 – 24 June 1995)
- Mario Tagliaferri (13 July 1995 – 21 May 1999)

=== 21st century ===
- Fortunato Baldelli (19 June 1999 – 2 June 2009)
- Luigi Ventura (22 September 2009 – 17 December 2019)
- Celestino Migliore (11 January 2020 – present)

== See also ==
- France-Holy See relations
