= Tommaso Brancaccio =

Most Reverend Tommaso Brancaccio
- Bishop of Nardò
- Church: Catholic Church
- Diocese: Diocese of Nardò
- In office: 1669–1677
- Predecessor: Girolamo Cori
- Successor: Orazio Fortunato
- Previous post: Bishop of Avellino e Frigento (1656–1669)

Personal details
- Born: 1621 Ugento, Italy
- Died: 29 April 1677 (age 56) Nardò, Italy

Tommaso Brancaccio (1621 – 29 April 1677) was a Roman Catholic prelate who served as Bishop of Nardò (1669–1677) and Bishop of Avellino e Frigento (1656–1669).

== Biography ==
Tommaso Brancaccio was born in Ugento, Italy in 1621. On 16 October 1656, he was appointed during the papacy of Pope Alexander VII as Bishop of Avellino e Frigento. On 19 August 1669, he was appointed during the papacy of Pope Clement IX as Bishop of Nardò. He served as Bishop of Avellino e Frigento until his death on 29 April 1677.

While bishop, he was the principal co-consecrator of Giuseppe Petagna, Bishop of Caiazzo (1657).

== See also ==
- Catholic Church in Italy

== External links and additional sources ==
- Cheney, David M. "Diocese of Avellino". Catholic-Hierarchy.org. (for Chronology of Bishops) ^{[self-published]}
- Chow, Gabriel. "Diocese of Avellino (Italy)". GCatholic.org. (for Chronology of Bishops) ^{[self-published]}
- Cheney, David M. "Diocese of Nardò-Gallipoli". Catholic-Hierarchy.org. (for Chronology of Bishops) ^{[self-published]}
- Chow, Gabriel. "Diocese of Nardò-Gallipoli (Italy)". GCatholic.org.(for Chronology of Bishops) ^{[self-published]}

Catholic Church titles
Preceded by Lorenzo Pollicini	Bishop of Avellino e Frigento; 1656–1669	Succeeded by Giovanni Battista Lanfranchi
Preceded by Girolamo Cori	Bishop of Nardò; 1669–1677	Succeeded by Orazio Fortunato
