= Michele Antonio Vibò =

Roman Catholic prelate

Most Reverend Michele Antonio Vibò
- Archbishop of Turin
- Church: Catholic Church
- Archdiocese: Archdiocese of Turin
- In office: 1690–1713
- Predecessor: Michele Beggiami
- Successor: Francesco Arborio di Gattinara
- Previous posts: Apostolic Internuncio to France (1667–1668 and 1671–1672)

Orders
- Ordination: 21 December 1654
- Consecration: 16 December 1690 by Gasparo Carpegna

Personal details
- Born: 27 September 1630 Turin, Italy
- Died: 13 February 1713 (age 82)

Michele Antonio Vibò (1630–1713) was a Roman Catholic prelate who served as Archbishop of Turin (1690–1713) and Apostolic Internuncio to France (1667–1668 and 1671–1672).

== Biography ==
Michele Antonio Vibò was born in Turin, Italy on 27 September 1630. He was ordained a deacon on 20 December 1654 and ordained a priest on 21 December 1654. In April 1667, he was appointed during the papacy of Pope Alexander VII as Apostolic Internuncio to France; he resigned in March 1668. In July 1671, he was again appointed during the papacy of Pope Clement X as Apostolic Internuncio to France; he resigned in June 1672. On 27 November 1690, he was appointed during the papacy of Pope Alexander VIII as Archbishop of Turin. On 16 December 1690, he was consecrated bishop by Gasparo Carpegna, Cardinal-Priest of Santa Maria in Trastevere. He served as Archbishop of Turin until his death on 13 February 1713.

While bishop, he was the principal co-consecrator of Michel-Gabriel Rossillon de Bernex, Bishop of Genève (1697).

== External links and additional sources ==
- Cheney, David M. "Nunciature to France". Catholic-Hierarchy.org. (for Chronology of Bishops) ^{[self-published]}
- Chow, Gabriel. "Apostolic Nunciature France". GCatholic.org. (for Chronology of Bishops) ^{[self-published]}
- Cheney, David M. "Archdiocese of Torino {Turin}". Catholic-Hierarchy.org. (for Chronology of Bishops) ^{[self-published]}
- Chow, Gabriel. "Metropolitan Archdiocese of Torino (Italy)". GCatholic.org. (for Chronology of Bishops) ^{[self-published]}

Catholic Church titles
Preceded by Carlo Roberti de' Vittori	Apostolic Internuncio to France (1st time); 1667–1668	Succeeded by Niccolo Pietro Bargellini
Preceded by Niccolo Pietro Bargellini	Apostolic Internuncio to France (2nd time); 1671–1672	Succeeded by Francesco Nerli (iuniore)
Preceded by Michele Beggiami	Archbishop of Turin; 1690–1713	Succeeded by Francesco Arborio di Gattinara
