= Bartolomé de la Cueva y Toledo =

Spanish Catholic cardinal (1499–1562)

His Eminence Bartolomé de la Cueva y Toledo
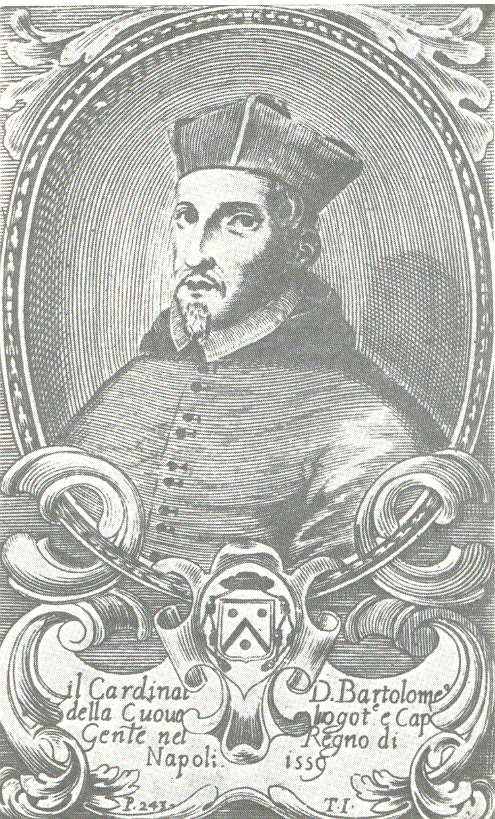
- Church: Catholic Church

Orders
- Consecration: 8 Jun 1549 by Juan Álvarez de Toledo
- Created cardinal: 19 December 1544 by Paul III

Personal details
- Born: 24 August 1499 Cuéllar, Castille
- Died: 29 June 1562 (aged 62) Rome, Papal States

Bartolomé de la Cueva y Toledo (24 August 1499 – 29 June 1562) was a Spanish Roman Catholic cardinal and bishop.

== Biography ==
Bartolomé de la Cueva y Toledo was born in Cuéllar on 24 August 1499, the son of Francisco Fernández de la Cueva, 2nd Duke of Alburquerque and his wife Francisca de Toledo.

As a young man, before he took Holy Orders, he had an illegitimate son, Bartolomé de la Cueva. Following his ordination, he was a cleric in the Diocese of Segovia, and a canon of the cathedral chapter of Toledo Cathedral. He also worked for the Apostolic See in Spain. In 1525, he and his brother Luis accompanied Charles V, Holy Roman Emperor during the emperor's visit to Italy.

Cardinal de la Cueva did not participate in the Council of Trent. He was a friend of Ignatius of Loyola, joining Loyola's Sociedad de la Gracia at Santa Marta al Collegio Romano in Rome in 1543. He was also the patron of the first Jesuit church build in Rome by Michelangelo in 1544.

Pope Paul III made him a cardinal priest in the consistory of 19 December 1544. He received the red hat and the titular church of San Matteo in Via Merulana on 5 May 1546. As a cardinal, he often resided at the papal court in Rome. Charles V was annoyed that Pedro Pacheco, Bishop of Pamplona was not elevated to the cardinalate and he forbade the three Spaniards made cardinals on 19 December 1544 from wearing the cardinalate habit until Bishop Pacheco was also made a cardinal the next year.

On 12 September 1548 he was named administrator of the see of Avellino e Frigento, holding this position until 10 March 1549.

On the vigil Pentecost, 8 June 1549, he was consecrated as a bishop in Rome by Cardinal Juan Álvarez de Toledo.

He participated in the papal conclave of 1549-50 that elected Pope Julius III. On 4 December 1551 he opted for the titular church of San Bartolomeo all'Isola. He served as Camerlengo of the Sacred College of Cardinals from 12 January 1554 to 7 January 1555. Cardinal de la Cueva participated in both the papal conclave of April 1555 that elected Pope Marcellus II and the papal conclave of May 1555 that elected Pope Paul IV. He opted for the titular church of Santa Croce in Gerusalemme on 29 May 1555.

From October 1558 to June 1559, he served as viceroy of the Kingdom of Naples.

He was a participant in the papal conclave of 1559 that elected Pope Pius IV. The new pope appointed him to a commission of cardinals tasked with studying church reform in 1560. On 13 September 1560 he was promoted to the metropolitan see of Manfredonia.

He died in the former Medici palace in Rome on 29 June 1562. He was initially buried in Nostra Signora del Sacro Cuore. His remains were later transferred to the family tomb in the monastery of San Francisco in Cuéllar.

Catholic Church titles
Preceded by Charles de Hémard de Denonville	Cardinal-Priest of San Matteo in Merulana; 1546–1551	Succeeded by Girolamo Dandini
Preceded by Geronimo Albertini	Administrator of Avellino e Frigento; 1548–1549	Succeeded by Ascanio Albertini
Preceded by Jacques d'Annebaut	Cardinal-Priest of San Bartolomeo all'Isola; 1551–1555	Succeeded by Fulvio Giulio della Corgna
Preceded by Marcello Cervini	Cardinal-Priest of Santa Croce in Gerusalemme; 1555–1562	Succeeded by Gianantonio Capizucchi
Preceded by Dionisio de Robertis	Administrator of Manfredonia; 1560–1562	Succeeded by Tolomeo Gallio
