= Bartolomeo Giustiniani =

Most Reverend Bartolomeo Giustiniani
- Bishop of Avellino e Frigento
- Church: Catholic Church
- Diocese: Diocese of Avellino
- In office: 1626–1653
- Predecessor: Muzio Cinquini
- Successor: Lorenzo Pollicini

Orders
- Consecration: 22 February 1626 by Antonio Marcello Barberini

Personal details
- Born: 15 November 1585 Chios, Greece
- Died: 24 April 1653 (age 67) Avellino, Italy

Bartolomeo Giustiniani (1585–1653) was a Roman Catholic prelate who served as Bishop of Avellino e Frigento (1626–1653).

== Biography ==
Bartolomeo Giustiniani was born in Chios, Greece on 15 November 1585. On 9 February 1626, he was appointed during the papacy of Pope Urban VIII as Bishop of Avellino e Frigento. On 22 February 1626, he was consecrated bishop by Antonio Marcello Barberini, Cardinal-Priest of Sant'Onofrio. He served as Bishop of Avellino e Frigento until his death on 24 April 1653.

== External links and additional sources ==
- Cheney, David M. "Diocese of Avellino". Catholic-Hierarchy.org. (for Chronology of Bishops) ^{[self-published]}
- Chow, Gabriel. "Diocese of Avellino (Italy)". GCatholic.org. (for Chronology of Bishops) ^{[self-published]}

Catholic Church titles
Preceded by Muzio Cinquini	Bishop of Avellino e Frigento; 1626–1653	Succeeded by Lorenzo Pollicini
