= Battista de Ventura =

Roman Catholic prelate

Most Reverend Battista de Ventura
- Bishop of Avellino e Frigento
- Church: Catholic Church
- Diocese: Diocese of Avellino e Frigento
- In office: 1465–1492
- Successor: Antonio Pirro
- Previous post: Bishop of Frigento (1455–1465)

Personal details
- Died: 1492

Battista de Ventura (died 1492) was a Roman Catholic prelate who served as Bishop of Avellino e Frigento (1465–1492) and Bishop of Frigento (1455–1465).

== Biography ==
On 12 September 1455, he was appointed during the papacy of Pope Paul II as Bishop of Frigento. On 20 May 1465, he was appointed during the papacy of Pope Paul II as Bishop of Avellino e Frigento. He served as Bishop of Avellino e Frigento until his death in 1492. While bishop, he was the principal co-consecrator of Pietro Guglielmo de Rocha, Archbishop of Salerno (1471).

== External links and additional sources ==
- Cheney, David M. "Diocese of Avellino". Catholic-Hierarchy.org. (for Chronology of Bishops) ^{[self-published]}
- Chow, Gabriel. "Diocese of Avellino (Italy)". GCatholic.org. (for Chronology of Bishops) ^{[self-published]}
- Cheney, David M. "Diocese of Frigento". Catholic-Hierarchy.org. (for Chronology of Bishops) ^{[self-published]}
- Chow, Gabriel. "Titular Episcopal See of Frigento". GCatholic.org. (for Chronology of Bishops) ^{[self-published]}

Catholic Church titles
Preceded by	Bishop of Frigento; 1455–1465	Succeeded by diocese united to Avellino
Preceded by	Bishop of Avellino e Frigento; 1465–1492	Succeeded by Antonio Pirro
