= Silvio Messaglia =

Most Reverend Silvio Messaglia
- Bishop of Avellino e Frigento
- Church: Catholic Church
- Diocese: Diocese of Avellino e Frigento
- In office: 1520–1544
- Predecessor: Arcangelo Madrignano
- Successor: Geronimo Albertini

Personal details
- Died: 1544

Silvio Messaglia (died 1544) was a Roman Catholic prelate who served as Bishop of Avellino e Frigento (1520–1544).

== Biography ==
Silvio Messaglia was ordained a priest in the Cistercian Order. On 28 March 1520, he was appointed during the papacy of Pope Leo X as Bishop of Avellino e Frigento. He served as Bishop of Avellino e Frigento until his death in 1544.

== External links and additional sources ==
- Cheney, David M. "Diocese of Avellino". Catholic-Hierarchy.org. (for Chronology of Bishops) ^{[self-published]}
- Chow, Gabriel. "Diocese of Avellino (Italy)". GCatholic.org. (for Chronology of Bishops) ^{[self-published]}

Catholic Church titles
Preceded by Arcangelo Madrignano	Bishop of Avellino e Frigento; 1520–1544	Succeeded by Geronimo Albertini
