= Valerio Cancellieri =

Roman Catholic prelate

Most Reverend Valerio Cancellieri
- Bishop of Sant'Angelo dei Lombardi e Bisaccia
- Church: Catholic Church
- Diocese: Diocese of Sant'Angelo dei Lombardi e Bisaccia
- In office: 1542–1574
- Predecessor: Nicola Volpe
- Successor: Pietrantonio Vicedomini

Personal details
- Died: 1574

Valerio Cancellieri (died 1574) was a Roman Catholic prelate who served as Bishop of Sant'Angelo dei Lombardi e Bisaccia (1542–1574).

== Biography ==
On 11 October 1542, Valerio Cancellieri was appointed during the papacy of Pope Paul III as Bishop of Sant'Angelo dei Lombardi e Bisaccia. He served as Bishop of Sant'Angelo dei Lombardi e Bisaccia until his death in 1574.

== External links and additional sources ==
- Cheney, David M. "Diocese of Sant'Angelo dei Lombardi e Bisaccia". Catholic-Hierarchy.org. (for Chronology of Bishops) ^{[self-published]}
- Chow, Gabriel. "Archdiocese of Sant'Angelo dei Lombardi–Conza–Nusco–Bisaccia". GCatholic.org. (for Chronology of Bishops) ^{[self-published]}

Catholic Church titles
Preceded by Nicola Volpe	Bishop of Sant'Angelo dei Lombardi e Bisaccia; 1542–1574	Succeeded by Pietrantonio Vicedomini
