= Domenico Sorrentino (bishop) =

Most Reverend Domenico Sorrentino
- Bishop of Vulturara e Montecorvino
- Church: Catholic Church
- Diocese: Diocese of Vulturara e Montecorvino
- In office: 1676–1708
- Predecessor: Marco Antonio Pisanelli
- Successor: Imperialis Pedicini
- Previous post: Bishop of Ruvo (1673–1676)

Orders
- Ordination: 21 Dec 1670
- Consecration: 16 Apr 1673

Personal details
- Born: 25 Sep 1640 Cava
- Died: Sep 1708 (age 67)

Domenico Sorrentino (1640–1708) was a Roman Catholic prelate who served as Bishop of Vulturara e Montecorvino (1676–1708) and Bishop of Ruvo (1673–1676).

== Biography ==
Domenico Sorrentino was born in Cava on 25 Sep 1640 and ordained a priest on 21 Dec 1670. He was appointed Bishop of Ruvo on 13 Mar 1673, by Pope Clement X. On 16 Apr 1673, he was consecrated bishop by Francesco Maria Febei, Titular Archbishop of Tarsus, with Pier Antonio Capobianco, Bishop Emeritus of Lacedonia, and Giuseppe di Giacomo, Bishop of Bovino, serving as co-consecrators. On 27 Apr 1676, he was appointed Bishop of Vulturara e Montecorvino by Pope Clement X. He served as Bishop of Vulturara e Montecorvino until his death in Sep 1708.

== External links and additional sources ==
Catholic Church titles
Preceded by Sebastiano d'Alessandro	Bishop of Ruvo; 1673–1676	Succeeded by Domenico Gallesi
Preceded by Marco Antonio Pisanelli	Bishop of Vulturara e Montecorvino; 1676–1708	Succeeded by Imperialis Pedicini
