= Rainaldo Cancellieri =

Roman Catholic prelate

Most Reverend Rainaldo Cancellieri
- Bishop of Sant'Angelo dei Lombardi e Bisaccia
- Church: Catholic Church
- Diocese: Diocese of Sant'Angelo dei Lombardi
- In office: 1502–1517
- Predecessor: Biagio de Locha
- Successor: Nicola Volpe

Rainaldo Cancellieri was a Roman Catholic prelate who served as Bishop of Sant'Angelo dei Lombardi (1502–1517).

== Biography ==
On 16 December 1502, Rainaldo Cancellieri was appointed during the papacy of Pope Alexander VI as Bishop of Sant'Angelo dei Lombardi. He served as Bishop of Sant'Angelo dei Lombardi e Bisaccia until his resignation on 23 December 1517.

== External links and additional sources ==
- Cheney, David M. "Diocese of Sant'Angelo dei Lombardi e Bisaccia". Catholic-Hierarchy.org. (for Chronology of Bishops) ^{[self-published]}
- Chow, Gabriel. "Archdiocese of Sant'Angelo dei Lombardi–Conza–Nusco–Bisaccia". GCatholic.org. (for Chronology of Bishops) ^{[self-published]}

Catholic Church titles
Preceded by Biagio de Locha	Bishop of Sant'Angelo dei Lombardi; 1502–1517	Succeeded by Nicola Volpe
