= Michele Della Torre =

Italian Roman Catholic bishop and cardinal

Michele Della Torre (1511–1586) was an Italian Roman Catholic bishop and cardinal.

A member of the Della Torre family, Michele Della Torre was born in Udine in 1511, the son of nobleman Luigi della Torre and his wife Taddea Strasoldo. He became Count of Valdessina in 1533.

Early in his career, he was a cleric in Aquileia. He later became the dean of Udine Cathedral. In 1543, he became chamberlain of Pope Paul III.

On 7 February 1547 he was elected Bishop of Ceneda and was subsequently consecrated as a bishop. He served as the Apostolic Nuncio to France from 20 August 1547 to 1550. He participated in the Council of Trent from 11 October 1551 until 28 April 1552 and from 10 October 1561 until its closing. He was vice-legate in Perugia and Umbria from 15 September 1553 until June 1555. From 23 May 1555 until 1557 he was the majordomo of the papal household. Under Pope Pius IV, he was a Referendary of the Apostolic Signatura. He was again nuncio in the Kingdom of France from 25 March 1566 until 12 August 1568.

Pope Gregory XIII made him a cardinal priest in the consistory of 12 December 1583. He never received the red hat or a titular church, nor did he participate in the papal conclave of 1585 that elected Pope Sixtus V.

He died in Ceneda on 21 February 1586 and was buried in the cathedral there.
