= Giovanni Battista Lanfranchi =

Most Reverend Giovanni Battista Lanfranchi
- Bishop of Avellino e Frigento
- Church: Catholic Church
- Diocese: Diocese of Avellino e Frigento
- In office: 1670–1673
- Predecessor: Tommaso Brancaccio
- Successor: Carlo Pellegrini (bishop)

Personal details
- Born: 1606 Naples, Italy
- Died: 3 January 1673 (age 67) Avellino, Italy

Giovanni Battista Lanfranchi (1606 – 3 January 1673) was a Roman Catholic prelate who served as Bishop of Avellino e Frigento (1670–1673).

== Biography ==
Giovanni Battista Lanfranchi was born in Naples, Italy in 1606 and ordained a priest in the Congregation of Clerics Regular of the Divine Providence. On 30 June 1670, he was appointed during the papacy of Pope Clement X as Bishop of Avellino e Frigento. He served as Bishop of Avellino e Frigento until his death on 3 January 1673.

== External links and additional sources ==
- Cheney, David M. "Diocese of Avellino". Catholic-Hierarchy.org. (for Chronology of Bishops) ^{[self-published]}
- Chow, Gabriel. "Diocese of Avellino (Italy)". GCatholic.org. (for Chronology of Bishops) ^{[self-published]}

Catholic Church titles
Preceded by Tommaso Brancaccio	Bishop of Avellino e Frigento; 1670–1673	Succeeded by Carlo Pellegrini (bishop)
