= Ascanio Albertini =

Most Reverend Ascanio Albertini
- Bishop of Avellino e Frigento
- Church: Catholic Church
- Diocese: Diocese of Avellino e Frigento
- In office: 1549–1580
- Predecessor: Bartolomé de la Cueva y Toledo
- Successor: Pietrantonio Vicedomini

Personal details
- Born: 1526 Nola, Italy
- Died: 1580 (age 54)

Ascanio Albertini (1526–1580) was a Roman Catholic prelate who served as Bishop of Avellino e Frigento (1549–1580).

== Biography ==
Ascanio Albertini was born in Nola, Italy in 1526. On 10 May 1549, he was appointed during the papacy of Pope Paul III as Bishop of Avellino e Frigento. He served as Bishop of Avellino e Frigento until his death in 1580.

== Episcopal succession ==
While bishop, he was the principal co-consecrator:

- Francesco Beltramini, Bishop of Terracina, Priverno e Sezze (1565);
- Giovanni D'Amato, Bishop of Minori (1565);
- Miler Magrath, Bishop of Down and Connor (1565);
- Nicolas Ugrinovich, Bishop of Smederevo (1565); and
- Beatus di Porta, Bishop of Chur (1565).

== External links and additional sources ==
- Cheney, David M. "Diocese of Avellino". Catholic-Hierarchy.org. (for Chronology of Bishops) ^{[self-published]}
- Chow, Gabriel. "Diocese of Avellino (Italy)". GCatholic.org. (for Chronology of Bishops) ^{[self-published]}

Catholic Church titles
| Preceded by Bartolomé de la Cueva y Toledo | Bishop of Avellino e Frigento; 1549–1580 | Succeeded by Pietrantonio Vicedomini |
