= Francesco Scannagatta =

Roman Catholic prelate and bishop

Most Reverend Francesco Scannagatta
- Bishop of Avellino e Frigento
- Diocese: Diocese of Avellino e Frigento
- In office: 1679–1700
- Predecessor: Carlo Pellegrini
- Successor: Emanuele Cicatelli

Orders
- Ordination: 6 April 1658
- Consecration: 18 June 1679 by Alessandro Crescenzi

Personal details
- Born: 1632 Dongo, Italy
- Died: 18 March 1700 (age 68)

Francesco Scannagatta (more properly, Scanegata) (1632 – 18 March 1700) was a Roman Catholic prelate who served as Bishop of Avellino e Frigento (1679–1700).

== Biography ==
Francesco Scannagatta was born in Dongo, Italy, a small village on the northwest shore of Lake Como, in 1632.

He studied for and obtained the degree of Doctor in utroque iure (Doctor of Civil and Canon Law) at the University of Milan. He was ordained a priest on 6 April 1658.

He served as Vicar General of the diocese of Loreto. As Vicar General he was sent as papal internuncio to Turin. He then served as Vicar General of Cardinal Innoco Caracciolo, who became Archbishop of Naples in 1667.

On 12 June 1679, he was appointed during the papacy of Pope Innocent XI as Bishop of Avellino e Frigento. On 18 June 1679, he was consecrated bishop by Cardinal Alessandro Crescenzi, Bishop of Recanati e Loreto, with Pier Antonio Capobianco, Bishop Emeritus of Lacedonia, and Domenico Gianuzzi, Titular Bishop of Dioclea in Phrygia, serving as co-consecrators. During his term as bishop, Scanegata held frequent diocesan synods, in each of his first eight years, from 1680 to 1687, and then in 1689, 1690, 1692 and 1694. He served as Bishop of Avellino e Frigento until his death on 18 March 1700.

== External links and additional sources ==
- Cheney, David M. "Diocese of Avellino". Catholic-Hierarchy.org. (for Chronology of Bishops) ^{[self-published]}
- Chow, Gabriel. "Diocese of Avellino (Italy)". GCatholic.org. (for Chronology of Bishops) ^{[self-published]}

Catholic Church titles
Preceded by Carlo Pellegrini	Bishop of Avellino e Frigento; 1679–1700	Succeeded by Emanuele Cicatelli
