= Gabriele Setario =

Most Reverend Gabriele Setario
- Bishop of Avellino e Frigento
- Church: Catholic Church
- Diocese: Diocese of Avellino e Frigento
- In office: 1507–1510
- Predecessor: Antonio de Caro
- Successor: Giovanni Francesco Setario
- Previous post: Bishop of Nardò (1491–1507)

Gabriele Setario was a Roman Catholic prelate who served as Bishop of Avellino e Frigento (1507–1510) and Bishop of Nardò (1491–1507).

== Biography ==
In 1491, Gabriele Setario was appointed during the papacy of Pope Innocent VIII as Bishop of Nardò. On 27 October 1507, he was appointed during the papacy of Pope Julius II as Bishop of Avellino e Frigento. He served as Bishop of Avellino e Frigento until his resignation in 1510.

== External links and additional sources ==
- Cheney, David M. "Diocese of Nardò-Gallipoli". Catholic-Hierarchy.org. (for Chronology of Bishops) ^{[self-published]}
- Chow, Gabriel. "Diocese of Nardò-Gallipoli (Italy)". GCatholic.org.(for Chronology of Bishops) ^{[self-published]}

Catholic Church titles
Preceded by	Bishop of Nardò; 1491–1507	Succeeded by Antonio de Caro
Preceded by Antonio de Caro	Bishop of Avellino e Frigento; 1507–1510	Succeeded by Giovanni Francesco Setario
