= Lucas Bueno =

Spanish Roman Catholic prelate

His Excellency Lucas Bueno O.S.Io.Hieros.
- Bishop of Malta
- Appointed: 15 December 1666
- In office: 1666-1668
- Predecessor: Miguel Juan Balaguer Camarasa
- Successor: Lorenzo D'Astiria

Orders
- Consecration: 1664
- Rank: Bishop

Personal details
- Born: Campillo de Aragón, Spain
- Died: 7 September 1668

Lucas Bueno (died 7 September 1668) was a Spanish Roman Catholic prelate who served as Bishop of Malta from 1666 to 1668.

== Biography ==
Bueno was appointed as Titular Archbishop of Thessalonica on 15 September 1664. After the see of Malta had been vacant for 3 years, the former inquisitor of Malta, Fabio Chigi and now Pope Alexander VII, nominated Bueno as Bishop of Malta on 15 December 1666. Subsequently, he was also nominated as Titular Archbishop Rossano. Inquisitor Ranuzzi wrote of Bueno that he was renowned for his gentility with people. He died after only a little over two years as Bishop of Malta.
