= Chapel of St Nicholas, Żonqor =

Chapel of St. Nicholas
- Il-Kappella ta' San Nikola
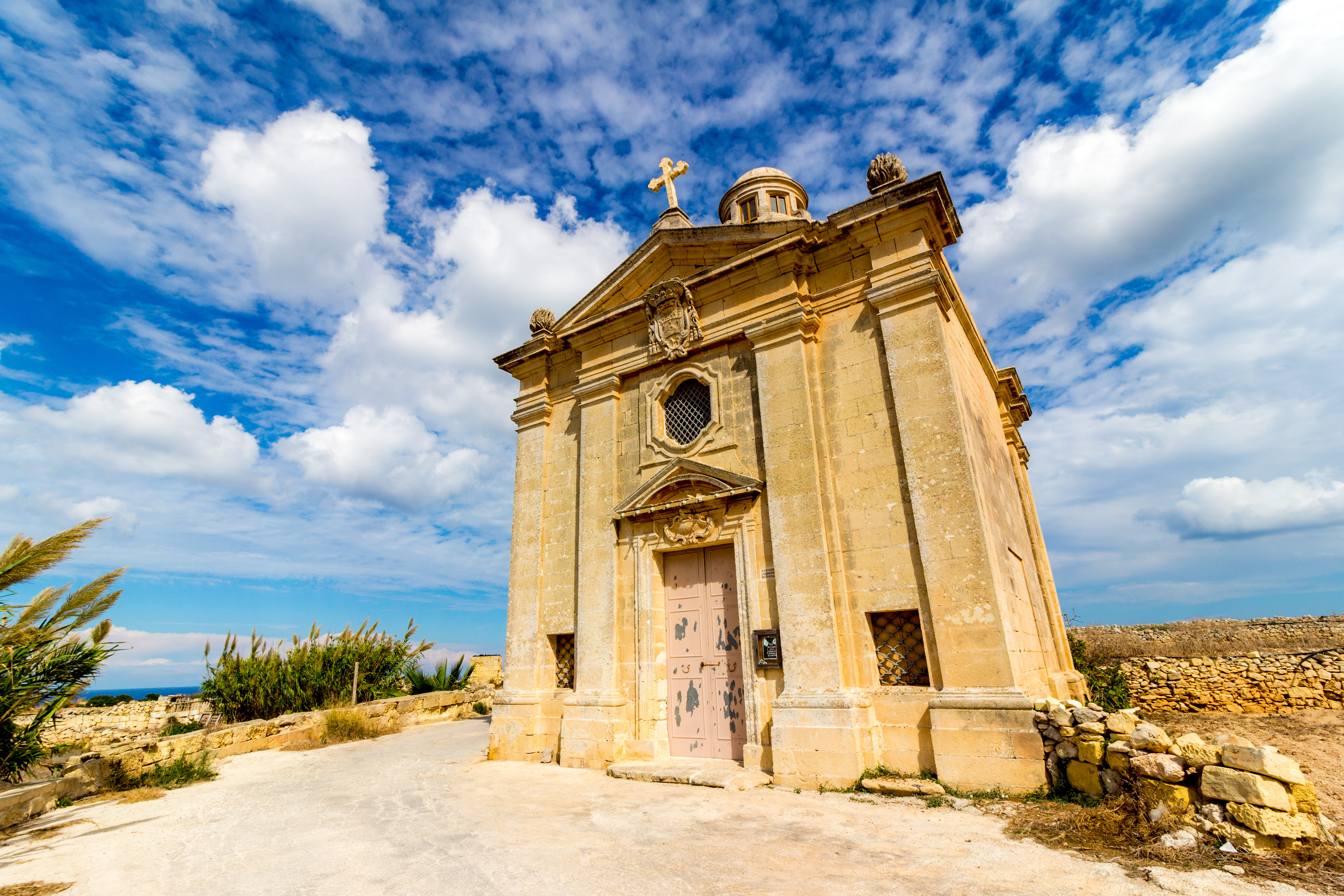
- View of the Chapel of St. Nicholas
- Chapel of St. Nicholas
- 35°52′25.2″N 14°33′42.8″E
- Location: Marsaskala
- Country: Malta
- Denomination: Roman Catholic

History
- Status: Chapel
- Founded: c. 16th century (original chapel)
- Dedication: Saint Nicholas

Architecture
- Functional status: Active
- Style: Baroque
- Years built: 1759–1762

Specifications
- Materials: Limestone

Administration
- Archdiocese: Malta
- Parish: Żabbar

The Chapel of Saint Nicholas (Maltese: Il-Kappella ta' San Nikola or ta' San Niklaw), sometimes known as Tas-Subriċint, is a Roman Catholic chapel located in the Żonqor area between Marsaskala and Żabbar, Malta. A previous chapel dedicated to Saint Nicholas was located in the area from at least the early 16th century, but it was deconsecrated in the 17th century. The present building was constructed between 1759 and 1762 in the Baroque style. Today, the chapel is located within the limits of Marsaskala, but it is administered by the parish of Żabbar.

== History ==
Notarial documents of the early 16th century suggest that a chapel dedicated to Saint Nicholas existed in the Żonqor area. This chapel formed part of the parish of St. Catherine of Żejtun, and it stood on land which belonged to Salvu Burlò. It was visited by Pietro Dusina in 1575, who found that the chapel had an altar but no door, and that it was undecorated. Burlò was ordered to install a wooden door.

This chapel was not well-maintained, and it was not used regularly, which resulted in it being profaned by Bishop Miguel Juan Balaguer Camarasa on 25 March 1659, and again by Lorenzo D'Astiria in 1666. It remained functional for a few more years, before being profaned for a third time by Bishop Miguel Jerónimo de Molina on 25 March 1679.

The present building was built by the lawyer Giovanni Battista Azzopardi Barbara, in order to fulfill the wish of his father, Gian Francesco. The first stone was laid down on 10 July 1759 by monsignor Giovanni Maria Azzopardi Castelletti. It was completed within three years, being was consecrated in 1762. The chapel was presumably built to serve the religious needs of farmers who lived in the area, and it is sometimes known as Tas-Subriċint. At some point, a plaque stating non gode l'immunita ecclesias was installed near the doorway to indicate that the chapel did not enjoy ecclesiastical immunity.

The chapel was damaged during World War II, and it was repaired in November 1945. For some time, Society of Christian Doctrine members from Żabbar used the chapel for retreats.

Today, the chapel is located within the limits of Marsaskala, but it forms part of the parish of Żabbar. The chapel is open on Friday evenings for rosary or adoration, and mass is held there once every month.

The chapel is listed on the National Inventory of the Cultural Property of the Maltese Islands. It is erroneously listed twice with inventory numbers 1741 and 2102, under the localities of Marsaskala and Żabbar respectively.

== Architecture ==
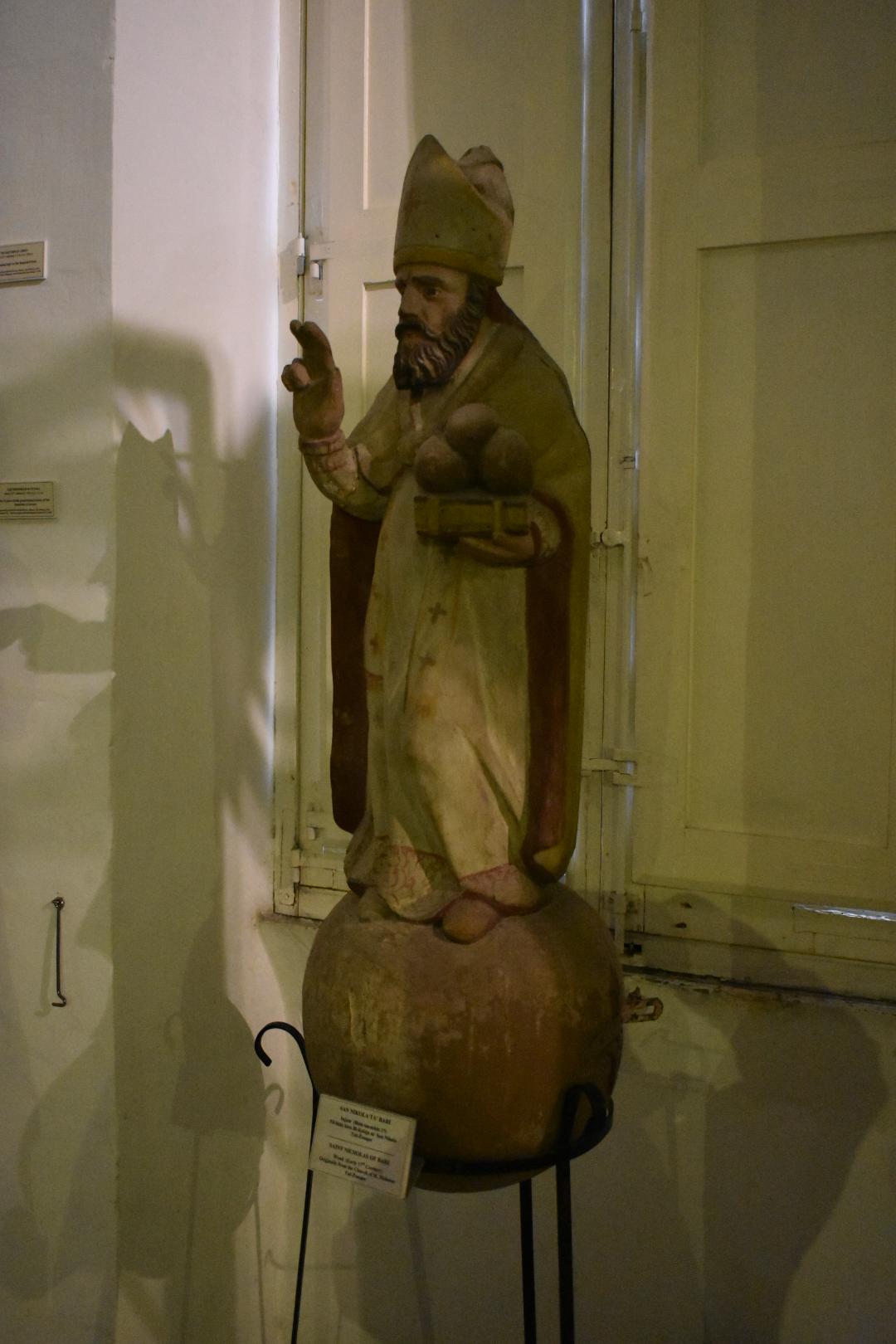
Wooden statue of St. Nicholas, now in the Żabbar Sanctuary Museum

The chapel is built in the Baroque style out of local limestone. The chapel is a rectangular building, and it has a small cylindrical dome with a lantern. The façade contains the main portal, which is flanked by two sets of flat pilasters set on plinths. The doorway is set in the central bay, and it is decorated by mouldings and topped with a pediment. A window which illuminates the chapel is found above the door. A wide entablature topped by a cornice runs along the entire façade, and another triangular pediment tops the central bay.

This is decorated with the coat of arms of Bishop Bartolomé Rull, surmounted by the arms of Grand Master Manuel Pinto da Fonseca. A plaque with a Latin inscription commemorating the chapel's completion is found above the main doorway, while a longer inscription describing the course of construction is located inside the chapel.

== Artworks ==
The chapel's altarpiece depicts Saint Nicholas wearing a bishop's clothing, and it is attributed to Mattia Preti's bottega. The original painting is now in the Żabbar Sanctuary Museum, and a copy by Michael Mifsud is located inside the chapel.

A small wooden statue of Saint Nicholas from the old chapel was moved to the Żabbar parish church in the 17th century, but was placed back in the new chapel once this was completed. This was eventually moved to the Żabbar Sanctuary Museum, and another statue of the saint is found in the chapel.
