= Giovanni Francesco Setario =

Most Reverend Giovanni Francesco Setario
- Bishop of Avellino e Frigento
- Church: Catholic Church
- Diocese: Diocese of Avellino e Frigento
- In office: 1510–1516
- Predecessor: Gabriele Setario
- Successor: Arcangelo Madrignano

Personal details
- Died: 1516 Avellino, Italy

Giovanni Francesco Setario (died 1516) was a Roman Catholic prelate who served as Bishop of Avellino e Frigento (1510–1516).

== Biography ==
On 11 January 1510, Giovanni Francesco Setario was appointed during the papacy of Pope Leo X as Bishop of Avellino e Frigento. He served as Bishop of Avellino e Frigento until his death in 1516.

== External links and additional sources ==
- Cheney, David M. "Diocese of Avellino". Catholic-Hierarchy.org. (for Chronology of Bishops) ^{[self-published]}
- Chow, Gabriel. "Diocese of Avellino (Italy)". GCatholic.org. (for Chronology of Bishops) ^{[self-published]}

Catholic Church titles
Preceded by Gabriele Setario	Bishop of Avellino e Frigento; 1510–1516	Succeeded by Arcangelo Madrignano
