= Lorenzo D'Astiria =

Spanish Roman Catholic bishop

His Excellency Lorenzo D'Astiria O.S.Io.Hieros.
- Bishop of Malta
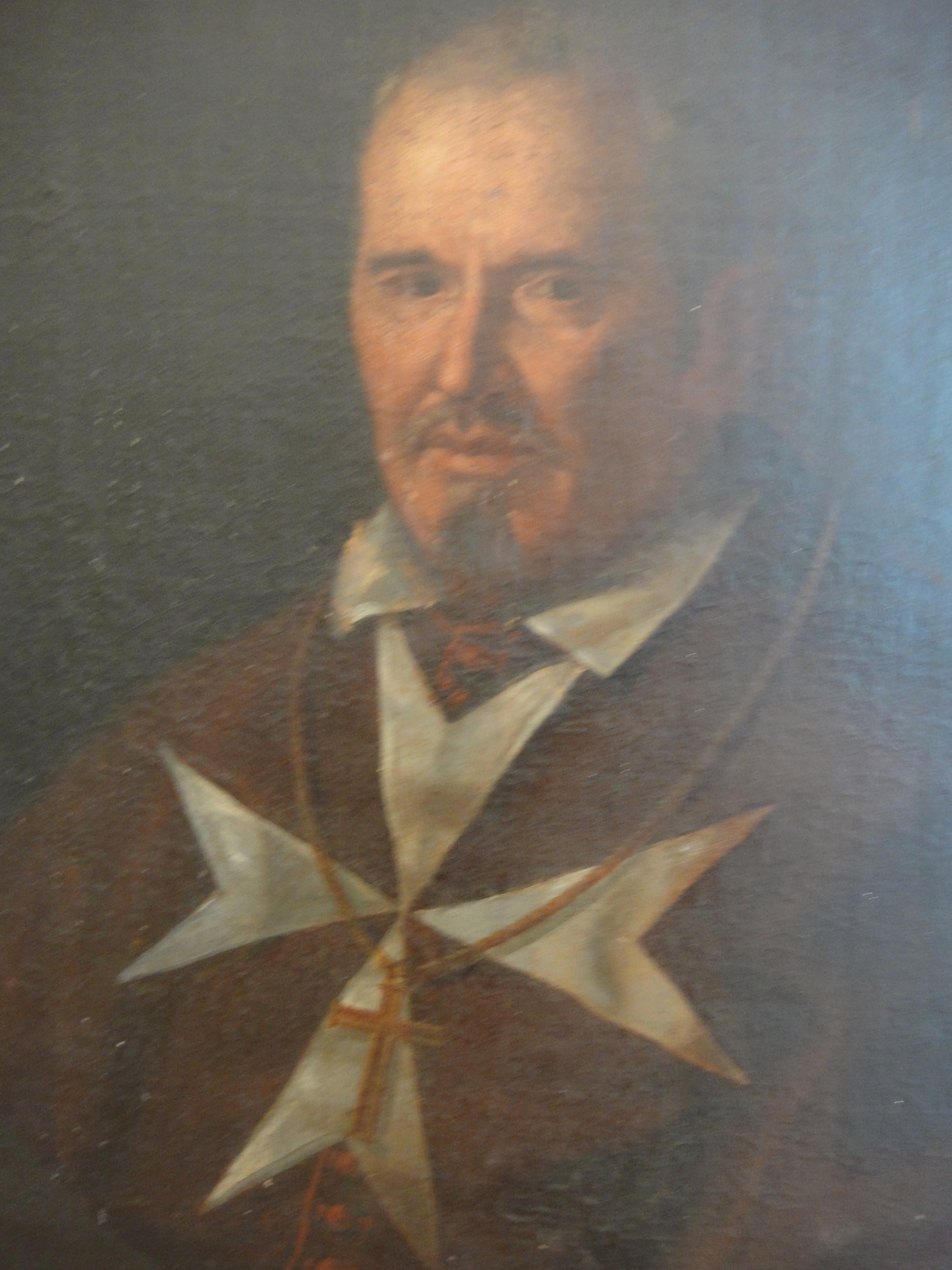
- Church: Roman Catholic
- Diocese: Malta
- Appointed: 16 June 1670
- In office: 1670-1678
- Predecessor: Lucas Buenos
- Successor: Miguel Jerónimo de Molina

Orders
- Ordination: 22 April 1628
- Consecration: 6 July 1670 by Carlo Carafa della Spina
- Rank: Bishop

Personal details
- Born: 1604 Tarazona, Spain
- Died: 5 January 1678 (aged 73–74)

Lorenzo D'Astiria (1604 - 5 January 1678) was a Spanish Roman Catholic bishop of Malta in the 17th century.

== Early life ==
D'Astiria was born in Tarazona in the province of Zaragoza, Spain in 1604. He was ordained priest of the Sovereign Military Order of Malta on April 22, 1628.

== Bishop of Malta ==
On June 16, 1670 Pope Clement X appointed D'Astiria to succeed Lucas Buenos as Bishop of Malta and ordain bishop on 6 July 1670 by Cardinal Carlo Carafa della Spina.

During his episcopacy he visited and consecrated numerous churches among these are mentioned the visit to the church of Our Lady of Mercy in Xewkija, Gozo. It is reported that on this visit Bishop D'Astiria gave permission for the reopening of the church which had been closed. This took place because a certain Petronilla Pontremoli promised to celebrate the feast of Our Lady and to distribute bread to all the poor. It is recorded that on 30 September 1671 Bishop Lorenzo D'Astiria made a pastoral visit to Mqabba. Bishop D'Astiria also blessed the chapel of St Angelo in Żejtun and the chapel of Saint Anne located in an area called Pwales near St. Paul's Bay. The latter church was blessed on July 1, 1672. On September 26, 1673, he also visited the chapel of the Annunciation in Balzan where he ordered the transfer of the buried corpses buried in this chapel to the parish church. Also it is recorded that during this visit he also ordered that the main altar be transferred to the parish church as well. Bishop D'Astiria is also responsible for the reopening of the chapel of the Assumption, nowadays known as Ta' Pinu in Għarb, Gozo. During his episcopacy about 11,300 people died as a consequence of a plague epidemic between 1675 and 1676. Lorenzo D'Astiria died on January 5, 1678, at the age of 74.
