= Zenopolis (Lycia) =

Ancient Roman and Byzantine city

Zenopolis (Greek: Ζηνούπολις) was an ancient Roman and Byzantine city and episcopal see variously placed in Lycia or in neighbouring Pamphylia.

At the Second Council of Constantinople (553), one bishop signed as "Gennadius by the mercy of God bishop of the Zenopolitans, a city of the province of Pamphylia". The acts of the Second Council of Nicaea (787), on the other hand, bear the signature of Σταυράκιος ἐπίσκοπος Ζηνοπόλεως (Stauracius bishop of Zenopolis), who sat with the bishops of Lycia. In about 940, the Notitia Episcopatuum of Constantine Porphyrogenitus listed a Zenopolis in Pamphylia.

In his Origines Ecclesiasticae, Joseph Bingham gave Zenopolis as the name of two distinct cities, one in Lycia, the other in Pamphylia, and indicates that the Pamphylian see was also called Diciozanabrus. Le Quien interpreted the references instead as concerning a single city that could be viewed as part of either of the two contiguous provinces of Lycia and Pamphylia. Vailhé does not distinguish between any of the cities that bore the name, but writes as if all were identical with the one in Isauria.

The Catholic Church's list of titular sees includes the see as Zenopolis in Lycia.
