= Diocese of Avellino =

Roman Catholic diocese in Italy

Diocese of Avellino Dioecesis Abellinensis

Catholic

Location
- Country: Italy
- Episcopal conference: Episcopal Conference of Italy
- Ecclesiastical region: Campania
- Ecclesiastical province: Benevento

Statistics
- Area: 394 km^{2} (152 sq mi)
- Population: Total; Catholics: (as of 2020); 162,000 (est.); 156,000 (est.)
- Parishes: 66

Information
- Denomination: Catholic Church
- Rite: Roman Rite
- Established: 2nd Century
- Cathedral: Cattedrale di S. Maria Assunta
- Secular priests: 68 (diocesan); 14 (Religious Orders); 17 Permanent Deacons

Current leadership
- Pope: Leo XIV
- Bishop: Arturo Aiello

Map
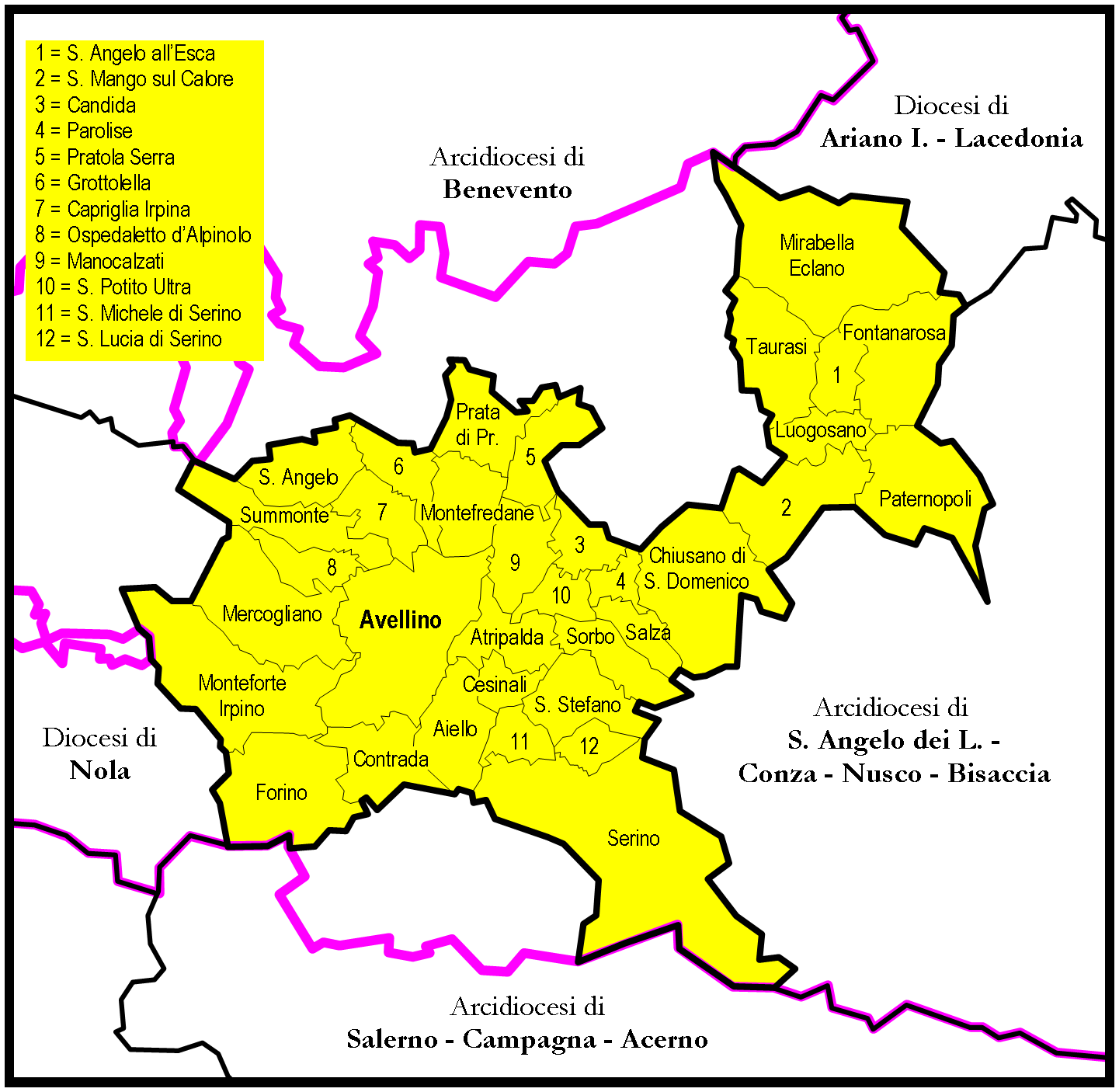

Website
- www.diocesi.avellino.it

The Diocese of Avellino (Latin: Dioecesis Abellinensis) is a Latin diocese of the Catholic Church in the territory of the Irpini, some 55 km (30 mi) east of Naples and 23 km (14 mi) south of Benevento, in the modern Republic of Italy. It is suffragan to the archdiocese of Benevento. The bishop of Avellino, along with the bishop of S. Agata de' Goti, had the privilege, recognized at the provincial synod of 1654, of being summoned to attend upon the death and obsequies of the archbishop of Benevento.

Bishop Lorenzo Pollicini (1653–1656) attended the provincial synod in Benevento in 1654, and also held a diocesan synod in May 1654.

== History of the diocese ==
Avellino was traditionally said to have been founded by St. Sabinus, a disciple of Saint Peter the Apostle, at the beginning of the 2nd century. The list of bishops, however, begins in the 12th century.

On 5 December 1456, Campania and the former duchy of Benevento were hit with a major earthquake, with over 40,000 dead. It may have been the largest on record for all of southern Italy. It was followed by another on 30 December. Benevento was for the most part destroyed, suffering between 350 and 500 dead. Brindisi, with nearly all of its inhabitants, was destroyed. Apice, in the diocese of Benevento, was completely destroyed, as was Casalduni. 2.000 died at Ariano in the territory of Avellino, and the town was in ruins; Lacedonia was reduced to dust and abandoned completely. Sant' Agata dei Goti was assai conquassata ('practically crushed;). The extensive damage and death may account, at least in part, for the diocesan reorganization of the metropolitanate of Benevento.

The Diocese of Frigento, whose list of bishops extends from 1080 to 1455, was united with that of Avellino from 9 May 1466, until 27 June 1818, when it was suppressed. During that time, however, on two occasions, the dioceses were again separated, in both cases to benefit an uncle-nephew pair, one of whom became bishop of Avellino and the other bishop of Frigento, on the understanding that, on the death of either one, the survivor would reunite the two dioceses.

In the summer of 1561 the area of Avellino was struck by a series of natural disasters. Trouble began with a major earthquake, centered on the Vallo di Diano in the Basilicata, on 24 July. On the last day of July Avellino was the victim of an extraordinary windstorm with clouds of dust so thick that the sky was obscured, which was followed by a rain of pebbles and lightning flashes, the result of an aftershock of the quake of the 24th. Damages to buildings was severe, and the people abandoned their houses and lived in the open, outside the city. On 2 August at midday a third earthquake hit, less violent than the two preceding ones. The worst of all, whose epicenter was apparently near Avellino, occurred on the afternoon of 19 August. It was felt at Naples, and at Palo near Sale 20 people died; at Sicicgnano 40 died, at Vietro another 20, 40 at Pola, and at Caggiano 30. At Avellino nearly all the houses suffered from serious cracks, especially at the Torri del Castro and the Episcopal Palace.

In May 1698, when Bishop Scannagatta attended the provincial synod of Benevento, he signed his name Franciscus Episcopus Abellinensis, Frequintinensis, Aquae-putridae seu Mirabellae, et Quintodecimi, giving clear evidence of the incorporation of two other ancient dioceses besides Frigento into the diocese of Avellino.

Avellino and Frigento were both vacant from 1782 to 1792, due to disputes between the Papacy and the Kingdom of Naples; and each diocese had its own Vicar General. The territory was captured by French forces in 1799, and Napoleon had his Minister of Foreign Affairs, Charles Maurice de Talleyrand-Périgord, named Prince of Benevento. From 1809 to 1815, Pope Pius VII was prisoner of Napoleon in France, and was unable and unwilling to cooperate with Napoleon's brother-in-law, Joachim Murat who had been named King of Naples (1808–1815). In 1815 the Congress of Vienna restored King Ferdinand I of Naples and Sicily (Kingdom of the Two Sicilies), and Pius VII ceded him the papal rights to Benevento (which included Avellino). A concordat (treaty) was signed on 16 February 1818, and in a separate document, dated 7 March 1818, Pius VII granted Ferdinand the right to nominate all bishops in the Kingdom of the Two Sicilies.

In 1861, after the revolution in the Kingdom of the Two Sicilies in favor of Italian unity under the House of Savoy, Bishop Francesco Gallo of Avellino, who was staying in Naples in the house of the Fathers of the Mission, was arrested and deported to Turin, where he was kept in prison for more than two years. His exile from Avellino lasted until 1866.

=== Cathedral and Chapter ===
In the Kingdom of the Two Sicilies, all of the cathedrals, including those of Avellino and of Frigento, were dedicated to the Bodily Assumption of the Virgin Mary into Heaven.

The Cathedral of Avellino was begun in the episcopate of Bishop Robert (early 12th century), and carried out during the reigns of King William I of Sicily and William II of Sicily. It was dedicated by Bishop Guillelmus in 1166. It replaced the church which had been built by King Roger II of Sicily and Rainulf Count of Avellino.

In 1673 the Chapter of the Cathedral of the Assumption was composed of four dignities and twelve Canons. In the Cathedral of Frigento there were three dignities and seven Canons. By 1745 the number of Canons at Avellino had increased to twenty. In 1900 the Chapter was composed of four dignities (the Archdeacon, the Archpriest, the Primicerius Major, and the Primicerius Minor) and twenty-three Canons (one of whom served as Penitentiary and another as Theologian).

== Bishops ==
=== Diocese of Avellino ===
Latin Name: Avellinensis seu Abellinensis
Metropolitan: Archdiocese of Benevento

[Sabinus]

- Timotheus (c. 496–c. 499)

...

- Joannes (1124–1132)
- Robertus (1132–1145)
- Vigiliantius (c. 1145)
- Guillelmus (1166–1189)
- Rogerius (1189–c. 1218 ?)
- Jacobus (c. 1265)
- Joannes (c. 1266)
- Leonardus (c. 1267–c. 1287/1288)
- Benedictus (1288–1294/1295)
- Franciscus (1295–1310)
- Nicolaus (1311– )
- Gotifridus de Tufo ( ? –1325 ?)
- Natimbene, O.E.S.A. (1326–1334)
- Nicolaus, O.P. (1334–1351)
- Raimundus (1351–1363)
- Nicolaus de Serpito, O.Min. (1363–1391)
- Matthaeus (1391–1423)
- Cicco Francesco Palombo, O.S.B. (1423–1431)
- Fuccio (1432–1465)
- Baptista (1465–1492)

=== Diocese of Avellino e Frigento ===
- Battista de Ventura (20 May 1465 – 1492 Died)
- Antonius Pirro (1492–1503)
- Cardinal Bernardino de Carvajal, Administrator (1503 – 1505?)
- Antonio de Caro (1505?–1507)
- Gabriele Setario (1507–1510)
- Giovanni Francesco Setario (1510–1516)
- Arcangelo Madrignano (1516–1520)
- Silvio Messaglia, O. Cist. (1520–1544)
- Geronimo Albertini (1545–1548) Bishop-elect
- Cardinal Bartolomé de la Cueva (1548–1549) Administrator
- Ascanio Albertini (10 May 1549 – 1580 Died)
- Pietrantonio Vicedomini (4 Nov 1580 – 1591 Resigned)
- Fulvio Passerini (1591–1599)
- Tommaso Vannini (1599–1609)
- Muzio Cinquini (1609–1625)
- Bartolomeo Giustiniani (1626–1653)
- Lorenzo Pollicini (10 Nov 1653 – 7 Jul 1656 Died)
- Tommaso Brancaccio (1656–1669)
- Giovanni Battista Lanfranchi, C.R. (1670–1673)
- Carlo Pellegrini (1673–1678)
- Francesco Scanegata 1679–1700)
- Emanuele Cicatelli (1700–1703)
- Pietro Alessandro Procaccini (1704–1722)
- Francesco Antonio Finy (6 Jul 1722–1726)
- [Cherubino Tommaso Nobilione, O.P.] (1726)
- Giovanni Paolo Torti Rogadei, O.S.B. (9 Dec 1726 – 19 Aug 1742 Died)
- Antonio Maria Carafa della Spina, C.R. (24 Sep 1742 – 4 May 1745 Died)
- Felice Leone, O.S.A. (19 Jul 1745 – 9 Jul 1754 Died)
- Benedetto Latilla, C.R.L. (16 Dec 1754 – 29 Feb 1760 Resigned)
- Gioacchino Martínez (21 Apr 1760 – 21 Feb 1782 Died)

Sede Vacante (1782–1792)

- Sebastiano de Rosa (1792–1810)

Sede Vacante (1810–1818)

=== Diocese of Avellino ===
Name Changed: 27 June 1818

- Domenico Novi Ciavarria (6 Apr 1818 – 4 May 1841 Died)
- Giuseppe Palma, O. Carm. (3 Apr 1843 – 12 Oct 1843 Died)
- Giuseppe Maria Maniscalco, O.F.M. (1844–1854)
- Francesco Gallo (1855–1896)
- Serafino Angelini (30 Nov 1896 – 4 Feb 1908 Died)
- Giuseppe Padula (2 Aug 1908 – 18 Nov 1928 Died)
- Francesco Petronelli (18 Jan 1929 –1939)
- Guido Luigi Bentivoglio, S.O.C. (27 Jul 1939 – 1949)
- Gioacchino Pedicini (22 Nov 1949 – 2 Jun 1967 Retired)
- Pasquale Venezia (2 Jun 1967 – 28 Feb 1987 Retired)
- Gerardo Pierro (28 Feb 1987 – 1992)
- Antonio Forte, O.F.M. (20 Feb 1993 – 13 Nov 2004 Retired)
- Francesco Marino (13 November 2004 – 11 November 2016)
- Arturo Aiello (6 May 2017 – present)

== Books ==
=== Reference works ===
- Gams, Pius Bonifatius (1873). Series episcoporum Ecclesiae catholicae: quotquot innotuerunt a beato Petro apostolo. Ratisbon: Typis et Sumptibus Georgii Josephi Manz. pp. 671–674. (in Latin)
- Eubel, Conradus, ed. (1913). Hierarchia catholica. Vol. Tomus 1 (second ed.). Münster: Libreria Regensbergiana. (in Latin)
- Eubel, Conradus, ed. (1914). Hierarchia catholica. Vol. Tomus 2 (second ed.). Münster: Libreria Regensbergiana. (in Latin)
- Gulik, Guilelmus (1923). Eubel, Conradus (ed.). Hierarchia catholica. Vol. Tomus 3 (second ed.). Münster: Libreria Regensbergiana. (in Latin)
- Gauchat, Patritius (Patrice) (1935). Hierarchia catholica. Vol. Tomus IV (1592-1667). Münster: Libraria Regensbergiana. (in Latin)
- Ritzler, Remigius; Sefrin, Pirminus (1952). Hierarchia catholica medii et recentis aevi V (1667-1730). Patavii: Messagero di S. Antonio.
- Ritzler, Remigius; Sefrin, Pirminus (1958). Hierarchia catholica medii et recentis aevi. Vol. Tomus VI (1730-1799). Patavii: Messagero di S. Antonio. (in Latin)
- Ritzler, Remigius; Sefrin, Pirminus (1968). Hierarchia Catholica medii et recentioris aevi sive summorum pontificum, S. R. E. cardinalium, ecclesiarum antistitum series... A pontificatu Pii PP. VII (1800) usque ad pontificatum Gregorii PP. XVI (1846) (in Latin). Vol. VII. Monasterii: Libr. Regensburgiana.
- Remigius Ritzler; Pirminus Sefrin (1978). Hierarchia catholica Medii et recentioris aevi... A Pontificatu PII PP. IX (1846) usque ad Pontificatum Leonis PP. XIII (1903) (in Latin). Vol. VIII. Il Messaggero di S. Antonio.
- Pięta, Zenon (2002). Hierarchia catholica medii et recentioris aevi... A pontificatu Pii PP. X (1903) usque ad pontificatum Benedictii PP. XV (1922) (in Latin). Vol. IX. Padua: Messagero di San Antonio. ISBN 978-88-250-1000-8.

=== Studies ===
- Bella-Bona, Scipione (1656). Raguagli della città d'Avellino (in Italian) (reprint by Forni editore ed.). Trani: Lorenzo Valerii.
- Cappelletti, Giuseppe (1864). Le chiese d'Italia: dalla loro origine sino ai nostri giorni (in Italian). Vol. Decimonono (19). Venezia: G. Antonelli. pp. 157–190.
- Kehr, Paul Fridolin (1962). Regesta pontificum Romanorum. Italia pontificia, Vol.IX: Samnium—Apulia—Lucania. ed. Walter Holtzmann. Berlin: Weidemann. (in Latin)
- Lanzoni, Francesco (1927). Le diocesi d'Italia dalle origini al principio del secolo VII (an. 604). Faenza: F. Lega (in Italian)
- Ughelli, Ferdinando; Coleti, Nicolaus (1721). Italia sacra, sive de episcopis Italiae, et insularum adjacentium (in Latin). Vol. Tomus octavus (8). Venezia: Apud Sebastianum Coleti. pp. 188–206, 284–296.
- Zigarelli, Giuseppe (1848). "Avellino". In: D'Avino, Vincenzio, ed. (1848). Cenni storici sulle chiese arcivescovili, vescovili, e prelatizie (nullius) del Regno delle Due Sicilie (in Italian). Ranucci. pp. 37–45.
- Zigarelli, Giuseppe (1856). Storia della Cattedra di Avellino e de'suoi pastori, con brevi notizie de'Metropolitani della chiesa di Benevento seguito dalla serie cronologica de'vescovi di Frigento e da una esatta descrizione de'luoghi onde di presente viene composta la prima opera (in Italian). Vol. I. Napoli: Vaglio. Zigarelli, Gius (1856). Volume II.
- Annuario Eccl. (Rome, 1907)
