= Diocese of Capaccio =

Historic diocese in Campania

Coordinates: 40.2333°N 15.2667°E

Diocese of Vallo della Lucania Dioecesis Vallensis in Lucania

Location
- Country: Italy
- Ecclesiastical province: Salerno-Campagna-Acerno

Statistics
- Area: 1,562 km^{2} (603 sq mi)
- Population: Total; Catholics: (as of 2020); 158,600 (est.); 156,600 (guess)
- Parishes: 139

Information
- Denomination: Catholic Church
- Rite: Roman Rite
- Established: 12th Century
- Cathedral: Cattedrale di S. Pantaleone
- Secular priests: 75 (diocesan); 16 (religious Orders); 9 Permanent Deacons

Current leadership
- Pope: Leo XIV
- Bishop: Ciro Miniero
- Bishops emeritus: Giuseppe Rocco Favale

Website
- www.diocesivallodellalucania.it

The Italian Catholic Diocese of Capaccio was an historic diocese in Campania. The title came to be used in the second half of the 12th century, when the bishops of Pesto (Paestum) were driven from their seat by the Norman invasion led by Duke Robert Guiscard, and the town of Pesto was sacked and burned. Bishop Leonardus (1159) appears to have been the first to use the title episcopus Caputaquensis. In 1851 it became the Diocese of Capaccio and Vallo. Since 1945 it has been the Roman Catholic Diocese of Vallo della Lucania.

== History ==
Bishops of Pesto (Paestum) are known by the end of the sixth century. All of the dioceses of Lucania, except Paestum, appear to have been fatally damaged by the appearance of the Arian Lombards at the end of the 6th century. Paestum was attacked in the early 10th century by the Saracens, who fortified the area of Agropoli, which had once been the citadel of the Greek colony and then the Roman colony of Paestum. The city was burned. The inhabitants fled into the mountains, where they built the town that came to be called Capaccio. In 1080, the town of Pesto was devastated by the Norman Duke Robert Guiscard, and nearly deserted.

Ecclesiastically, Pesto becomes associated with Capaccio by 967, when Pope John XIII wrote to "reverendissimo confratri nostro, Petro Paestano Episcopo, quae Caput-aquis dicitur.

The episcopal palace was in Capaccio, but the bishops also had residences in Sala, Novi, and Diano. The episcopal palace at Diano, purchased and improved by Bishop Francesco Brancaccio, was dedicated in 1629. In 1704, the bishop resided in S(c)ala, and pontificated in the church of S. Pietro.

In 1583, a diocesan synod was held, presided over by the Vicar General Silvio Galasso, in the absence of Bishop Lorenzo Belo, who was ill. Bishop Pedro de Mata (1611–1627) held a diocesan synod in 1617. Bishop Francesco Maria Brancaccio (1627–1635) held a diocesan synod in 1629. On 12–14 December 1649, Bishop Tommaso Carafa (1639–1664) presided at a diocesan synod held in Laurino.

The diocese of Capaccio had a seminary, located in Diano; and three episcopal colleges (high schools), in Novi Velia, Sicignano degli Alburni, and Capaccio.

=== After Napoleon ===
Following the extinction of the Napoleonic Kingdom of Italy, the Congress of Vienna authorized the restoration of the Papal States and the Kingdom of Naples. Since the French occupation had seen the abolition of many Church institutions in the Kingdom, as well as the confiscation of most Church property and resources, it was imperative that Pope Pius VII and King Ferdinand IV reach agreement on restoration and restitution.

==== 1818 ====
A concordat was finally signed on 16 February 1818, and ratified by Pius VII on 25 February 1818. Ferdinand issued the concordat as a law on 21 March 1818. The re-erection of the dioceses of the kingdom and the ecclesiastical provinces took more than three years. The right of the king to nominate the candidate for a vacant bishopric was recognized, as in the Concordat of 1741, subject to papal confirmation (preconisation). On 27 June 1818, Pius VII issued the bull De Ulteriore, in which he reestablished the metropolitan archbishopric of Salerno, with five suffragan dioceses, including Capaccio.

==== 1853 ====
The diocese, as it had grown over the centuries, had become extremely large in geographical extent, and, as the population grew as well, it became much more difficult to administer. In 1848, the inhabitants numbered some 182,000. Discussions on dividing the diocese had already begun in the reign of Pope Gregory XVI, division of assets and relocation of facilities being of prime consideration. Progress was interrupted by the revolutions of 1848, and the deposition of the pope and creation of the Roman Republic. In addition, Bishop Gregorio Fistilli had resigned on 26 September 1848, leaving the diocese of Capaccio without a bishop from 1848 to 1853. By April 1850, however, Pius IX was back in Rome, and by 1853 general agreement had been reached with Ferdinand II of the Two Sicilies and with representatives of the communities in the diocese of Capaccio. The diocese would be divided into two separate dioceses, one at Diano and the other at Vallo.

On 16 July 1853, Pius IX signed the bull "Cum propter justitiae dilectionem," establishing the diocese of "Caputaquensis et Vallensis" (Capaccio e Vallo). The new diocese was to be a suffragan of the archdiocese of Salerno. The parish church of S. Pantaleone was elevated to the status of cathedral, and a Chapter was created consisting of two dignities (the Archdeacon and the Archpriest) and twelve canons, a Canon Theologus and a Canon Penitentiary, and six mansionarii.

== Bishops ==
Latin Name: Caputaquensis

=== 1159 to 1500 ===
- Leonardus (1159)
- Arnalfus (attested 1176, 1179)
- Michael (attested 1188)
- N[ - - - ] (attested 1196)

Nicholas (1202– ? ) Administrator

- Gilibertus (1209–after 1218)

...

- Benvenuto Campore (1252- ? )
- Petrus (1275-1286)
- Gotbertus (1286–1294)
- Giovanni della Porta (1294–1312)
- Philippus de Santo Magno (1312–1338)

Sede vacante (July 1338–June 1341)

- Tommaso da Santo Magno (1341–1382)
- Nicola Morini (1382–1385?) Avignon Obedience
- Giacomo, O.E.S.A. (1382–1399) Roman Obedience
- Giovanni Loar (1385– ? ) Avignon Obedience
- Riccardo ( ? –1391) Avignon Obedience
- Giovanni Bonifacio Panella (1399 –1407) Roman Obedience
- Guilelmus (1407–1410)
- Baldassare del Giudice (1412–1418)
- Giovanni Caracciolo (1418) Bishop-elect
- Tommaso de Berengeriis (1418–1422)
- Bernardo Caraccioli (1422–1425)
- Francesco Tomacelli (1425–1439)
- Bartholomaeus (1439–1441)
- Masello Mirto (1441–1462)
- Francesco dei Conti di Segni (1463–1471)
- Francesco Bertini (1471–1476)
- Ausias Despuig (9 Aug 1476 – 2 Sep 1483 Died)
- Ludovico Podocathor (1483–1503)

=== 1500 to 1859 ===
Luigi d'Aragona (1503–1514 Resigned) Administrator
Vincenzo Galeotta (1514–1522) Administrator
Lorenzo Pucci (1522–1523 Resigned) Administrator

- Tommaso Caracciolo (1523–1531 Resigned)
- Enrico Loffredo (18 Dec 1531 – Jan 1547 Died)

Francesco Sfondrati (23 Mar 1547–1549) Administrator

- Girolamo Verallo (9 Nov 1549 – 1 Mar 1553 Resigned)
- Paolo Emilio Verallo (1553–1587 Resigned)
- Lorenzo Belo (1574 – 1586)
- Lelio Morelli (16 Jun 1586 – 1609 Died)
- Giovanni Vitelli, C.R. (14 Dec 1609 – 1610 Died)
- Pedro de Mata y Haro, C.R. (28 Feb 1611 – 3 Mar 1627 Died)
- Francesco Maria Brancaccio (9 Aug 1627 – 12 Feb 1635 Resigned)
- Luigi Pappacoda (12 Feb 1635 – 30 May 1639 Appointed, Bishop of Lecce)
- Tommaso Carafa (11 Jul 1639 – 7 Dec 1664 Died)
- Camillo Ragona (13 Apr 1665 – 1 Aug 1677 Died)
- Andrea Bonito, C.O. (14 Jun 1677 – 2 Feb 1684 Died)
- Giovanni Battista De Pace, C.O. (5 Jun 1684 – 20 Nov 1698 Died)
- Vincenzo Corcione (11 Apr 1699 – 8 Nov 1703 Died)
- Francesco Paolo Nicolai (21 Jul 1704 – 2 Sep 1716 Appointed, Archbishop of Conza)
- Carlo Francesco Giocoli (15 Mar 1717 – 14 Dec 1723 Died)
- Agostino Odoardi, O.S.B. (14 Feb 1724 – 25 Jun 1741 Died)
- Pietro Antonio Raimondi (22 Jan 1742 – 15 Apr 1768 Died)
- Angelo Maria Zuccari (16 May 1768 – 26 Dec 1794 Died)
- Vincenzo Torrusio (18 Dec 1797 –1804)
- Filippo Speranza (1804–1834)
- Michele Barone (6 Apr 1835 Confirmed – 7 Oct 1842 Died)
- Giuseppe Maria d'Alessandro (19 Jun 1843 Confirmed – 24 Nov 1845 Confirmed, Bishop of Sessa Aurunca)
- Gregorio Fistilli (24 Nov 1845 Confirmed – 26 Sep 1848 Resigned)
- Francesco Giampaolo (23 Mar 1855 Confirmed –1859)

== See also ==
- Diocese of Pesto
- Roman Catholic Diocese of Vallo della Lucania
- Roman Catholic Diocese of Teggiano-Policastro (Diano)
- Catholic Church in Italy
- List of Catholic dioceses in Italy

== Bibliography ==
=== Reference works for bishops ===
- Gams, Pius Bonifatius (1873). Series episcoporum Ecclesiae catholicae: quotquot innotuerunt a beato Petro apostolo (in Latin). Ratisbon: Typis et Sumptibus Georgii Josephi Manz. p. 866. (Use with caution; obsolete)
- Eubel, Conradus, ed. (1913). Hierarchia catholica (in Latin). Vol. 1 (second ed.). Münster: Libreria Regensbergiana.
- Eubel, Conradus, ed. (1914). Hierarchia catholica (in Latin). Vol. 2 (second ed.). Münster: Libreria Regensbergiana.
- Eubel, Conradus; Gulik, Guilelmus (1923). Hierarchia catholica (in Latin). Vol. 3 (second ed.). Münster: Libreria Regensbergiana.
- Gauchat, Patritius (Patrice) (1935). Hierarchia catholica (in Latin). Vol. 4 (1592-1667). Münster: Libraria Regensbergiana.
- Ritzler, Remigius; Sefrin, Pirminus (1952). Hierarchia catholica medii et recentis aevi (in Latin). Vol. 5 (1667-1730). Patavii: Messagero di S. Antonio.
- Ritzler, Remigius; Sefrin, Pirminus (1958). Hierarchia catholica medii et recentis aevi (in Latin). Vol. VI (1730-1799). Patavii: Messagero di S. Antonio.
- Ritzler, Remigius; Sefrin, Pirminus (1968). Hierarchia Catholica medii et recentioris aevi ... A pontificatu Pii PP. VII (1800) usque ad pontificatum Gregorii PP. XVI (1846) (in Latin). Vol. VII. Monasterii: Libr. Regensburgiana.

=== Studies ===
- Cappelletti, Giuseppe (1866). Le chiese d'Italia della loro origine sino ai nostri giorni (in Italian). Vol. vigesimo (20). Venezia: Giuseppe Antonelli. pp. 331–337.
- D'Avino, Vincenzio (1848). Cenni storici sulle chiese arcivescovili, vescovili, e prelatizie (nullius) del regno delle due Sicilie (in Italian). Naples: dalle stampe di Ranucci. pp. 132–134. [article by Angelo Marchisano]
- Ebner, Pietro (1982). Chiesa, baroni e popolo nel Cilento. (in Italian). Vol. I (Roma: Edizioni di storia e letteratura).
- Kehr, Paul Fridolin (1935). Italia pontificia. Vol. VIII: Regnum Normannorum — Campania. Berlin: Weidmann. (in Latin)
- Lanzoni, Francesco (1927). Le diocesi d'Italia dalle origini al principio del secolo VII (an. 604). Faenza: F. Lega. (in Italian)
- Mattei-Cerasoli, Leone (1919). "Da archivii e biblioteche: Di alcuni vescovi poco noti". (in Italian). In: Archivio storico per le province Neapolitane 44 (Napoli: Luigi Lubrano 1919). pp. 310-335.
- Ughelli, Ferdinando; Coleti, NIccolo (1721). Italia sacra sive De episcopis Italiæ, et insularum adjacentium (in Latin). Vol. Tomus septimus (7). Venice: apud Sebastianum Coleti. pp. 464–485.
- Volpi, Giuseppe (1752). Cronologia de' vescovi Pestani ora detti di Capaccio. (in Italian) seconda edizione. Napoli: Giovanni Riccio, 1752.
