= Ragona =

Ragona is a surname. Notable people with the surname include:

- Alfredo Ragona (born 1922), Greek football player
- Camillo Ragona (1604–1677), Italian Roman Catholic prelate
- Ubaldo Ragona (1916–1987), Italian film director and screenwriter
