= Roberto Almagno =

Italian artist

- Born: Aquino, Italy
- Education: Academy of Fine Art, Instituto d’Arte
- Known for: Sculpture

Roberto Almagno (born in Aquino) is an Italian artist based in Rome who sculpts exclusively with wood. Almagno trained under sculptors Giuseppe Mazzullo and Pericle Fazzini at the Instituo d’Arte (1968-1971) and the Academy of Fine Art in Rome (1972). His work was included in the 58th edition of the Venice Biennale.

== Early life and career ==
Almagno was born into a family of blacksmiths. He grew up in a small town in the southern part of Lazio, the birthplace of Tommaso D'Aquino. In a 2015 i-ItalyTV interview, he describes it as "a village surrounded by woods." He began working with clay, plaster, and stone, until the early 80’s when his artistic explorations progressively brought him to work with new materials such as wood, which he would source from the forest near his house. Almagno elaborates, "And that's where everything started by observing the light. The branches the plastic values that I detected in the woods. But above all by studying the branches. I have always tried to give sculpture a semiotic value, to trace a space. This is very important to me."

Painstakingly straightening the wood over many hours, he uses the ancient technique of moisture and heat to bend the wood into elegiac and timeless shapes.

Almagno's first solo show was in 1976, at the Arte Idee Gallery in Italy.

He has exhibited his work in numerous galleries and museums, including solo shows at venues like the Carlo Bilotti Museum in Rome, the Museum of Contemporary Sculpture in Matera at Palazzo Venezia, and the Pericle Fazzini Museum.

== Reception ==
Writing about Almagno's solo exhibition From Nature to Sculpture (2015) for La Voce di New York, Vincenza Di Maggio concluded "The most curious aspect of his sculptural work is the way that it so effortlessly hovers in space, as if freed from gravity. Using a secret technique which the artist does not wish to reveal, he physically connects the elements of his installation in such a subtle way that they seem to elegantly, weightlessly, mystically lift from the ground and gracefully float above and around one another."

Reviewing Almagno's second solo show Suspended in Space (2022) for Wallpaper, Jessica Klingelfuss wrote of the exhibition's exploration of boldness and levity "It’s a breath of fresh of air to see an artist embracing creative duality with such finesse."

== Collections ==
Almagno's work is in public and private collections in the US, Germany, Austria, Turkey, England, Switzerland and Japan as well as Collection of Contemporary Art, Ministry of Foreign Affairs, Rome; BNL Collection of Contemporary Art, Rome; Museum of Contemporary and Modern Art, Michetti Foundation, Francavilla al Mare; Collezione Valadier, Rome; Luisa Longo, Bologna; Luigi de Simone, Rome; Enzo Spadon, Milan.
