= Francesco Maria Brancaccio =

Italian Catholic cardinal

His Eminence Francesco Maria Brancaccio
- Cardinal-Bishop of Porto e Santa Rufina
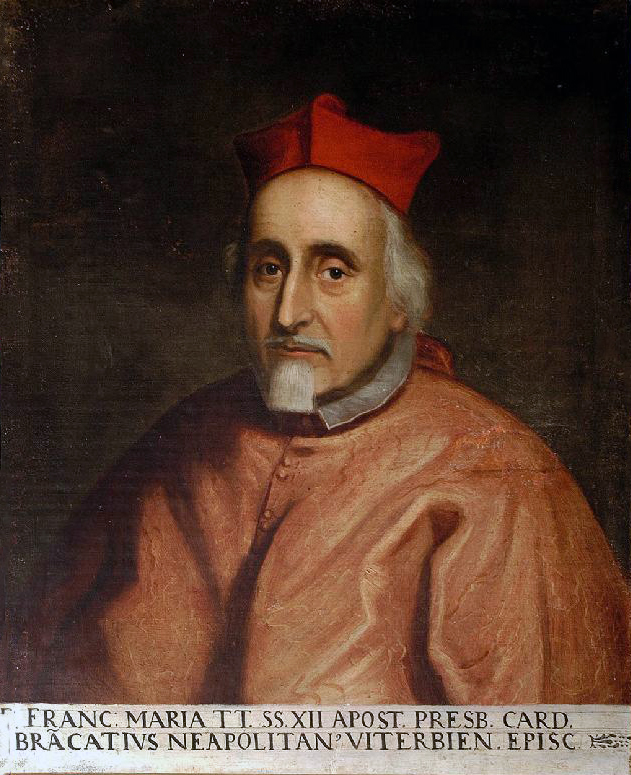
- Church: Catholic Church
- Diocese: Diocese of Viterbo
- In office: 1671–1675
- Predecessor: Marzio Ginetti
- Successor: Ulderico Carpegna

Orders
- Consecration: 8 September 1627 by Cosimo de Torres
- Created cardinal: 28 November 1633
- Rank: Cardinal-Bishop

Personal details
- Born: 15 April 1592 Canneto, near Bari, Kingdom of Naples
- Died: 9 January 1675 (aged 82) Rome

Francesco Maria Brancaccio (15 April 1592, in Canneto, near Bari – 9 January 1675) was an Italian Catholic cardinal.

== Naples ==
Brancaccio was born on 15 April 1592, the son of Baron Muzio II Brancaccio, governor of Apulia and Zenobia in the Kingdom of Naples. He was educated by the Jesuits in Naples. He was ordained there as a priest in 1619 and was rose through local ecclesiastic ranks until 1627 when he became Bishop of Capaccio which was then within the Kingdom of Naples. On 8 Sep 1627, he was consecrated bishop by Cosimo de Torres, Cardinal-Priest of San Pancrazio, with Giuseppe Acquaviva, Titular Archbishop of Thebae, and Francesco Nappi (bishop), Bishop of Polignano, serving as co-consecrators. While a bishop, he came into conflict with the local foot guards with whom he had a disagreement about local ecclesiastic jurisdiction. When the disagreement was elevated to armed conflict, a castrato in Brancaccio's employ killed the captain of the guard. The Vice-King ordered the bishop to stand trial and he obeyed; making arrangements to travel to Naples to give his account. But rather than travel to Naples he fled in a felucca towards Rome and upon arrival sought an audience with Pope Urban VIII to explain his side of the story. Urban agreed to defend the bishop and a furious Kingdom of Naples took custody of all the wealth and assets of Brancaccio's bishopric.

Pope Urban absolved Brancaccio of any crime and ordered that he be returned to Capaccio but the Viceroy in Naples opposed it and urged the pope to send him elsewhere. The Pope, in need of more cardinals loyal to the Barberini cause, instead kept Brancaccio in Rome and he was elevated to the rank of cardinal in his consistory of 28 November 1633.

== Cardinalate ==
Now as a cardinal, there were few who would publicly speak ill of Brancaccio, though they may have wanted to. He was restored to his bishopric where he remained until 1635 when yet another conflict with yet another Viceroy saw him resign. While in Naples he worked closely with cardinals Francesco Boncompagni and Ippolito Aldobrandini.

He became Bishop of Viterbo in 1638; then he became cardinal-bishop of Sabina (1666–68), of Frascati (1668–71), and finally of Porto e Santa Rufina (1671–75). He attended the papal conclaves of 1644, 1655, 1667 and 1669, which elected popes Innocent X, Alexander VII, Clement IX and Clement X respectively.

== Patron of the arts ==
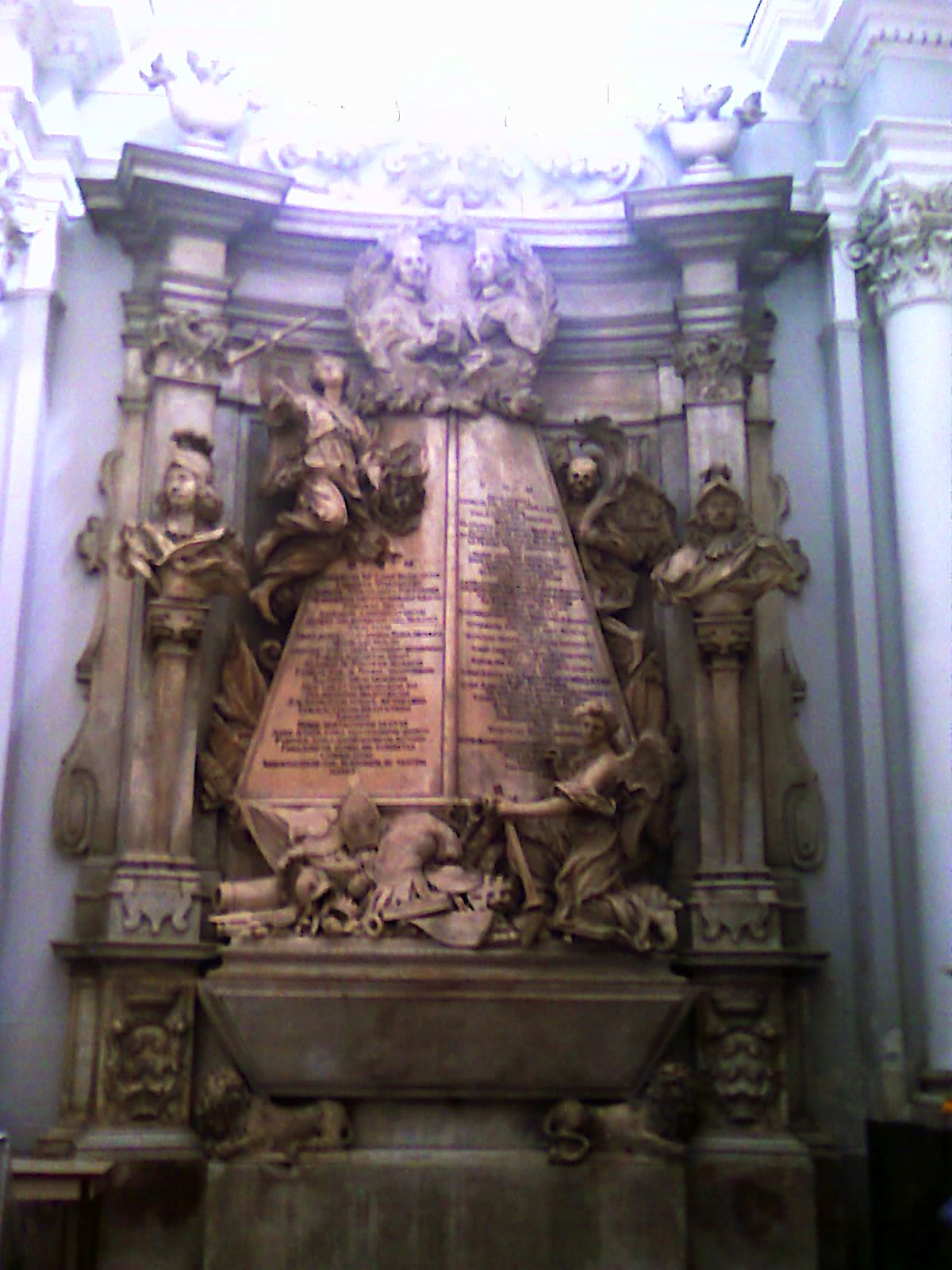
Grave of Francesco Brancaccio

During his time in Rome, he formed the Biblioteca Brancacciana (which later moved to Naples and became that city's first public library – it is now part of the National Library of Naples) and housed the artist Salvator Rosa.

In 1642, Giovanni Gentile dedicated a teaching-collection of music entitled Solfeggiamenti et ricercari a due voci (Solfèges and ricercari for two voices – Lodovico Grignani, Rome, 1642) to him. The frontispiece gives him as "CARD. FRANCESCO MARIA / BRANCACCIO. / VESCOVO DI VITERBO" ("Cardinal Francesco Maria Brancaccio, bishop of Viterbo") and in the appendices is a canon in two voices "Cavato dalle lettere vocali del nome, e cognome / DELL'EMINENTISSIMO E REVERENDISSIMO / CARDINALE BRANCACCIO" ("Based on the vocal letters of the name and surname of the most eminent and most reverend / cardinal Brancaccio").

== Episcopal succession ==
Episcopal succession of Francesco Maria Brancaccio

While bishop, he was the principal consecrator of:

- Loreto Di Franco (De Franchis), Bishop of Capri (1634);
- Miguel Juan Balaguer Camarasa, Bishop of Malta (1635);
- Domenico Ravenna, Bishop of Nicastro (1635);
- Luigi Pappacoda, Bishop of Capaccio (1635);
- Gaetano Cossa, Archbishop of Otranto (1635);
- Francesco Antonio Porpora, Bishop of Montemarano (1635);
- Ascenzio Guerrieri, Bishop of Castellaneta (1635);
- Cherubino Manzoni, Bishop of Lavello (1635);
- Bartolomeo Frigerio, Bishop of Venosa (1635);
- Pietro Magri (bishop), Bishop of Policastro (1635);
- Ascanio Turamini, Bishop of Grosseto (1637);
- Carlo Maranta, Bishop of Giovinazzo (1637);
- Domenico Giordani, Bishop of Isernia (1637);
- Giovanni Battista Falesi, Bishop of Mottola (1638);
- Gaspare Conturla, Bishop of Venosa (1638);
- Francesco Tontori (Tontolo), Bishop of Ischia (1638);
- Felice Tamburelli, Bishop of Sora (1638);
- Simone Carafa Roccella, Archbishop of Acerenza e Matera (1638);
- Juan Pastor, Bishop of Crotone (1638);
- Camillo Ragona, Bishop of Acerno (1644);
- Alessandro Rossi, Bishop of Ariano (1650);
- Raffaele de Palma, Bishop of Oria (1650);
- Filippo Cesarini, Bishop of Montepeloso (1655);
- Orazio degli Albizzi, Bishop of Volterra (1655);
- Giuseppe de Rossi, Bishop of Umbriatico (1655);
- Francisco Camps de la Carrera y Molés, Bishop of Bosa (1655);
- Maxmilián Rudolf Schleinitz, Bishop of Litoměřice (1655);
- Jean Caramuel y Lobkowitz, Bishop of Satriano e Campagna (1657);
- Giovanni Montoja de Cardona, Bishop of Gallipoli (1659);
- Michelangelo Vaginari, Bishop of Giovinazzo (1659);
- Antonio Ricciulli (iuniore), Bishop of Umbriatico (1659);
- Giovanni Carlo Valentini, Bishop of Città Ducale (1659);
- Carlo de Angelis, Bishop of L'Aquila (1663);
- Antonio Cervini, Bishop of Montepulciano (1663);
- Paolo Carafa, Bishop of Aversa (1665);
- Tommaso Acquaviva d'Aragona, Bishop of Bitonto (1668);
- Giuseppe Spinucci, Bishop of Penne e Atri (1668);
- Fulgenzio Arminio Monforte, Bishop of Nusco (1669);
- Marcantonio Vincentini, Bishop of Foligno (1669);
- Filippo Alferio Ossorio, Bishop of Fondi (1669);
- Giovanni Antonio Geloso, Bishop of Patti (1669);
- Vincenzo Maria da Silva, Bishop of Policastro (1671);
- John Brenan (archbishop), Bishop of Waterford and Lismore (1671);

and the principal co-consecrator of:

- Placido Padiglia, Bishop of Lavello (1627);
- Tommaso d'Ancora (Ariconi), Bishop of Mottola (1630);
- Giovan Battista Curiale (Correale), Bishop of Nicastro (1632); and
- Marc'Antonio Verità, Bishop of Ossero (1633).

== References and notes ==
Catholic Church titles
Preceded by Pedro de Mata y Haro	Bishop of Capaccio; 1627–1635	Succeeded by Luigi Pappacoda
Preceded by Desiderio Scaglia	Cardinal-Priest of Santi XII Apostoli; 1634–1663	Succeeded by Paluzzo Paluzzi Altieri Degli Albertoni
Preceded by Alessandro Cesarini (iuniore)	Bishop of Viterbo e Tuscania; 1638–1670	Succeeded by Stefano Brancaccio
Preceded by Giovanni Battista Maria Pallotta	Cardinal-Priest of San Lorenzo in Lucina; 1663–1666	Succeeded by Stefano Durazzo
Preceded by Marzio Ginetti	Cardinal-Bishop of Sabina; 1666–1668	Succeeded by Giulio Gabrielli
Preceded by Giovanni Battista Maria Pallotta	Cardinal-Bishop of Frascati; 1668-1671	Succeeded by Ulderico Carpegna
Preceded by Marzio Ginetti	Cardinal-Bishop of Porto e Santa Rufina; 1671–1675	Succeeded by Ulderico Carpegna
