= Tommaso d'Ancora =

Italian Catholic bishop (1583–1656)

Most Reverend Tommaso d'Ancora
- Archbishop of Trani
- Church: Catholic Church
- Archdiocese: Archdiocese of Trani
- In office: 1635–1656
- Predecessor: Diego Alvarez (bishop)
- Successor: Tommaso de Sarria
- Previous post: Bishop of Mottola (1630–1634)

Orders
- Consecration: 15 September 1630 by Francesco Maria Brancaccio

Personal details
- Born: 1583 Salerno, Italy
- Died: 1656 (age 73) Trani, Italy

Tommaso d'Ancora, C.R. or Tommaso d'Ariconi (1583–1656) was a Roman Catholic prelate who served as Archbishop of Trani (1635–1656) and Bishop of Mottola (1630–1634).

== Biography ==
Tommaso d'Ancora was born in Salerno, Italy in 1583 and ordained a priest in the Congregation of Clerics Regular of the Divine Providence. On 12 February 1630, he was selected as Bishop of Mottola and confirmed by Pope Urban VIII on 9 September 1630. On 15 September 1630, he was consecrated bishop by Laudivio Zacchia, Cardinal-Priest of San Pietro in Vincoli, with Francesco Maria Brancaccio, Bishop of Capaccio, and Martín de León Cárdenas, Bishop of Trivento, serving as co-consecrators. On 21 July 1634, he was selected as Archbishop of Trani and confirmed by Pope Urban VIII on 8 January 1635. He served as Archbishop of Trani until his death in 1656.

== Episcopal succession ==
While bishop, d'Ancora was the principal co-consecrator of:

- Pietro Corsetto, Bishop of Cefalù (1638); and
- Jacobus Philippus Tomasini, Bishop of Novigrad (1642).

== External links and additional sources ==
- Cheney, David M. "Diocese of Mottola (Motula)". Catholic-Hierarchy.org. (for Chronology of Bishops)}
- Chow, Gabriel. "Titular Episcopal See of Mottola (Italy)". GCatholic.org. (for Chronology of Bishops)}
- Cheney, David M. "Archdiocese of Trani-Barletta-Bisceglie (-Nazareth)". Catholic-Hierarchy.org. (for Chronology of Bishops)}
- Chow, Gabriel. "Archdiocese of Trani-Barletta-Bisceglie (Italy)". GCatholic.org. (for Chronology of Bishops)

Catholic Church titles
Preceded by Serafino Rinaldo de Nuceria	Bishop of Mottola; 1630–1634	Succeeded by Giovanni Battista Falesi
Preceded by Diego Alvarez (bishop)	Archbishop of Trani; 1635–1656	Succeeded by Tommaso de Sarria
