= Biago Proto de Rubeis =

Most Reverend Biagio Proto de Rossi
- Archbishop of Messina
- Church: Catholic Church
- Diocese: Archdiocese of Messina
- In office: 1626–1646
- Predecessor: Andrea Mastrillo
- Successor: Simone Carafa Roccella

Orders
- Consecration: 8 November 1626 by Card Giulio Cesare Sacchetti

Personal details
- Born: 1578 Patti, Italy
- Died: 7 April 1646 (age 68) Milazzo, Italy

Biago Proto de Rubeis or Biagio Proto de Rossi (1578 – 7 April 1646) was a Catholic prelate who served as Archbishop of Messina (1626–1646).

== Biography ==
Biagio Proto de Rossi was born in Patti, Sicily in about 1578, son of Antonello Proto and Diana Rosso. His mother was the sister of Luciano Rosso, bishop of Mazara, who took care of the ecclesiastical career of Biago, appointing him Canon of the Cathedral of Mazara. Biago earned a doctorate in utroque iure in about 1602 in Messina. At the death of his uncle, on 28 October 1602, he succeeded to be appointed vicar capitular against the will of the Chapter: he ruled the diocese of Mazara until the appointment of the new bishop in 1604. He later worked in the Apostolic Nunciature to Spain.

On 20 July 1626, he was appointed new Archbishop of Messina upon request of Philip IV of Spain, who had the advowson to present to the Pope the nominee for such office. The episcopal consecration followed on 8 November in San Giovanni dei Fiorentini by the hands of Cardinal Giulio Cesare Sacchetti. He received the pallium on next 16 November.

Biagio Proto was accused by people and by the Senate of Messina of using his jurisdictional powers for extortions, and of avarice and simony. He was summoned in Rome in 1632, and Maraldo Cellesio was sent to Messina to investigate. The result of the investigation supported the charges; however, Biagio Proto was acquitted in 1639 and returned to Messina to rule his diocese.

He died on 7 April 1646 in Milazzo, and his remains were moved and buried in the Cathedral of Messina, where his tomb is still visible.

== Episcopal succession ==
While bishop, he was the principal consecrator of:

- Pietro Corsetto, Bishop of Cefalù (1638);
- Francesco d'Elia e Rossi, Bishop of Siracusa (1639);
- Giovanni Torresiglia, Archbishop of Monreale (1644);

and the principal co-consecrator of:

- Ottavio Branciforte, Bishop of Cefalù (1633);
- Diego Requeséns, Titular Archbishop of Cartagine (1637);
- Prospero Spínola, Bishop of Luni e Sarzana (1637);
- Jerónimo Domín Funes, Bishop of Gaeta (1637);
- Giovanni Battista Falesi, Bishop of Mottola (1638);
- Gaspare Conturla, Bishop of Venosa (1638);
- Francesco Tontori, Bishop of Ischia (1638); and
- Felice Tamburelli, Bishop of Sora (1638).

== External links and additional sources ==
- Cheney, David M. "Archdiocese of Messina-Lipari-Santa Lucia del Mela". Catholic-Hierarchy.org. (for Chronology of Bishops) ^{[self-published]}
- Chow, Gabriel. "Archdiocese of Messina-Lipari-Santa Lucia del Mela". GCatholic.org. (for Chronology of Bishops) ^{[self-published]}

Catholic Church titles
Preceded by Andrea Mastrillo	Archbishop of Messina; 1626–1646	Succeeded by Simone Carafa Roccella
