= Sant'Agata de' Goti, Rome =

Sant'Agata de' Goti
- Sant'Agata in Subura, Sant'Agata in Monasterio, Sant'Agata de Caballo
- Chiesa di Sant'Agata dei Goti
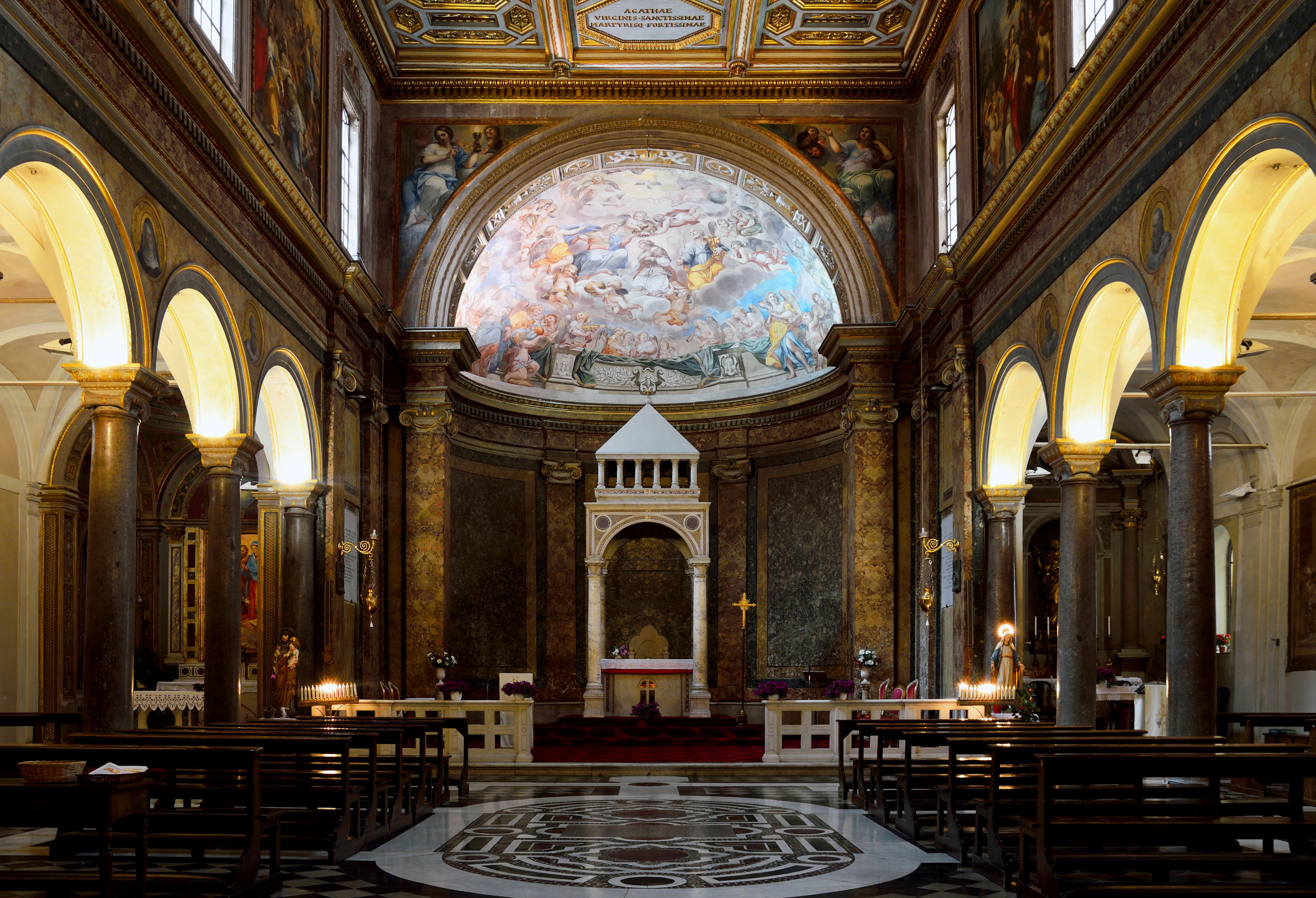
- Interior of the church
- Click on the map for a fullscreen view
- 41°53′47.35″N 12°29′22.17″E
- Location: Via Mazzarino 16, Rome
- Country: Italy
- Denomination: Roman Catholic
- Previous denomination: Arianism (until AD 592/593)
- Tradition: Latin Rite
- Religious institute: Stigmatines

History
- Status: Titular church Conventual Church of the General Curia of the Congregation of the Sacred Stigmata
- Founder: Ricimer
- Dedication: Agatha of Sicily

Architecture
- Style: Baroque
- Groundbreaking: c. 460

Administration
- Diocese: Rome

Sant'Agata dei Goti is a titular church in Rome, Italy, dedicated to the martyr Agatha of Sicily and the home of the Congregation of the Sacred Stigmata’s (Stigmatines) General Curia. The diaconia is assigned to Cardinal Raymond Leo Burke, patron emeritus of the Sovereign Military Order of Malta. (It became pro hac vice a presbyteral title in 2021 when Cardinal Burke opted to become a cardinal priest.)

== History ==
The church was built by Ricimer for the Goths c. 460. The Goths were Arians, so when Arianism was suppressed in Rome, the building was taken over by the Catholic Church, in 591 or 592, and rededicated by Pope Gregory the Great. It was restored in the 9th century, and a Benedictine monastery was founded next to it. The apse of the church collapsed in 1589, and it was partially rebuilt in 1633, without major changes to the building itself apart from the new apse. The small courtyard outside the church was laid out at this time.

The church has been served by the Stigmatines since 1926. Their generalate is adjacent to it. It is the only Arian church that has been preserved in Rome.

== Exterior ==
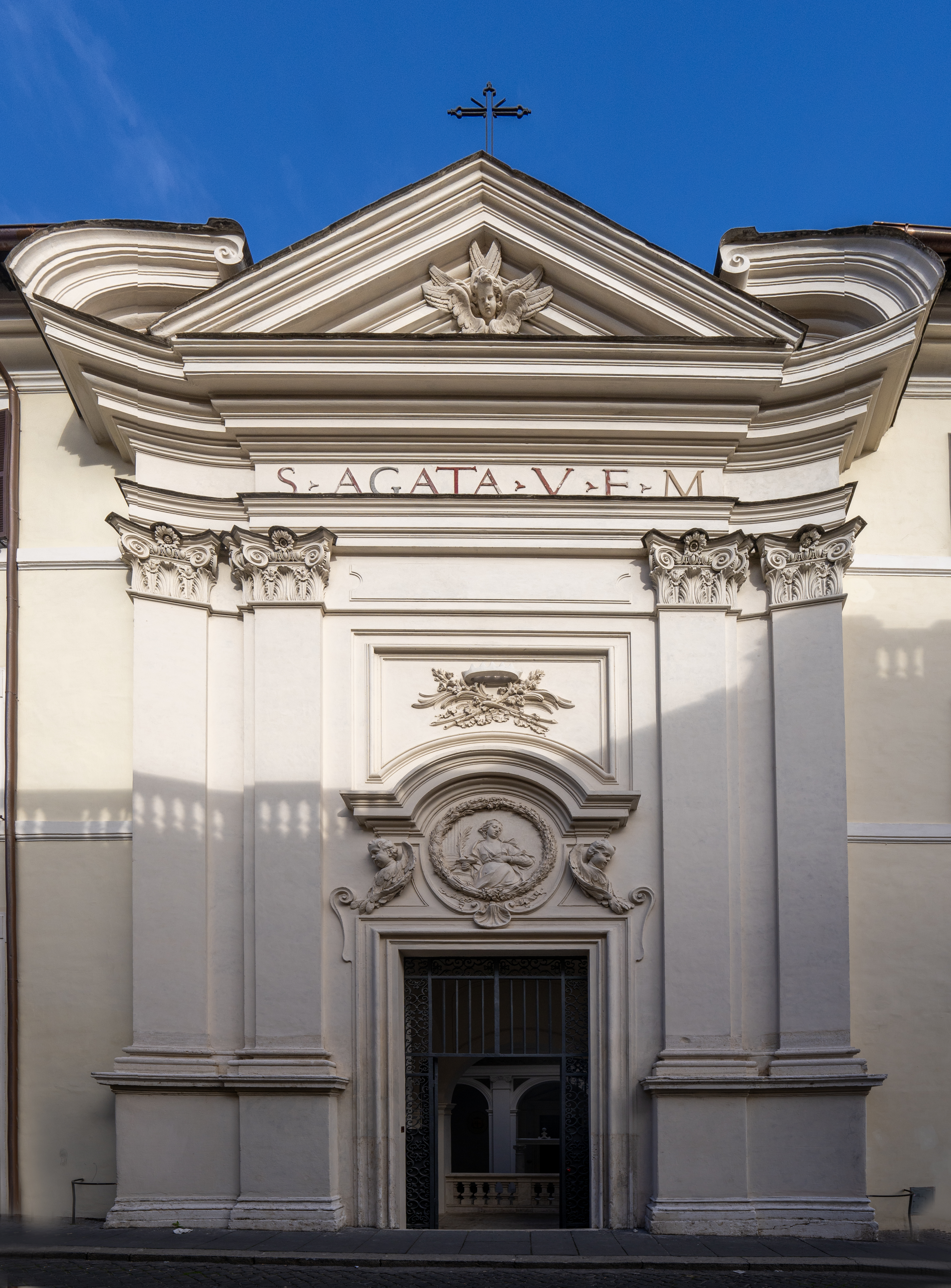
Exterior

The Romanesque campanile was built in the 12th century. The façade was rebuilt by Francesco Ferrari in 1729. The relief above the door shows St. Agatha holding her severed breasts on a plate; her torturers severed her breasts when she refused to renounce her faith in Christ.

The entrance from Via Mazzarino opens on a 17th-century courtyard. From 1836 to 1926, it belonged to the Irish College. Cardinal Paul Cullen, a former Rector of the Irish College, modelled the church of the Holy Cross College in Clonliffe in Dublin on the plans of St Agatha's.

== Interior ==
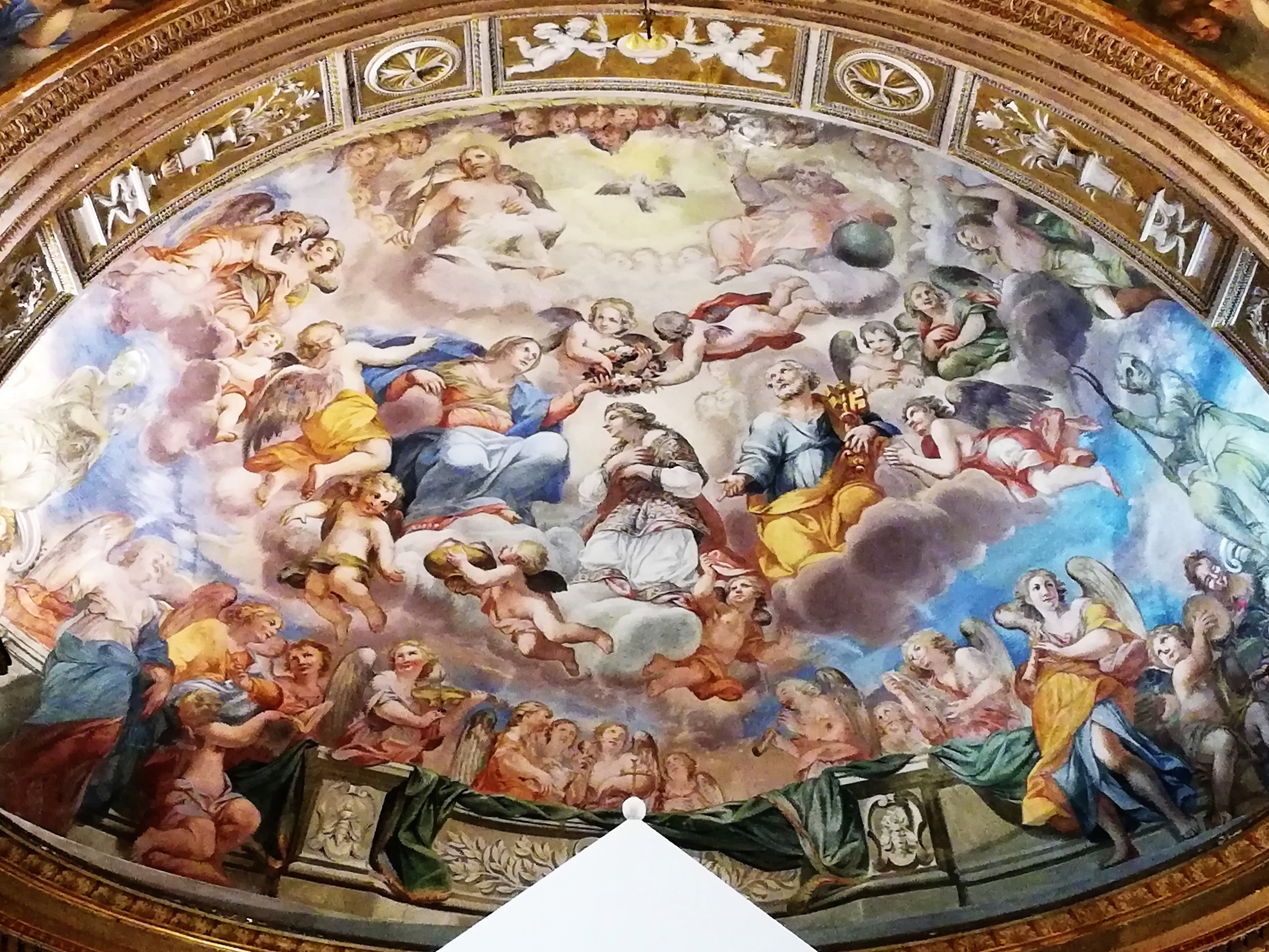
Apse fresco depicting Glory of St Agatha

Although it was redecorated in the Baroque style and has some 19th-century additions, it is still possible to see traces of the 5th-century plan, which was a basilica with three naves. The granite columns separating the naves are ancient.

The fresco in the apse shows the Glory of St Agatha, made by Paolo Gismondi in the 17th century. A cherub bring the severed breasts of Agatha on a platter to the Virgin as a demonstration of her sacrifice. There is a 12th- or 13th-century canopy above the altar, reassembled and erected here in 1933. It has four columns of pavonazzetto marble, all decorated with Cosmatesque mosaic, and a temple roof. The former canopy was destroyed in 1589; fragments can be seen in the ceiling of the main chapel on the left-hand side.

The 15th-century Cosmatesque pavement in the middle of the nave has an unusual, but very nice, design. It is a very late example of the style. Cardinal Francesco Barberini paid for the wooden ceiling. The rectangular windows were installed in the 17th century at the request of the Cardinals Francesco and Antonio Barberini. By the altar of St Agatha is a large statue of the saint.

Ricimer, who was buried in the church, had a mosaic installed. This was unfortunately destroyed in 1589, when the apse collapsed. The Greek humanist John Lascaris (died 1535) is interred in the church and the heart of Daniel O'Connell, the 'Liberator' (died Genoa 1847), was buried here. The heart disappeared in vague circumstances during renovation work around 1925.

== Liturgy ==
The feast of the Greek martyrs whose relics are preserved here is on 2 December. It is usually celebrated with an evening Mass with the liturgy of the Byzantine Catholic rite.

Other important feasts are that of St Agatha on 5 February and St Gaspar Bertoni, founder of the Stigmatines, on 12 June.

== Titulars ==
Pro illa vice, literally "for that turn", indicates a temporary appointment. In commendam indicates that a cardinal who holds one title is also granted oversight of another vacant title.

- Giovanni (circa 1030 or 1025–1036)
- Oderisio (or Oderisius) (1059–1088)
- Oderisio dei Conti di Sangro (1112–1137)
- Vitale Savelli (1130?–?)
- Oderisio dei Conti di Sangro (1131–1137), pseudocardinal of Antipope Anacletus II
- Bernard de Garves (1310–1316)
- Galeotto Tarlati de Petramala (1378–1388)
- Louis of Bar (1397–1409), pseudocardinal of Antipope Benedict XIII
- Bartolomé Martí (1496–1500)
- Ludovico Podocathor, pro illa vice (1500–1504)
- Gabriele de' Gabrielli (1505–1507)
- Vacant (1507–1517)
- Ercole Rangone (1517–1527)
- Pirro Gonzaga (1528–1529)
- Francesco Pisani (1529–1545)
- Tiberio Crispo (1545–1551); pro illa vice (1551–1562)
- Fulvio Giulio della Corgna, pro illa vice (1562–1565)
- Giovanni Michele Saraceni, pro illa vice (1565)
- Giovanni Battista Cicala, pro illa vice (1565–1568)
- Tolomeo Gallio (1568–1587)
- Girolamo Mattei (1587)
- Benedetto Giustiniani (1587–1589)
- Federico Borromeo seniore (1589–1591)
- Charles de Lorraine (1591–1607)
- Luigi Capponi (1608–1620)
- Marcantonio Gozzadini, pro illa vice (1623)
- Ottavio Ridolfi, pro illa vice (1623–1624)
- Francesco Barberini (1624–1632)
- Antonio Barberini (1632–1642)
- Giulio Gabrielli (1642–1655)
- Giovanni Stefano Donghi (1655–1669)
- Friedrich von Hessen–Darmstadt (1670–1682)
- Girolamo Casanate (1682–1686)
- Felice Rospigliosi (1686–1688)
- Benedetto Pamphilj (1688–1693)
- Carlo Bichi (1693–1718)
- Lorenzo Altieri (1718–1730)
- Carlo Colonna (1730–1739)
- Carlo Maria Marini (1739–1741)
- Alessandro Albani (1741–1743)
- Agapito Mosca (1743–1760)
- Girolamo Colonna di Sciarra (1760–1763)
- Prospero Colonna di Sciarra (1763–1765)
- Luigi Maria Torregiani (1765–1777)
- Domenico Orsini d'Aragona (1777–1779)
- Andrea Negroni (1779–1789)
- Raniero Finocchietti (1789–1793)
- Ludovico Flangini Giovanelli (1794–1800)
- Ercole Consalvi (1800–1817)
- Agostino Rivarola (1817–1826)
- Juan Francisco Marco y Catalán (1829–1841)
- Giacomo Antonelli (1847–1868); in commendam (1868–1876)
- Frédéric de Falloux du Coudray (1877–1879)
- Giuseppe Pecci (1879–1890)
- Vacant (1890–1894)
- Andreas Steinhuber (1894–1907)
- Gaetano Bisleti (1911–1928), pro illa vice (1928–1937)
- Konrad von Preysing, pro illa vice (1946–1950)
- John Francis D'Alton, pro illa vice (1953–1963)
- Enrico Dante (1965–1967)
- Silvio Oddi (1969–1979), pro illa vice (1979–2001)
- Tomáš Špidlík (2003–2010)
- Raymond Leo Burke (2010-)
