= Bernard Joseph McLaughlin =

Catholic bishop (1912–2015)

His Excellency, The Most Reverend Bernard Joseph McLaughlin
- Auxiliary Bishop of Buffalo
- Church: Catholic Church
- See: Buffalo
- In office: 1968–1988
- Other post: Titular Bishop of Mottola (1968–2015)

Orders
- Ordination: December 21, 1935

Personal details
- Born: November 19, 1912 Buffalo, New York, U.S.
- Died: January 5, 2015 (aged 102) Tonawanda, New York, U.S.
- Motto: Veritatem facientes in caritate (Live the truth in love)

Bernard Joseph McLaughlin (November 19, 1912 – January 5, 2015) was an American bishop of the Catholic Church. He served as the Auxiliary Bishop of Buffalo and also held the titular see of Mottola.

== Biography ==
=== Early life and education ===
McLaughlin was born in North Tonawanda, New York on November 19, 1912. He was the son of Michael Henry McLaughlin and Mary Agnes (née Curran) McLaughlin. He was baptized at Ascension Church in North Tonawanda in 1912. The McLaughlin family later moved to Visitation Parish in Buffalo, New York where he attended the parish school. In 1925, he entered the Preparatory Seminary in the Diocese of Buffalo and was a member of its first graduation class. Five years later he left Buffalo to attend the Urban College for the Propagation of the Faith in Rome, Italy.

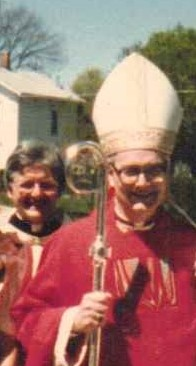
Rev. Lawrence Milby and Buffalo Aux. Bishop Bernard McLaughlin, Gowanda, NY, 1988

=== Ordination and ministry ===
McLaughlin was ordained a priest in St John Lateran Basilica, Rome, on December 21, 1935. He continued further studies and remained in Rome for another six months before returning to Buffalo. On August 14, 1936, he was named as assistant at St. Joseph New Cathedral. He remained there until June 1942 when he was appointed secretary of the diocesan Tribunal. In 1946 he was appointed assistant chancellor and soon after became vice chancellor of the diocese. He became chancellor of the diocese on December 16, 1953. In November 1950 he was chosen to establish the new parish of Coronation of the Blessed Virgin Mary on Buffalo's West Side. He continued his duties at the Chancery during his time as pastor and in June 1961 was transferred from Coronation to become pastor of Blessed Sacrament Parish, Kenmore, New York. He remained at Blessed Sacrament until 1972 when he was named pastor of St. John the Baptist Parish in Kenmore.

McLaughlin received several honors from the Vatican. On April 6, 1950, Pope Pius XII made him a Private Chamberlain with the title of Very Reverend Monsignor. Three years later he was raised to the rank of Domestic Prelate with the title of Right Reverend Monsignor. On December 4, 1967, Pope Paul made him a Prothonotary Apostolic. In addition to his work as chancellor, Bishop McLaughlin has been a member of the board of diocesan Consultors and a vicar general.

=== Auxiliary Bishop of Buffalo ===
McLaughlin was appointed as Auxiliary Bishop of Buffalo on December 28, 1968, and received his episcopal consecration on January 6, 1969, from Pope Paul VI. This was the first time a diocesan priest from Buffalo was appointed a bishop by a pope. He was simultaneously named the Titular Bishop of Mottola.

He also served as an advocate of the diocesan Tribunal, professor of Labor Ethics at the Diocesan Labor Management College, and founder of several parish Labor schools. In addition, he served as chaplain of the Catholic Guild for the Blind, and was a secretary of the Diocesan Synod. On September 14, 1968, he was made a Knight of the Holy Sepulchre at St. Patrick's Cathedral in New York City by Archbishop Terence Cooke.

== Last years and death ==
Pope John Paul II accepted McLaughlin's letter of retirement on January 15, 1988, according to church law, which requires bishops to submit their letters of retirement on their 75th birthday. When his retirement was accepted, he became Auxiliary Bishop Emeritus of Buffalo.

McLaughlin died on January 5, 2015, in Tonawanda, New York, at the age of 102.

== See also ==
- Roman Catholic Diocese of Buffalo

Catholic Church titles
New creation	— TITULAR — Bishop of Mottola; 1968–2015	Succeeded by Angelo De Donatis
Preceded by –	Auxiliary Bishop of Buffalo; 1968–1988	Succeeded by –
