= Felice Tamburelli =

Most Reverend Felice Tamburelli
- Bishop of Sora
- Church: Catholic Church
- Diocese: Diocese of Sora
- In office: 14 March 1638
- Predecessor: Paolo Benzoni
- Successor: Agostino de' Belli

Orders
- Consecration: 14 March 1638 by Francesco Maria Brancaccio

Personal details
- Died: 1656 Sora, Lazio, Italy

Felice Tamburelli (died 1656) was a Roman Catholic prelate who served as Bishop of Sora (1638–1656).

== Biography ==
On 1 March 1638, Felice Tamburelli was appointed during the papacy of Pope Urban VIII as Bishop of Sora. On 14 March 1638, he was consecrated bishop by Francesco Maria Brancaccio, Cardinal-Priest of Santi XII Apostoli, with Biago Proto de Rubeis, Archbishop of Messina, and Giovanni Battista Altieri, Bishop Emeritus of Camerino, serving as co-consecrators. He served as Bishop of Sora until his death in 1656.

== External links and additional sources ==
- Cheney, David M. "Diocese of Sora-Cassino-Aquino-Portecorvino". Catholic-Hierarchy.org. (for Chronology of Bishops) ^{[self-published]}
- Chow, Gabriel. "Diocese of Sora-Cassino-Aquino-Portecorvino (Italy)". GCatholic.org. (for Chronology of Bishops) ^{[self-published]}

Catholic Church titles
Preceded by Paolo Benzoni	Bishop of Sora; 1638–1656	Succeeded by Agostino de' Belli
