= Apostolic Nunciature to Naples =

Former diplomatic post of the Holy See

The Apostolic Nunciature to Naples was an ecclesiastical office of the Catholic Church in the Kingdom of Naples. It was a diplomatic post of the Holy See, whose representative is called the Apostolic Nuncio with the rank of an ambassador.

== List of Apostolic Nuncios ==
=== 16th century ===
- Fabio Arcella (1528 - 1534)
- Tommaso Caracciolo (1534 - August 1535)
- Fabio Arcella (August 11, 1535 - April 1537)
- Francesco Guastaferro (April 1537 - 1541)
- Bartolomeo Capobianco (1541 - June 1544)
- Gerolamo Sauli (June 1544 - December 1545)
- Berardo de Santis (December 11, 1545 - May 1546)
- Bartolomeo Capobianco (May 1546 - November 1549)
- Bartolomeo Capranica (November 8, 1549 - ?)
- Paolo Fabio Cappelletto (? - 1554)
- Pietro Camaiano (October 12, 1554 - 1555)
- Marco Antonio Sauli (1555 - August 1558)
- Giulio Pavesi (August 1558 - June 1560)
- Paolo Odescalchi (June 15, 1560 - September 4, 1561)
- Nicolò Fieschi (September 4, 1561 - December 15, 1564)
- Antonio Scarampi (December 15, 1564 - May 15, 1566)
- Cipriano Pallavicini (May 15, 1566 - November 23, 1566)
- Paolo Odescalchi (January 15 1567 - February 27, 1568 appointed bishop of Penne)
- Cesare Brumano (February 1568 - November 18, 1570)
- Alessandro Simonetta (November 18, 1570 - November 9, 1572)
- Antonio Maria Sauli (November 9, 1572 - October 15, 1577)
- Lorenzo Campeggi (October 1577 - January 5, 1580)
- Fantino Petrignani (January 5, 1580 - February 9, 1581)
- Silvio Savelli (February 9, 1581 - June 2, 1585)
- Giulio Rossino (June 2, 1585 - July 1587)
- Marcantonio Bizzoni (July 10, 1587 - May 1589)
- Alessandro Glorieri (May 20, 1589 - May 1591)
- Germanico Malaspina (May 3, 1591 - December 21, 1591)
- Pietro Astorgio (December 21, 1591 - March 1592)

=== 17th century ===
- Jacopo Aldobrandini (March 1592 - 1605)
- Guglielmo Bastoni (December 1, 1605 - January 1609)
- Valeriano Muti (January 12, 1609 - 1610)
- Diodato Gentile (March 29, 1610 - April 1616 deceased)
- Paolo Emilio Filonardi (April 19, 1616 - March 26, 1621)
- Giovanni Battista Pamphilj (March 26, 1621 - March 1625)
- Lorenzo Tramallo (March 1625 - May 15, 1626) (ad interim)
- Antonio Diaz (March 31 or May 15, 1626 - 1627)
- Cesare Monti (April 17, 1627 - 1628)
- Alessandro Bichi (May 29, 1628 - June 1630 dismissed)
- Niccolò Enriquez de Herrera (June 8, 1630 - 1639)
- Lorenzo Tramallo (March 26, 1639 - November 25, 1644 dismissed)
- Emilio Bonaventura Altieri (November 25, 1644 - October 1652)
- Alessandro Sperelli (October 24, 1652 - September 1653)
- Giulio Spinola (October 4, 1653 - ?)
- Giulio Spinola (October 4, 1658 - July 10, 1665 appointed Apostolic Nuncio to Austria)
- Bernardino Rocci (June 16, 1665 - 1667)
- Marco Galli (February 19, 1668 - 1671)
- Marcantonio Vincentini (January 26, 1671 - 1682)
- Giulio Muzio (or Muti) Papazurri (1682 - 1690)
- Lorenzo Casoni (March 4, 1690 - 1702)

=== 18th century ===
- Giambattista Patrizi (February 17, 1702 - December 20, 1707 appointed general treasurer of the Apostolic Chamber)
- Alessandro Aldobrandini (December 20, 1707 - September 23, 1713 appointed nuncio to the Republic of Venice)
- Gerolamo Alessandro Vicentini (June 17, 1713 - August 5, 1723 deceased)
- Vincenzo Antonio Alemanni Nasi (December 2, 1723 - December 23, 1730 appointed apostolic nuncio to Spain)
- Raniero Felice Simonetti (December 23, 1730 - September 9, 1743 appointed vice-chamberlengo of the Apostolic Chamber)
- Luigi Gualterio (March 21, 1744 - March 2, 1754 appointed apostolic nuncio to France)
- Lazzaro Opizio Pallavicini (May 21, 1754 - February 9, 1760 appointed apostolic nuncio to Spain)
- Giuseppe Locatelli (January 11, 1760 - November 23, 1763 died)
- Guido Calcagnini (February 22, 1765 - May 20, 1776 created cardinal)
- Giuseppe Vincentini (January 23, 1776 - October 5, 1779 died)
- Sede vacante

=== 19th century ===
==== Kingdom of the Two Sicilies ====
- Sede vacante
- Alessandro Giustiniani (April 26, 1822 - April 24 1827 appointed Apostolic Nuncio to Portugal)
- Luigi Amat di San Filippo e Sorso (April 24, 1827 - November 13, 1832 appointed Apostolic Nuncio to Spain)
- Gabriele Ferretti (July 22, 1833 - May 23, 1837 appointed Bishop of Montefiascone)
- Fabio Maria Asquini (December 22, 1837 - March 4, 1839 appointed to the Curia in Rome)
- Camillo Di Pietro (July 27, 1839 - February 7, 1844 appointed Apostolic Nuncio to Portugal)
- Pietro Antonio Garibaldi (February 7, 1844 - September 30, 1850 appointed Apostolic Nuncio to France)
- Innocenzo Ferrieri (September 30, 1850 - June 16, 1856 appointed Apostolic Nuncio to Portugal)
- Pietro Gianelli (March 18, 1858 - September 6 1860)
- End of the Nunciature
