= Simone Carafa Roccella =

Italian Roman Catholic prelate (died 1676)

Most Reverend Simone Carafa Roccella
- Archbishop of Messina
- Church: Catholic Church
- Archdiocese: Archdiocese of Messina
- In office: 1647–1676
- Predecessor: Biagio Proto de Rossi
- Successor: Giuseppe Cigala

Orders
- Consecration: 12 September 1638 by Francesco Maria Brancaccio

Personal details
- Died: 22 March 1676 Messina, Italy

Simone Carafa Roccella, C.R. (died 22 March 1676) was a Roman Catholic prelate who served as Archbishop of Messina (1647–1676) and Archbishop of Acerenza e Matera (1638–1647).

== Biography ==
Simone Carafa Roccella was ordained a priest in the Congregation of Clerics Regular of the Divine Providence. On 30 August 1638, he was appointed during the papacy of Pope Urban VIII as Archbishop of Acerenza e Matera. On 12 September 1638, he was consecrated bishop by Francesco Maria Brancaccio, Cardinal-Priest of Santi XII Apostoli, with Tommaso Carafa, Bishop Emeritus of Vulturara e Montecorvino, and Giovanni Battista Altieri, Bishop Emeritus of Camerino, serving as co-consecrators. On 14 May 1647, he was selected as Archbishop of Messina and confirmed by Pope Innocent X on 16 September 1647. He served as Archbishop of Messina until his death on 22 March 1676.

== External links and additional sources ==
- Cheney, David M. "Archdiocese of Acerenza". Catholic-Hierarchy.org. (for Chronology of Bishops) ^{[self-published]}
- Chow, Gabriel. "Archdiocese of Acerenza (Italy)". GCatholic.org. (for Chronology of Bishops ^{[self-published]}
- Cheney, David M. "Archdiocese of Messina-Lipari-Santa Lucia del Mela". Catholic-Hierarchy.org. (for Chronology of Bishops) ^{[self-published]}
- Chow, Gabriel. "Archdiocese of Messina-Lipari-Santa Lucia del Mela (Italy)". GCatholic.org. (for Chronology of Bishops) ^{[self-published]}

Catholic Church titles
Preceded by Giovanni Domenico Spinola	Archbishop of Acerenza e Matera; 1638–1647	Succeeded by Giambattista Spínola
Preceded by Biagio Proto de Rossi	Archbishop of Messina; 1647–1676	Succeeded by Giuseppe Cigala
