= Giovanni Battista De Pace =

Roman Catholic prelate

Most Reverend Giovanni Battista De Pace
- Bishop of Capaccio
- Church: Catholic Church
- Diocese: Diocese of Capaccio
- In office: 1684–1698
- Predecessor: Andrea Bonito
- Successor: Vincenzo Corcione

Orders
- Consecration: 11 Jun 1684 by Alessandro Crescenzi (cardinal)

Personal details
- Born: 5 June 1627 Naples, Italy
- Died: 20 November 1698 (age 71) Capaccio, Italy

Giovanni Battista De Pace, C.O. (5 June 1627 – 20 November 1698) was a Roman Catholic prelate who served as Bishop of Capaccio (1684–1698).

== Biography ==
Giovanni Battista De Pace was born in Naples, Italy on 5 June 1627 and ordained a priest in the Oratory of Saint Philip Neri. On 5 June 1684, he was appointed during the papacy of Pope Innocent XI as Bishop of Capaccio. On 11 June 1684, he was consecrated bishop by Alessandro Crescenzi (cardinal), Cardinal-Priest of Santa Prisca, with Pier Antonio Capobianco, Bishop Emeritus of Lacedonia, and Francesco Maria Giannotti, Bishop of Segni, serving as co-consecrators. He served as Bishop of Capaccio until his death on 20 November 1698.

== External links and additional sources ==
- Cheney, David M. "Diocese of Vallo della Lucania". Catholic-Hierarchy.org. (for Chronology of Bishops) ^{[self-published]}
- Chow, Gabriel. "Diocese of Vallo della Lucania (Italy)". GCatholic.org. (for Chronology of Bishops) ^{[self-published]}

Catholic Church titles
Preceded by Andrea Bonito	Bishop of Capaccio; 1684–1698	Succeeded by Vincenzo Corcione
