= Stigmatines =

Latin Catholic congregation

Congregation of the Sacred Stigmata
- Congregatio a Sanctis Stigmatibus (Latin)
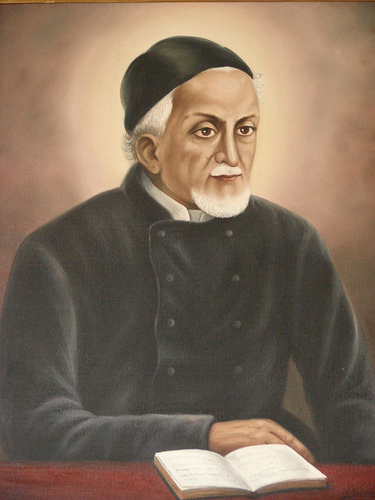
- Saint Gaspar Louis Bertoni
- Abbreviation: Post-nominal letters: C.S.S.
- Nickname: Stigmatines
- Formation: November 4, 1816; 209 years ago
- Founder: Saint Fr. Gaspar Louis Bertoni, C.S.S.
- Founded at: Verona, Italy
- Type: Clerical Religious Congregation of Pontifical Right for men
- Headquarters: General Motherhouse; Sant'Agata de' Goti, Via Mazzarino 16, Rome, Italy
- Members: 413 members (316 priests) as of 2020
- Motto: Latin: Euntes Docete; English: Go forth and teach
- Superior General: Fr. Silvano Nicoletto, C.S.S.
- Apostolate: Parish work
- Patron saints: Blessed Virgin Mary; Saint Joseph
- Parent organization: Roman Catholic Church
- Website: stigmatines.com

The Stigmatines, officially named the Congregation of the Sacred Stigmata (Latin: Congregatio a Sanctis Stigmatibus), is a Catholic clerical religious congregation of Pontifical Right for men (Priests and Brothers). The Stigmatine Congregation was founded on November 4, 1816 by Gaspar Bertoni, in Verona, Italy. Its members use the post-nominals C.S.S..

== History ==
The first written constitutions for the congregation were based on the constitutions of the Society of Jesus, a religious order founded by Ignatius of Loyola. Like the Jesuits, the congregation was intended as a missionary and educational ministry. The church where the Stigmatines were founded in Verona, Italy, was dedicated to the Stigmata of St. Francis of Assisi, from which the original title of the Community came. The patrons of the Stigmatine Congregation are the Holy Spouses, Mary and Joseph. The community's patronal feast is January 23, the Espousals of Mary and Joseph.

The growth of the community was slow. In 1905, the Stigmatines went to the United States in 1907, and in 1910, they started activities in Brazil. For nearly two centuries, the Stigmatines worked in China, Thailand, the Philippines and various countries in Africa and Latin America.

In 2002, the Stigmatines settled in India.

In June 2018, the city council of Waltham, Massachusetts, voted to take the 46 acres owned by the Stigmatines by eminent domain, for the purpose of building a new high school. The site included the Espousal Retreat Center, a conference center, and a retirement home for priests. Mayor Jeannette McCarthy stated that the property is valued at $25.4 million; the city offered $18 million. A statement on the Stigmatines' website states, "No one is doubting or discounting the need for a new high school in Waltham. We just don't believe the City should be able to end our existence here in Waltham because it covets our land for its own use." In December 2019, the parties resolved their dispute by the city council agreeing to pay a total of $29 million for the site.

In the Philippines, on 8 September 2021, Jessie Avenido (30 years old), Jestonie Avenido (29 years old) and Jerson Rey Avenido (28 years old), three brothers, members of the congregation, were ordained priests by archbishop Jose Cabantan in the Cathedral of Cagayan de Oro.

== Statistics ==
In 2012, they had 94 houses with 422 members, including 331 priests.

== Causes of Canonization ==
Saints

- Gaspare Luigi Bertoni (9 October 1777 – 12 June 1853), founder of the congregation, canonized on 1 November 1989

Venerables

- Emilio Recchia (19 February 1888 - 27 June 1969), professed priest, declared Venerable on 21 February 2020
- Roberto Giovanni (18 March 1903 - 11 January 1994), professed priest, declared Venerable on 27 October 2020

Servants of God

- Beniamino Miori (11 June 1883 - 23 May 1946), professed priest, declared as a Servant of God on 3 June 2017

== Congregation of the Sacred Stigmata of Our Lord Jesus Christ ==
=== Philippines ===
The impact of St. Gaspar Bertoni's legacy extended beyond Italy. On June 1, 1985, in collaboration with Manila Archbishop H.E. Jaime Lachica Cardinal Sin, D.D. and the Stigmatine Fathers & Brothers established the only church in the country and Asia dedicated to the Sacred Stigmata of Our Lord Jesus Christ. The Parish of the Five Wounds of Our Lord Jesus Christ, Municipality of Las Piñas, +Rev. Fr. Danilo Panato, CSS, became the inaugural Parish Priest. The Novena to the Five Wounds of Jesus Christ is prayed in the parish church every Friday (Day of devotion to the Five Wounds of Jesus Christ - with Ecclesiastical approval). The Parish Feast Day is joyously celebrated every Third Sunday of Easter (Approved by local ordinary).

Between year 1989 and 1991, the Stigmatine and Parish Community commissioned the original and venerated image of the Parish Titular Patron "Five Wounds of Jesus Christ." (Resurrected Jesus with His Five Glorious Wounds, depicted in the Gospel of John 20:24-29).

Further testament to the devotion inspired by St. Gaspar Bertoni occurred on January 14, 2012, when Most Rev. Jesse Eugenio Mercado, D.D., Bishop of the Diocese of Parañaque, elevated the church to a Diocesan Shrine of the Five Wounds of Our Lord Jesus Christ, the very first Shrine in Las Piñas City, +Rev. Fr. Dennis Jesus L. Batacandolo, CSS, assumed the role of the first Shrine Rector, embodying the enduring love and devotion of people to the Five Wounds of Jesus Christ in modern times. The Chaplet of the Five Wounds of Jesus Christ is prayed in the Shrine every day except on Friday (Daily prayer to the Five Wounds of Jesus Christ - with Nihil Obstat and Imprimatur of Bishop of Parañaque.)

== Stigmatine Apostolates ==
- the instruction of the Youth
- the preaching of retreats and popular missions
- the assistance in clergy formation

== Fathers General ==
- Peter Vignola
- Very Rev. John B. Tomasi
- Andrea Meschi (2000—present)
