= Andrea Mastrillo =

Italian Roman Catholic prelate

Most Reverend Andrea Mastrillo
- Archbishop of Messina
- Church: Catholic Church
- Archdiocese: Archdiocese of Messina
- In office: 1618–1624
- Predecessor: Pedro Ruiz Valdivieso
- Successor: Biagio Proto de Rossi

Orders
- Consecration: 20 May 1618 by Giovanni Garzia Mellini

Personal details
- Born: 1563 Palermo, Italy
- Died: 1624 (age 61) Messina, Italy

Andrea Mastrillo (1563–1624) was a Roman Catholic prelate who served as Archbishop of Messina (1618–1624).

== Biography ==
Andrea Mastrillo was born in Palermo, Italy in 1563. On 16 May 1618, he was appointed during the papacy of Pope Paul V as Archbishop of Messina. On 20 May 1618, he was consecrated bishop by Giovanni Garzia Mellini, Cardinal-Priest of Santi Quattro Coronati, with Paolo De Curtis, Bishop Emeritus of Isernia, and Giovanni Battista Lancellotti, Bishop of Nola, serving as co-consecrators. He served as Archbishop of Messina until his death in 1624. While bishop, he was the principal co-consecrator of Fabrizio Antinori, Archbishop of Acerenza e Matera (1622).

== External links and additional sources ==
- Cheney, David M. "Archdiocese of Messina-Lipari-Santa Lucia del Mela". Catholic-Hierarchy.org. (for Chronology of Bishops) ^{[self-published]}
- Chow, Gabriel. "Archdiocese of Messina-Lipari-Santa Lucia del Mela (Italy)". GCatholic.org. (for Chronology of Bishops) ^{[self-published]}

Catholic Church titles
Preceded by Pedro Ruiz Valdivieso	Archbishop of Messina; 1618–1624	Succeeded by Biagio Proto de Rossi
