= Andrea Bonito =

Most Reverend Andrea Bonito
- Bishop of Capaccio
- Church: Catholic Church
- Diocese: Diocese of Capaccio
- In office: 1677–1674
- Predecessor: Camillo Ragona
- Successor: Giovanni Battista De Pace

Orders
- Consecration: 20 June 1677 by Alessandro Crescenzi (cardinal)

Personal details
- Born: 1619 Amalfi, Italy
- Died: 2 February 1684 (age 65) Capaccio, Italy

Andrea Bonito, C.O. (1619 – 2 February 1684) was a Roman Catholic prelate who served as Bishop of Capaccio (1677–1674).

== Biography ==
Andrea Bonito was born in Amalfi, Italy, in 1619 and ordained a priest in the Oratory of Saint Philip Neri. On 14 June 1677, he was appointed during the papacy of Pope Innocent XI as Bishop of Capaccio. On 20 June 1677, he was consecrated bishop by Alessandro Crescenzi (cardinal), Bishop of Recanati e Loreto, with Carlo Vaini, Titular Archbishop of Nicaea, and Prospero Bottini, Titular Archbishop of Myra, serving as co-consecrators. He served as Bishop of Capaccio until his death on 2 February 1684.

== External links and additional sources ==
- Cheney, David M. "Diocese of Vallo della Lucania". Catholic-Hierarchy.org. (for Chronology of Bishops) ^{[self-published]}
- Chow, Gabriel. "Diocese of Vallo della Lucania (Italy)". GCatholic.org. (for Chronology of Bishops) ^{[self-published]}

Catholic Church titles
Preceded by Camillo Ragona	Bishop of Capaccio; 1677–1674	Succeeded by Giovanni Battista De Pace
