= Maximilianus Raguzzi =

Most Reverend Maximilianus Raguzzi
- Bishop of Vulturara e Montecorvino
- Church: Catholic Church
- Diocese: Diocese of Vulturara e Montecorvino
- In office: 1637–1639
- Predecessor: Tommaso Carafa
- Successor: Bartolomeo Gessi

Orders
- Consecration: 6 September 1637 by Tommaso Carafa (co-consecrator)

Personal details
- Born: 1563 Burgi San Sepulchri, Italy
- Died: 1614 (age 51)

Maximilianus Raguzzi (died 1639) was a Roman Catholic prelate who served as Bishop of Vulturara e Montecorvino (1637–1639).

== Biography ==
On 17 August 1637, Maximilianus Raguzzi was appointed during the papacy of Pope Urban VIII as Bishop of Vulturara e Montecorvino. On 6 September 1637, he was consecrated bishop with Tommaso Carafa, Bishop of Vulturara e Montecorvino, serving as co-consecrator. He served as Bishop of Vulturara e Montecorvino until his death in 1639.

While bishop, he was the principal co-consecrator of Celestino Puccitelli, Bishop of Ravello e Scala (1637).

== External links and additional sources ==
- Cheney, David M. "Diocese of Vulturara e Montecorvino". Catholic-Hierarchy.org. (for Chronology of Bishops) ^{[self-published]}
- Chow, Gabriel. "Titular Episcopal See of Vulturara (Italy)". GCatholic.org. (for Chronology of Bishops) ^{[self-published]}

Catholic Church titles
Preceded by Tommaso Carafa	Bishop of Vulturara e Montecorvino; 1637–1639	Succeeded by Bartolomeo Gessi
