= Giovanni Battista Falesi =

Italian Roman Catholic bishop (1587–1648)

Most Reverend Giovanni Battista Falesi
- Bishop of Mottola
- Church: Catholic Church
- Diocese: Diocese of Mottola
- In office: 1638–1648
- Predecessor: Tommaso d'Ancora
- Successor: Tommaso d'Aquino (bishop of Mottola)

Orders
- Consecration: 24 January 1638 by Francesco Maria Brancaccio

Personal details
- Born: 1587 Naples, Italy
- Died: 1648 (aged 60–61) Mottola, Italy

Giovanni Battista Falesi, O.P. (1587–1648) was a Roman Catholic prelate who served as Bishop of Mottola (1638–1648).

== Biography ==
Giovanni Battista Falesi was born in Naples, Italy in 1587 and ordained a priest in the Order of Preachers. On 15 January 1638, he was appointed during the papacy of Pope Urban VIII as Bishop of Mottola. On 24 January 1638, he was consecrated bishop by Francesco Maria Brancaccio, Cardinal-Priest of Santi XII Apostoli, with Alfonso Gonzaga, Titular Archbishop of Rhodus, and Biago Proto de Rubeis, Archbishop of Messina, serving as co-consecrators. He served as Bishop of Mottola until his death in 1648.

== External links and additional sources ==
- Cheney, David M. "Diocese of Mottola (Motula)". Catholic-Hierarchy.org. (for Chronology of Bishops)^{self-published}
- Chow, Gabriel. "Titular Episcopal See of Mottola (Italy)". GCatholic.org. (for Chronology of Bishops)^{self-published}

Catholic Church titles
Preceded by Tommaso d'Ancora	Bishop of Mottola; 1638–1648	Succeeded by Tommaso d'Aquino (bishop of Mottola)
