= Paolo Odescalchi =

16th-century Roman Catholic bishop

Most Reverend Paolo Odescalchi
- Bishop Emeritus of Penne e Atri
- Church: Catholic Church
- Diocese: Diocese of Penne e Atri
- In office: 1568–1572
- Predecessor: Giacomo Guidi
- Successor: Giambattista de Benedictis
- Previous posts: Apostolic Nuncio to Switzerland (1553–1560); Apostolic Nuncio to Naples (1560–1561 and 1566–1569)

Personal details
- Born: Como, Italy
- Died: 1585

Paolo Odescalchi (died February 8, 1585) was a Roman Catholic prelate who served as Bishop of Penne e Atri (1568–1572), Apostolic Nuncio to Naples (1560–1561 and 1566–1569), and Apostolic Nuncio to Switzerland (1553–1560).

== Biography ==
Paolo Odescalchi was born in Como, Italy. In 1553, he was appointed during the papacy of Pope Julius III as Apostolic Nuncio to Switzerland. On 15 Jun 1560, he was appointed during the papacy of Pope Pius IV as Apostolic Nuncio to Naples; he resigned from the position on 4 Sep 1561. In Dec 1566, he was once again appointed during the papacy of Pope Pius V as Apostolic Nuncio to Naples. On 27 Feb 1568, he was appointed during the papacy of Pope Pius V as Bishop of Penne e Atri and resigned as Apostolic Nuncio to Naples in February 1569. He served as Bishop of Penne e Atri until his resignation in 1572. He died in 1585.

== Episcopal succession ==
While bishop, he was the principal consecrator of:

- Giambattista de Benedictis, Bishop of Penne e Atri (1572);

and the principal co-consecrator of:

- Nicolaus Don, (1571) Titular Bishop of Rosmen and Auxiliary Bishop of Zagreb;
- Pietro Orsini, Titular Bishop of Hippos and Coadjutor Bishop of Spoleto (1580);
- Gaspare Visconti, Bishop of Novara (1584);
- Francesco Liparuli, Bishop of Capri (1584); and
- Cesare Speciano, Bishop of Novara (1584).

== External links and additional sources ==
- Cheney, David M. "Nunciature to Switzerland". Catholic-Hierarchy.org. (for Chronology of Bishops) ^{[self-published]}
- Chow, Gabriel. "Apostolic Nunciature Switzerland". GCatholic.org. Archived from the original on October 21, 2015. (for Chronology of Bishops) ^{[self-published]}
- Cheney, David M. "Nunciature to Naples". Catholic-Hierarchy.org. (for Chronology of Bishops) ^{[self-published]}
- Cheney, David M. "Archdiocese of Pescara-Penne". Catholic-Hierarchy.org. (for Chronology of Bishops) ^{[self-published]}
- Chow, Gabriel. "Metropolitan Archdiocese of Pescara-Penne (Italy)". GCatholic.org. (for Chronology of Bishops) ^{[self-published]}

Catholic Church titles
Preceded by	Apostolic Nuncio to Switzerland; 1553–1560	Succeeded by Ottaviano della Raverta
Preceded by Giulio Pavesi	Apostolic Nuncio to Naples (1st term); 1560–1561	Succeeded by Niccolò Fieschi (bishop)
Preceded by Cipriano Pallavicino	Apostolic Nuncio to Naples (2nd term); 1566–1569	Succeeded by Antonmaria Sauli
Preceded by Giacomo Guidi	Bishop of Penne e Atri; 1568–1572	Succeeded by Giambattista de Benedictis
