= Fabio Arcella =

16th-century Roman Catholic bishop

Most Reverend Fabio Arcella
- Archbishop of Capua
- Church: Catholic Church
- Archdiocese: Archdiocese of Capua
- In office: 1549–1560
- Predecessor: Niccolò Caetani di Sermoneta
- Successor: Niccolò Caetani di Sermoneta

Personal details
- Born: Naples, Italy
- Died: 1560

Fabio Arcella (died 1560) was a Roman Catholic prelate who served as Archbishop of Capua (1549–1560), Bishop of Policastro (1537–1542), Bishop of Bisignano (1530–1535), and Apostolic Nuncio to Naples (1529–1530 and 1535–1537).

== Biography ==
Fabio Arcella was born in Naples, Italy towards the end of the 15th century. In 1528, he was appointed during the papacy of Pope Clement VII as Apostolic Nuncio to Naples. On 24 Jan 1530, he was appointed during the papacy of Pope Clement VII as Bishop of Bisignano. In 1535, he was recalled to Rome and again named Apostolic Nuncio to Naples. On 5 Mar 1537, he was appointed during the papacy of Pope Paul III as Bishop of Policastro. He resigned in 1542 and returned to Naples where he again represented the Vatican although without the formal designation as Nuncio. On 18 Jan 1549, he was appointed during the papacy of Pope Paul III as Archbishop of Capua. He served as Archbishop of Capua until his death in 1560.

== External links and additional sources ==
- Cheney, David M. "Diocese of Bisignano". Catholic-Hierarchy.org. (for Chronology of Bishops) ^{[self-published]}
- Chow, Gabriel. "Diocese of Bisignano (Italy)". GCatholic.org. (for Chronology of Bishops) ^{[self-published]}
- Cheney, David M. "Diocese of Policastro". Catholic-Hierarchy.org. (for Chronology of Bishops) ^{[self-published]}
- Chow, Gabriel. "Diocese of Policastro (Italy)". GCatholic.org. (for Chronology of Bishops) ^{[self-published]}
- Cheney, David M. "Archdiocese of Capua". Catholic-Hierarchy.org. (for Chronology of Bishops) ^{[self-published]}
- Chow, Gabriel. "Archdiocese of Capua (Italy)". GCatholic.org. (for Chronology of Bishops) ^{[self-published]}

Catholic Church titles
Preceded by	Apostolic Nuncio to Naples; 1529–1530	Succeeded by
Preceded by Francesco Piccolomini	Bishop of Bisignano; 1530–1535	Succeeded by Niccolò Caetani di Sermoneta
Preceded by Tommaso Caracciolo	Apostolic Nuncio to Naples (2nd time); 1535–1537	Succeeded by
Preceded by Andrea Matteo Palmieri	Bishop of Policastro; 1537–1542	Succeeded by Uberto Gambara
Preceded by Niccolò Caetani di Sermoneta	Archbishop of Capua; 1549–1560	Succeeded by Niccolò Caetani di Sermoneta
