= Ludovico Prodocator =

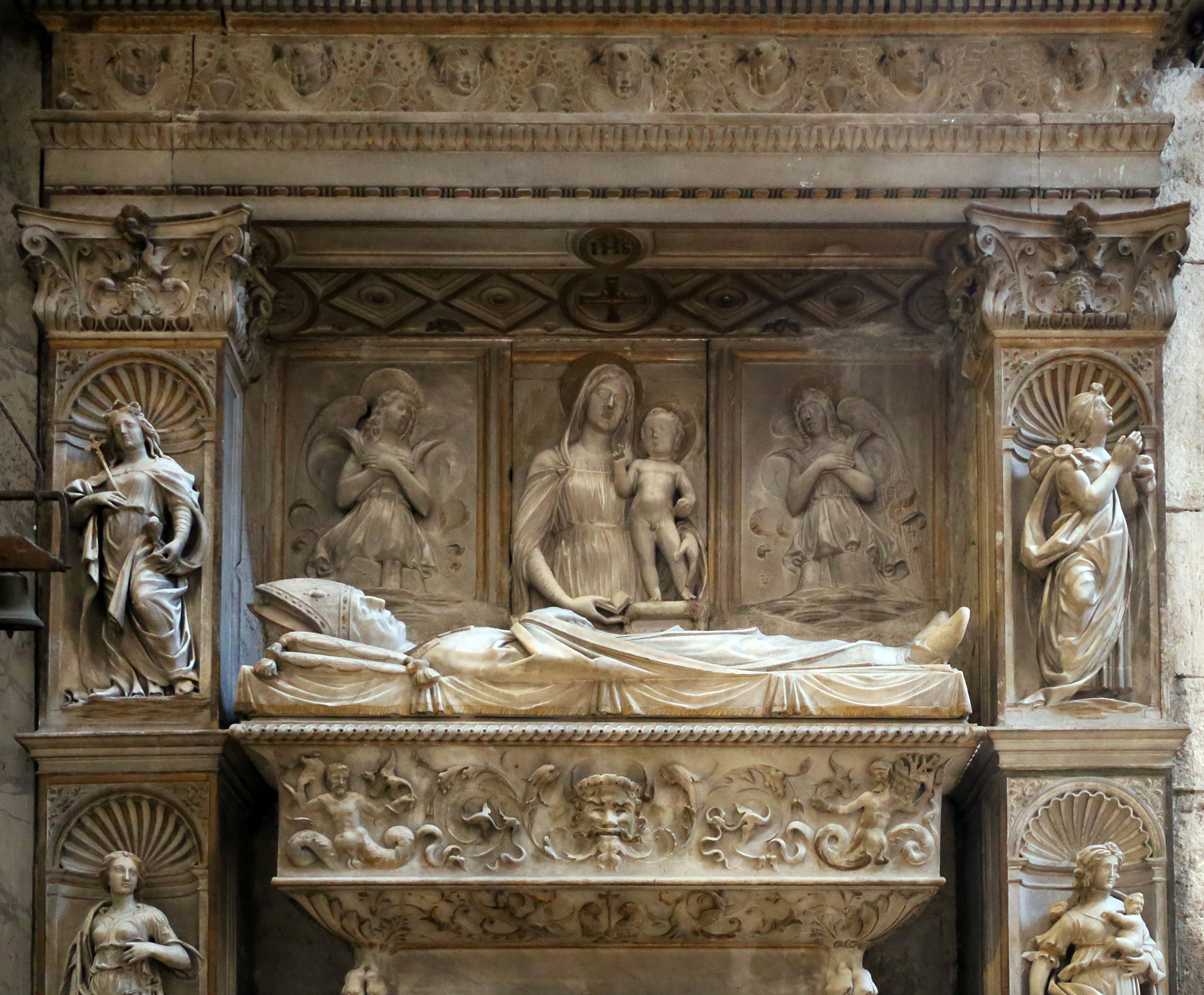
Prodocator's monumental tomb, attributed to Giovanni Cristoforo Romano

Ludovico Prodocator (Greek: Λουδοβίκος Ποδοκάθαρος, romanized: Ludovikos Podokatharos; also Podochatero, Podocatharo, Podocatharus, Podacatharus, Podocathro; 1430/31 – 24 August 1504) was a Greek Cypriot cardinal of the Catholic Church. He was bishop of Capaccio.

Between 1430 and 1431 in Nicosia, in the Kingdom of Cyprus, to a member of an illustrious family of Greek origin closely linked to the Lusignan dynasty. He was private secretary and possibly physician to Rodrigo Borgia, later Alexander VI, and also to Innocent VIII. He rose through the church hierarchy and was made cardinal on 19 February 1500 by Pope Alexander VI. In September 1503, he was considered likely to be elected to the papacy. However, Francesco Todeschini Piccolomini was elected as Pius III. He is buried in the Basilica of Santa Maria del Popolo.

== External links and additional sources ==
- Cheney, David M. "Diocese of Vallo della Lucania". Catholic-Hierarchy.org. (for Chronology of Bishops) ^{[self-published]}
- Chow, Gabriel. "Diocese of Vallo della Lucania (Italy)". GCatholic.org. (for Chronology of Bishops) ^{[self-published]}
- Cheney, David M. "Archdiocese of Benevento". Catholic-Hierarchy.org. (for Chronology of Bishops) ^{[self-published]}
- Chow, Gabriel. "Archdiocese of Benevento (Italy)". GCatholic.org. (for Chronology of Bishops) ^{[self-published]}

Catholic Church titles
Preceded by Ausias Despuig	Bishop of Capaccio; 1483–1503	Succeeded by Luigi d'Aragona
Preceded by Bartolomé Martí	Cardinal-Priest of Sant'Agata de' Goti; 1500–1504	Succeeded by Gabriele de' Gabrielli
Preceded by Lorenzo Cibo de' Mari	Archbishop of Benevento; 1503–1504	Succeeded by Galeotto Franciotti della Rovere
