= Niccolò Caetani =

Italian Roman Catholic cardinal and bishop

His Eminence Niccolò Caetani di Sermoneta
- Cardinal-Deacon of Sant'Eustachio
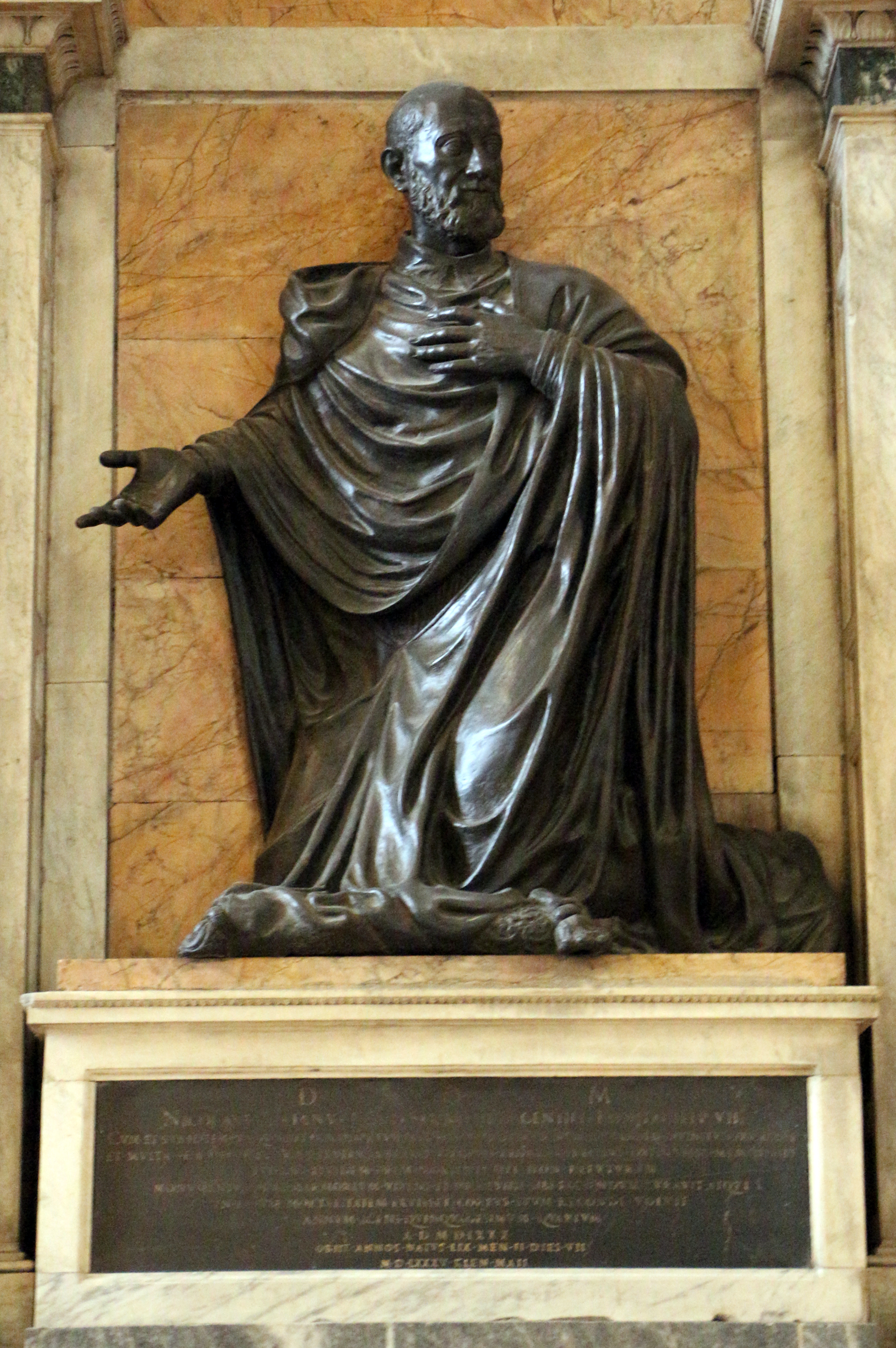
- Tomb in Loreto
- Church: Catholic Church
- In office: 1552–1585

Orders
- Consecration: 2 January 1564 by Charles Borromeo
- Created cardinal: 22 December 1536 by Pope Paul III
- Rank: Cardinal-deacon

Personal details
- Born: 23 February 1526 Rome, Papal States
- Died: 1 May 1585 (aged 59) Rome, Papal States

Niccolò Caetani di Sermoneta (1526–1585) was an Italian Roman Catholic cardinal and bishop.

== Biography ==
Niccolò Caetani was born in Rome on 23 February 1526, the son of Camillo Caetani, 3rd duke of Sermoneta, a cousin of Pope Paul III, and his second wife, Flaminia Savelli. His families were patricians from Naples. He was the uncle of Cardinal Enrico Caetani.

At the age of 10, Pope Paul III made him a cardinal deacon in pectore in the consistory of 22 December 1536. On 5 March 1537, he became administrator of the Diocese of Bisignano. His elevation to the cardinalate was published in the consistory of 13 March 1538; he received the red hat and the deaconry of San Nicola in Carcere on 16 April 1538.

On 8 August 1539, he was elected Bishop of Conza. He was promoted to the metropolitan see of Capua on 5 May 1546. He resigned the administration of Bisignano on 13 March 1549.

He participated in the papal conclave of 1549-50 that elected Pope Julius III.

He became administrator of the see of Quimper on 14 July 1550. On 9 March 1552, he opted for the deaconry of Sant'Eustachio.

He participated in both the papal conclave of April 1555 that elected Pope Marcellus II and the papal conclave of May 1555 that elected Pope Paul IV. He later participated in the papal conclave of 1559 that elected Pope Pius IV.

On 7 January 1560, he was named governor of Cesi, Terni. He resigned the administration of Quimper on 5 April 1560. He participated in the papal conclave of 1565-66 that elected Pope Pius V. In 1570, he became cardinal protector of the Kingdom of Scotland. He participated in the papal conclave of 1572 that elected Pope Gregory XIII.

From 6 January 1577 to 8 January 1578, he was the Camerlengo of the Sacred College of Cardinals.

He participated in the papal conclave of 1585 that elected Pope Sixtus V. He died on the day of the papal coronation, 1 May 1585. His body was transferred to Loreto and he is buried there in the Basilica della Santa Casa.

== Episcopal succession ==
While bishop, he was the principal consecrator of:

- Giulio della Rovere, Archbishop of Ravenna (1566);
- Giovanni Francesco Gàmbara, Bishop of Viterbo e Tuscania (1566);
- Iñigo Avalos de Aragón, Bishop of Mileto (1566); and
- Guglielmo Sirleto, Bishop of San Marco (1566).

== See also ==
- Catholic Church in Italy

Catholic Church titles
Preceded by Fabio Arcella	Administrator of Bisignano; 1537–1549	Succeeded by Domenico Somma
Preceded by Rodrigo Luis de Borja y de Castre-Pinós	Cardinal-Deacon of San Nicola in Carcere; 1538–1552	Succeeded by Giacomo Savelli
Preceded by Troiano Gesualdo	Archbishop of Conza; 1539–1546	Succeeded by Marcello Crescenzi
Preceded by Tommaso Caracciolo	Archbishop of Capua (1st appointment); 1546–1549	Succeeded by Fabio Arcella
Preceded by Philippe de La Chambre	Administrator of Quimper; 1550–1560	Succeeded by Etienne Bouchier
Preceded by Guido Ascanio Sforza di Santa Fiora	Cardinal-Deacon of Sant'Eustachio; 1552–1585	Succeeded by Ferdinando de' Medici
Preceded by Fabio Arcella	Archbishop of Capua (2nd appointment); 1564–1585	Succeeded by Cesare Costa
