= Diocese of Bisignano =

The former Italian Catholic diocese of Bisignano, in Calabria, existed from the eighth century until 1818. In that year it was united with the diocese of San Marco, to create the diocese of San Marco e Bisignano. More recently, Bisignano passed to the archdiocese of Cosenza-Bisignano.

== History ==
Bisignano is the ancient Besidias, or Besidianum, which in the eleventh century became the residence of a Norman count and later a fief of the Orsini. In 1467 Skanderbeg's daughter, wife of the Prince of Bisignano, invited there many Albanian families who established various colonies, spoke their own language, and used the Greek Rite.

The first mention of a bishop is in 1179. Bisignano certainly had bishops in the tenth century, when mention is made of Ulutto in the life of St. Uilo di Rossano; Bishop Federico (1331) was killed in 1339.

== Bishops of Bisignano ==
Erected: 7th Century
Latin Name: Bisinianensis

...

- Nicola Piscicelli (11 Sep 1445 – 21 Apr 1449 Appointed, Archbishop of Salerno)
- Giovanni Frangipane (bishop) (14 May 1449 – 1486 Died)
- Bernardino Ferrari de Achrio (22 Sep 1486 – 1498 Died)
- Francesco Piccolomini (3 Dec 1498 – 1530 Died)
- Fabio Arcella (24 Jan 1530 – 5 Mar 1537 Appointed, Bishop of Policastro)
- Niccolò Caetani di Sermoneta (5 Mar 1537 – 13 Mar 1549 Resigned)
- Domenico Somma (13 Mar 1549 – 24 Dec 1558 Died)
- Sante Sacco (7 Feb 1560 – 1563 Died)
- Luigi Cavalcanti (30 Jan 1563 – 1564 Died)
- Martino Terracina (28 Jul 1564 – 1566 Died)
- Filippo Spinola (8 Feb 1566 – 9 Mar 1569 Appointed, Bishop of Nola)
- Prospero Vitelliano (22 Apr 1569 – 1575 Resigned)
- Giovanni Andrea Signati (23 Sep 1575 – Nov 1575 Died)
- Pompeo Belli (2 Dec 1575 – 1584 Died)
- Domenico Petrucci (23 Jul 1584 – 1598 Died)
- Bernardo del Nero, OP (25 May 1598 – 1607 Resigned)
- Gian Giacomo Amati (2 Apr 1607 – 1611 Died)
- Mario Orsini (31 Jan 1611 – 15 Apr 1624 Appointed, Bishop of Tivoli)
- Alderano Bellati (Bellatto) (15 Apr 1624 – 1626 Resigned)
- Giovanni Battista de Paola (27 May 1626 – 1657 Died)
- Carlo Filippo Mei, B. (8 Jul 1658 – 27 Apr 1664 Died)
- Paolo Piromalli, OP (15 Dec 1664 – 12 Jul 1667 Died)
- Giuseppe Maria Sebastiani, OCD (22 Aug 1667 – 3 Oct 1672 Appointed, Bishop of Città di Castello)
- Onofrio Manesi (3 Oct 1672 – 22 Nov 1679 Died)
- Giuseppe Consoli (7 Oct 1680 – Mar 1706 Died)
- Pompilio Berlingieri (17 May 1706 – Mar 1721 Died)
- Orazio Capalbi (Dec 1713 – 1721 Died)
- Felix Solazzo Castriotta (16 Jul 1721 – 18 Jun 1745 Resigned)
- Bonaventura Sculco (21 Jun 1745 – 20 Sep 1781 Died)
- Lorenzo Maria (Pietro Felice) Varano, OP (18 Jun 1792 Confirmed – 9 Dec 1803 Died)

27 June 1818 United with the Diocese of San Marco (Argentano) to form the Diocese of San Marco e Bisignano

== Sources ==
- D’Alessandro, R. (1998). Chiesa e Socie tà in Calabria. I Sinodi di Bisignano (1630 – 1727). (in Italian). Cosenza: Satem 1998.

Attribution
