= Gabriele de' Gabrielli =

16th-century Catholic cardinal

His Eminence Gabriele de' Gabrielli
- Cardinal-Priest of Santa Prassede
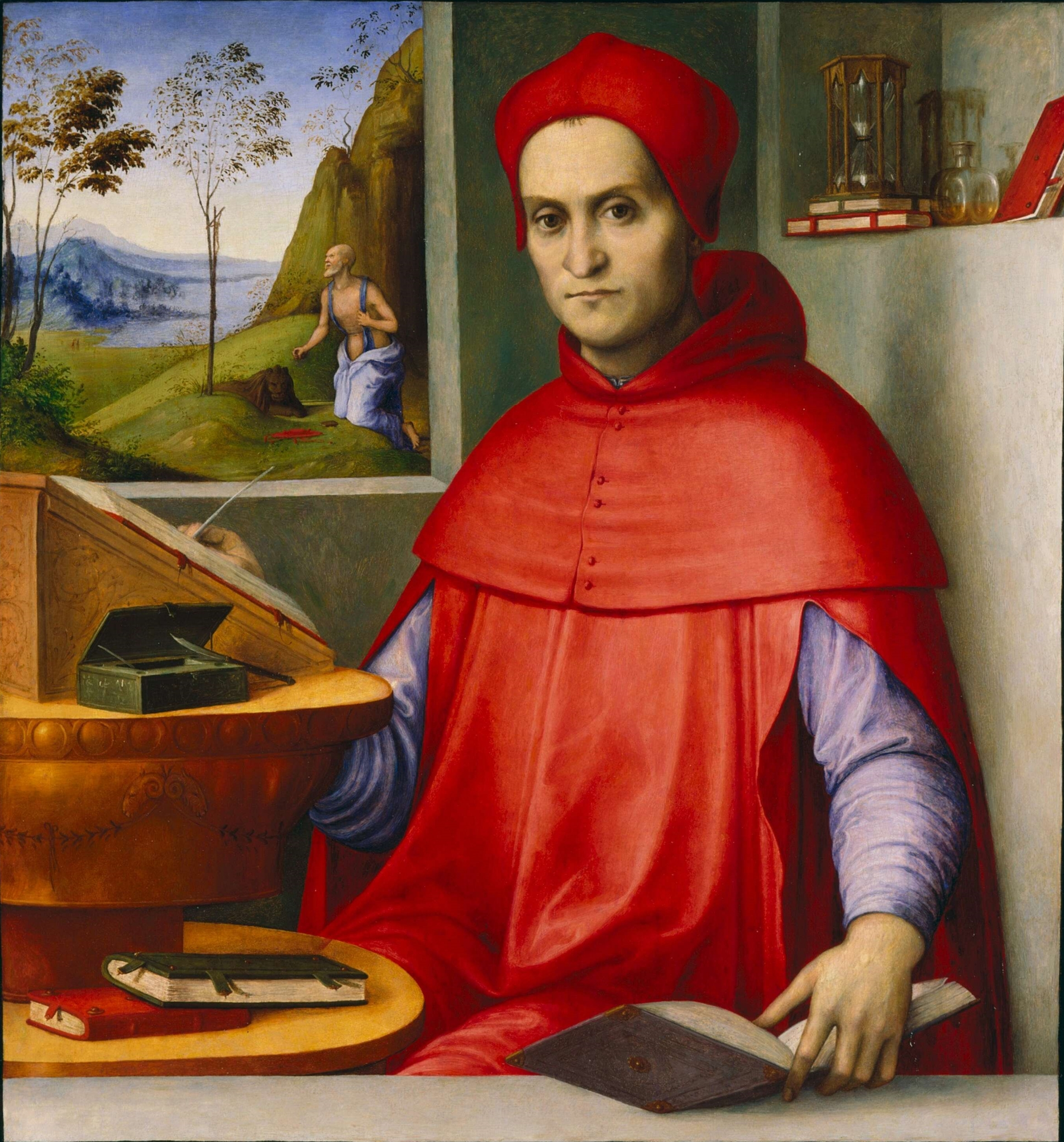
- Gabriele de' Gabrielli in a portrait by Lorenzo Costa (Minneapolis Institute of Art)
- Church: Catholic Church

Orders
- Consecration: 9 Apr 1504 by Giuliano della Rovere

Personal details
- Born: 1445 Fano, Italy
- Died: 5 Nov 1511 (age 66) Rome, Italy

Gabriele de' Gabrielli (1445–1511) (called the Cardinal of Urbino) was an Italian Roman Catholic bishop and cardinal.

== Biography ==
Gabriele de' Gabrielli was a member of the Gabrielli family. He was born in Fano in 1445.

During the pontificate of Pope Alexander VI, he became a protonotary apostolic in Rome. He then entered the service of Cardinal Giuliano della Rovere, the future Pope Julius II, travelling with Cardinal della Rovere to the Kingdom of France when the cardinal went into voluntary exile during the dispute between Pope Alexander VI and the della Rovere family.

On March 27, 1504, he was elected Bishop of Urbino. He was consecrated as a bishop in the Vatican by Pope Julius II on April 9, 1504 with Antonio Pallavicini Gentili, Cardinal-Bishop of Palestrina, and Giovanni Antonio Sangiorgio, Cardinal-Bishop of Frascati, serving as co-consecrators. He was enthroned in 1505 and occupied that see until his death.

Pope Julius II made him a cardinal deacon in the consistory of December 1, 1505. He received the red hat and the deaconry of Sant'Agata dei Goti on December 17, 1505. On September 11, 1507, he opted for the order of cardinal priests and received the titular church of Santa Prassede.

The pope named him papal legate in Perugia, but he soon had to resign because of poor health. He served as papal legate at the meeting in Savona between Louis XII of France and Ferdinand II of Aragon.

He died in the Apostolic Palace in Rome on November 5, 1511. He is buried in Santa Prassede.

Catholic Church titles
Preceded by Giampietro Arrivabene	Bishop of Urbino; 1504–1511	Succeeded by Antonio Trombetta
Preceded by Ludovico Podocathor	Cardinal-Deacon of Sant'Agata de' Goti; 1505–1507	Succeeded by Ercole Rangone
Preceded by Antonio Pallavicini Gentili	Cardinal-Priest of Santa Prassede; 1507–1511	Succeeded by Christopher Bainbridge
