= Tommaso Carafa =

Roman Catholic prelate

Most Reverend Tommaso Carafa
- Bishop of Capaccio
- Church: Catholic Church
- Diocese: Roman Catholic Diocese of Capaccio
- In office: 1639–1664
- Predecessor: Luigi Pappacoda
- Successor: Camillo Ragona
- Previous post: Bishop of Vulturara e Montecorvino (1623–1637)

Orders
- Consecration: 26 November 1623 by Cosimo de Torres

Personal details
- Born: 1588
- Died: 7 December 1664 (age 76) Capaccio, Italy

Tommaso Carafa (1588 – 7 December 1664) was a Roman Catholic prelate who served as Bishop of Capaccio (1639–1664) and Bishop of Vulturara e Montecorvino (1623–1637).

== Biography ==
Tommaso Carafa was born in 1588. On 20 November 1623, he was appointed during the papacy of Pope Urban VIII as Bishop of Vulturara e Montecorvino. On 26 November 1623, he was consecrated bishop by Cosimo de Torres, Cardinal-Priest of San Pancrazio, with Paolo Emilio Santori, Archbishop of Urbino, and Giuseppe Acquaviva, Titular Archbishop of Thebae, serving as co-consecrators. He served as Bishop of Vulturara e Montecorvino until his resignation in 1637. On 11 July 1639, he was appointed during the papacy of Pope Urban VIII as Bishop of Capaccio. He served as Bishop of Capaccio until his death on 7 December 1664.

== Episcopal succession ==
While bishop, he was the principal co-consecrator of:

- Alessandro Sibilia, Bishop of Capri (1637);
- Maximilianus Raguzzi, Bishop of Vulturara e Montecorvino (1637);
- Carlo Maranta, Bishop of Giovinazzo (1637);
- Domenico Giordani, Bishop of Isernia (1637);
- Bruno Sciamanna, Bishop of Lucera (1637);
- Giovanni Spennazzi, Bishop of Pienza (1637);
- Jean Duval, Bishop of Baghdad (1638);
- Simone Carafa Roccella, Archbishop of Acerenza e Matera (1638);
- Juan Pastor, Bishop of Crotone (1638);
- Francesco Boccapaduli, Bishop of Valva e Sulmona (1638);
- Pietro Paolo Bonsi, Bishop of Acerno (1638);
- Angelo Pichi, Archbishop of Amalfi (1638);
- Stefano Sauli, Archbishop of Chieti (1638);
- Diego Sersale, Archbishop of Bari (1638);
- Enea di Cesare Spennazzi, Bishop of Sovana (1638);
- Girolamo Figini-Oddi, Bishop of Teramo (1639);
- Patrizio Donati, Bishop of Minori (1639);
- Bartolomeo Cresconi, Bishop of Umbriatico (1639);
- Pietro Paolo Medici, Bishop of Alife (1639);
- Girolamo Farnese, Titular Archbishop of Patrae (1639);
- Giovanni Tommaso Perrone, Bishop of Nicastro (1639);
- Ippolito Andreassi, Bishop of Terni (1639);
- Francesco d'Elia e Rossi, Bishop of Siracusa (1639);
- Orazio Monaldi, Bishop of Gubbio (1639);
- Camillo Ragona, Bishop of Acerno (1644); and
- Giulio Spinola, Titular Archbishop of Laodicea in Phrygia (1658).

== See also ==
- Catholic Church in Italy

== External links and additional sources ==
- Cheney, David M. "Diocese of Vallo della Lucania". Catholic-Hierarchy.org. (for Chronology of Bishops) ^{[self-published]}
- Chow, Gabriel. "Diocese of Vallo della Lucania (Italy)". GCatholic.org. (for Chronology of Bishops) ^{[self-published]}
- Cheney, David M. "Diocese of Vulturara e Montecorvino". Catholic-Hierarchy.org. (for Chronology of Bishops) ^{[self-published]}
- Chow, Gabriel. "Titular Episcopal See of Vulturara (Italy)". GCatholic.org. (for Chronology of Bishops) ^{[self-published]}

Catholic Church titles
Preceded by Franciscus Buratti	Bishop of Vulturara e Montecorvino; 1623–1637	Succeeded by Maximilianus Raguzzi
Preceded by Luigi Pappacoda	Bishop of Capaccio; 1639–1664	Succeeded by Camillo Ragona
