= Tommaso d'Aquino (bishop of Mottola) =

Italian Roman Catholic bishop (1584–1651)

Most Reverend Tommaso d'Aquino
- Church: Catholic Church
- Diocese: Diocese of Mottola
- In office: 1648–1651
- Predecessor: Giovanni Battista Falesi
- Successor: Giovanni Camponeschi

Personal details
- Born: 1584 Naples, Italy
- Died: 1651 (age 67) Mottola, Italy

Tommaso d'Aquino, C.R. (1584–1651) was a Roman Catholic prelate who served as Bishop of Mottola (1648–1651).

== Biography ==
Tommaso d'Aquino was born in Naples and ordained a priest in the Congregation of Clerics Regular of the Divine Providence. On 8 February 1648, he was selected as Bishop of Mottola and confirmed by Pope Innocent X on 24 August 1648. On 20 September 1648, he was consecrated bishop by Pier Luigi Carafa, Cardinal-Priest of Santi Silvestro e Martino ai Monti, with Fausto Caffarelli, Archbishop of Santa Severina, and Ranuccio Scotti Douglas, Bishop of Borgo San Donnino, serving as co-consecrators. He served as Bishop of Mottola until his death in 1650.

== External links and additional sources ==
- Cheney, David M. "Diocese of Mottola (Motula)". Catholic-Hierarchy.org. (for Chronology of Bishops)^{self-published}
- Chow, Gabriel. "Titular Episcopal See of Mottola (Italy)". GCatholic.org. (for Chronology of Bishops)^{self-published}

Catholic Church titles
Preceded by Giovanni Battista Falesi	Bishop of Mottola; 1648–1651	Succeeded by Giovanni Camponeschi
