= Alfredo Ragona =

Greek footballer (born 1922)

Personal information
- Date of birth: 26 December 1922
- Place of birth: Corfu, Greece
- Position: Forward

Senior career*
Years	Team	Apps	(Gls)
1946–1947	Bari	4	(0)
1947–1949	Cosenza	62	(19)
1949–1950	Napoli	6	(0)
1950–1952	Brindisi	?	(?)
- * Club domestic league appearances and goals

Alfredo Ragona (Greek: Αλφρέντο Ραγκόνα; born 26 December 1922) was the first Greek football player to compete in Italy's first division.

== Career ==
Born in Corfu, Ragona was the first person born in Greece to play in Italy's Serie A. Ragona signed with Serie A side Bari in 1946, and spent one seasons with the club before moving to Serie B sides Cosenza and Napoli.
