= Tommaso Caracciolo (archbishop of Capua) =

Italian Catholic bishop (1478–1546)

Most Reverend Tommaso Caracciolo
- Archbishop of Capua
- Church: Catholic Church
- Archdiocese: Archdiocese of Capua
- In office: 1536–1546
- Predecessor: Nikolaus von Schönberg
- Successor: Niccolò Caetani di Sermoneta
- Previous posts: Bishop of Capaccio (1523–1531); Apostolic Nuncio to Naples (1534–1535); Bishop of Trivento (1502–1540)

Personal details
- Born: 1478
- Died: 31 March 1546 (age 68) Capua, Italy

Tommaso Caracciolo (1478–1546) was a Roman Catholic prelate who served as Archbishop of Capua (1536–1546), Bishop of Trivento (1502–1540), Apostolic Nuncio to Naples (1534–1535), and Bishop of Capaccio (1523–1531).

== Biography ==
Tommaso Caracciolo was born in 1478. On 6 March 1502, he was appointed during the papacy of Pope Alexander VI as Bishop of Trivento. On 12 June 1523, he was appointed during the papacy of Pope Adrian VI as Bishop of Capaccio. In 1531, he resigned as Bishop of Capaccio. In 1534, he was appointed during the papacy of Pope Clement VII as Apostolic Nuncio to Naples; he resigned from the position in 1535. On 28 April 1536, he was appointed during the papacy of Pope Clement VII as Archbishop of Capua. In 1540, he resigned as Bishop of Trivento. He served as Archbishop of Capua until his death on 31 March 1546.

== See also ==
- Catholic Church in Italy

== External links and additional sources ==
- Cheney, David M. "Diocese of Vallo della Lucania". Catholic-Hierarchy.org. (for Chronology of Bishops) ^{[self-published]}
- Chow, Gabriel. "Diocese of Vallo della Lucania (Italy)". GCatholic.org. (for Chronology of Bishops) ^{[self-published]}
- Cheney, David M. "Nunciature to Naples". Catholic-Hierarchy.org. (for Chronology of Bishops) ^{[self-published]}
- Cheney, David M. "Diocese of Trivento". Catholic-Hierarchy.org. (for Chronology of Bishops) ^{[self-published]}
- Chow, Gabriel. "Diocese of Trivento (Italy)". GCatholic.org. (for Chronology of Bishops) ^{[self-published]}
- Cheney, David M. "Archdiocese of Capua". Catholic-Hierarchy.org. (for Chronology of Bishops) ^{[self-published]}
- Chow, Gabriel. "Archdiocese of Capua (Italy)". GCatholic.org. (for Chronology of Bishops) ^{[self-published]}

Catholic Church titles
Preceded by Lorenzo Pucci	Bishop of Capaccio; 1523–1531	Succeeded by Enrico Loffredo
Preceded by	Apostolic Nuncio to Naples; 1534–1535	Succeeded by Fabio Arcella
Preceded by Leonardo Carmini	Bishop of Trivento; 1502–1540	Succeeded by Matteo Griffoni Pioppi
Preceded by Nikolaus von Schönberg	Archbishop of Capua; 1536–1546	Succeeded by Niccolò Caetani di Sermoneta
