= Camillo Ragona =

Italian Roman Catholic prelate

Most Reverend Camillo Ragona
- Bishop of Capaccio
- Church: Catholic Church
- Diocese: Diocese of Capaccio
- In office: 1665–1677
- Predecessor: Tommaso Carafa
- Successor: Andrea Bonito
- Previous post: Bishop of Acerno (1644–1665)

Orders
- Consecration: 23 October 1644 by Francesco Maria Brancaccio

Personal details
- Born: 1604 Tricarico, Italy
- Died: 1 August 1677 (age 73) Capaccio, Italy

Camillo Ragona (1604 – 1 August 1677) was a Roman Catholic prelate who served as Bishop of Capaccio (1665–1677) and Bishop of Acerno (1644–1665).

== Biography ==
Camillo Ragona was born in Tricarico, Italy, in 1604. On 17 October 1644, he was appointed during the papacy of Pope Innocent X as Bishop of Acerno. On 23 October 1644, he was consecrated bishop by Francesco Maria Brancaccio, Cardinal-Priest of Santi XII Apostoli, with Tommaso Carafa, Bishop of Capaccio, and Luigi Pappacoda, Bishop of Lecce, serving as co-consecrators. On 13 April 1665, he was appointed during the papacy of Pope Alexander VII as Bishop of Capaccio. He served as Bishop of Capaccio until his death on 1 August 1677.

== External links and additional sources ==
- Cheney, David M. "Diocese of Acerno". Catholic-Hierarchy.org. (for Chronology of Bishops) ^{[self-published]}
- Chow, Gabriel. "Diocese of Acerno". GCatholic.org. (for Chronology of Bishops) ^{[self-published]}
- Cheney, David M. "Diocese of Vallo della Lucania". Catholic-Hierarchy.org. (for Chronology of Bishops) ^{[self-published]}
- Chow, Gabriel. "Diocese of Vallo della Lucania (Italy)". GCatholic.org. (for Chronology of Bishops) ^{[self-published]}

Catholic Church titles
| Preceded by Clemente Confetti | Bishop of Acerno; 1644–1665 | Succeeded by Antoine Glielmi |
| Preceded by Tommaso Carafa | Bishop of Capaccio; 1665–1677 | Succeeded by Andrea Bonito |
