= Enrico Loffredo =

Italian Roman Catholic bishop (1507–1547)

Most Reverend Enrico Loffredo
- Bishop of Capaccio
- Church: Catholic Church
- Diocese: Diocese of Capaccio
- In office: 1531–1547
- Predecessor: Tommaso Caracciolo
- Successor: Francesco Sfondrati

Personal details
- Born: 1507
- Died: January 1547 (age 40) Capaccio, Italy

Enrico Loffredo (1507–1547) was a Roman Catholic prelate who served as Bishop of Capaccio (1531–1547).

== Biography ==
Enrico Loffredo was born in 1507. On 18 December 1531, he was appointed during the papacy of Pope Clement VII as Bishop of Capaccio. He served as Bishop of Capaccio until his death in January 1547.

While bishop, he was the principal co-consecrator of Giovanni Maria Canigiani, Auxiliary Bishop of Pistoia and Titular Bishop of Hippos (1540); and Jan Wilamowski, Bishop of Kamyanets-Podilskyi (1540).

== External links and additional sources ==
- Cheney, David M. "Diocese of Vallo della Lucania". Catholic-Hierarchy.org. (for Chronology of Bishops) ^{[self-published]}
- Chow, Gabriel. "Diocese of Vallo della Lucania (Italy)". GCatholic.org. (for Chronology of Bishops) ^{[self-published]}

Catholic Church titles
Preceded by Tommaso Caracciolo	Bishop of Capaccio; 1531–1547	Succeeded by Francesco Sfondrati
