= Gaspare Bertoni =

Italian Roman Catholic saint

Saint Gaspare Bertoni CSS
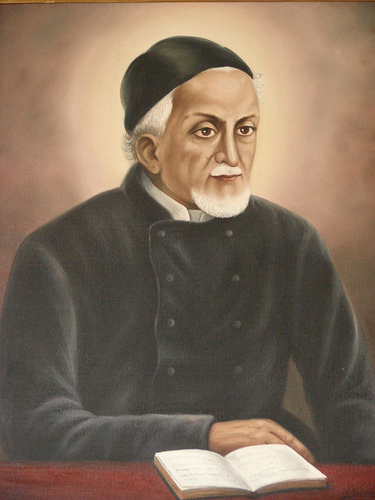

Priest
- Born: 9 October 1777; Verona, Republic of Venice
- Died: 12 June 1853 (aged 75); Verona, Kingdom of Lombardy–Venetia
- Venerated in: Roman Catholic Church
- Beatified: 1 November 1975, Saint Peter's Square, Vatican City by Pope Paul VI
- Canonized: 1 November 1989, Saint Peter's Square, Vatican City by Pope John Paul II
- Feast: 12 June
- Attributes: Priest's cassock
- Patronage: Stigmatines

Gaspare Luigi Bertoni, CSS (9 October 1777 – 12 June 1853) was an Italian Catholic priest and the founder of the Congregation of the Sacred Stigmata, also known as the Stigmatines.

== Life ==
Gaspar Bertoni was born in Verona on 9 October 1777 to Francesco Bertoni (whose profession was the law) and Brunora Ravelli. His sister died when he was still a child.

Bertoni received his initial education from his parents. Bertoni later studied under the Jesuits and the Marian Congregation at Saint Sebastian's School in his hometown of Verona.

He commenced his studies for the priesthood in 1796. On 1 June 1796 - around the time of the French Revolution - troops from France began a two-decade occupation of the northern Italian cities. Bertoni joined the Gospel Fraternity for Hospitals and worked to help those wounded and ill while also focusing on those who were displaced or otherwise harmed due to the effects of the occupation. He was ordained as a priest on 20 September 1800.

Bertoni served as the chaplain to the Daughters of Charity, founded by Magdalene of Canossa, while also serving as the spiritual director of the seminary. He was also one of the leaders to offer prayers and support for Pope Pius VII when he was imprisoned by Napoleon Bonaparte. His pastoral work was marked by the establishment of the Marian Oratories and the devotion to the Five Wounds of Christ and the establishment of schools for the poor. He founded the Congregation of the Sacred Stigmata of Our Lord Jesus Christ (the Stigmatines) on 4 November 1816. As of 2012, there were reported to be 94 houses with 422 members, including 331 priests.

Bertoni was a rather frail and average-looking man, beset with fevers and a continuing infection in his right leg during the last two decades of his life. Over 300 operations were performed on his leg in an effort to stem the infection. However, he continued to serve as counsellor and spiritual director from his hospital bed until his death in 1853. Gaspare Luigi Bertoni was buried in the Veronese church of the Stimmate.

== Veneration ==
=== Venerable ===
The sainthood process commenced in Verona with an informative process and the collation of his writings. Theologians approved them as being in line with the magisterium in a decree of 9 August 1915. The introduction of the cause came on 2 March 1906 under Pope Pius X, granting him the title of Servant of God. The apostolic process was held not long after this. Both processes were validated on 18 December 1929 in Rome at the discretion of the Congregation of Rites.

On 15 December 1966, he was proclaimed to be Venerable after Pope Paul VI acknowledged his life of heroic virtue.

=== Beatification ===
The process for the miracle needed for his beatification commenced in 1946 and concluded in 1950, after which the process was validated in Rome on 11 November 1967. Pope Paul VI approved it on 3 October 1975 and beatified Bertoni on 1 November 1975.

The miracle involved the cure of Giuseppe Anselmi - a priest of the Stigmatines - who had severe stomach complications and was cured in Brasília on 28 May 1937.

=== Canonisation ===
The second miracle required for sanctification received validation from the Congregation for the Causes of Saints on 30 November 1984, while it received the papal approval of Pope John Paul II at the beginning of 1989. He canonised Bertoni on 1 November 1989.

== Congregation of Sacred Stigmata of Our Lord Jesus Christ ==
=== Philippines ===
The impact of St. Gaspar Bertoni's legacy extended beyond Italy. On June 1, 1985, in collaboration with Manila Archbishop H.E. Jaime Lachica Cardinal Sin, D.D. and the Stigmatine Fathers & Brothers established the only church in the country and Asia dedicated to the Sacred Stigmata of Our Lord Jesus Christ. The Parish of the Five Wounds of Our Lord Jesus Christ, Municipality of Las Piñas, +Rev. Fr. Danilo Panato, CSS, became the inaugural Parish Priest. The Novena to the Five Wounds of Jesus Christ is prayed in the parish church every Friday (Day of devotion to the Five Wounds of Jesus Christ - with Ecclesiastical approval). The Parish Feast Day is joyously celebrated every Third Sunday of Easter (Approved by local ordinary).

Between year 1989 and 1991, the Stigmatine and Parish Community commissioned the original and venerated image of the Parish Titular Patron "Five Wounds of Jesus Christ." (Resurrected Jesus with His Five Glorious Wounds, depicted in the Gospel of John 20:24-29).

Further testament to the devotion inspired by St. Gaspar Bertoni occurred on January 14, 2012, when Most Rev. Jesse Eugenio Mercado, D.D., Bishop of the Diocese of Parañaque, elevated the church to a Diocesan Shrine of the Five Wounds of Our Lord Jesus Christ, the very first Shrine in Las Piñas City, +Rev. Fr. Dennis Jesus L. Batacandolo, CSS, assumed the role of the first Shrine Rector, embodying the enduring love and devotion of people to the Five Wounds of Jesus Christ in modern times. The Chaplet of the Five Wounds of Jesus Christ is prayed in the Shrine every day except on Friday (Daily prayer to the Five Wounds of Jesus Christ - with Nihil Obstat and Imprimatur of Bishop of Parañaque.)

== Scuole Alle Stimate ==
Scuole Alle Stimate is a middle and high school in the center of Verona, Italy and founded by Bertoni in 1816. There is a Classical High School, where the main subjects are Greek and Latin; a Scientific High School where the main subjects are maths and biology; in the Linguistic High School Spanish, German and English are taught. The school houses a library which holds a precious collection of books that were bought by Bertoni.
