= Luigi Pappacoda =

Italian Roman Catholic prelate

Most Reverend Luigi Pappacoda
- Bishop of Lecce
- Church: Catholic Church
- Diocese: Diocese of Lecce
- In office: 1639–1670
- Predecessor: Scipione Spina
- Successor: Antonio Pignatelli del Rastrello
- Previous post: Bishop of Capaccio (1635–1639)

Orders
- Consecration: 18 February 1635 by Francesco Maria Brancaccio

Personal details
- Born: 20 September 1595 Pisciotta, Italy
- Died: 17 December 1670 (age 75) Lecce, Italy

Luigi Pappacoda (20 September 1595 – 17 December 1670) was a Roman Catholic prelate who served as the Bishop of Lecce (1639–1670) and the Bishop of Capaccio (1635–1639).

== Biography ==
Luigi Pappacoda was born in Pisciotta, Italy on 20 September 1595. On 12 February 1635, he was appointed during the papacy of Pope Urban VIII as Bishop of Capaccio. On 18 February 1635, he was consecrated bishop by Francesco Maria Brancaccio, Cardinal-Priest of Santi XII Apostoli, with Carlo Carafa, Bishop of Aversa, and Pier Luigi Carafa, Bishop of Tricarico, serving as co-consecrators. On 30 May 1639, he was appointed during the papacy of Pope Urban VIII as Bishop of Lecce. He served as Bishop of Lecce until his death on 17 December 1670.

While bishop, he was the principal co-consecrator of Camillo Ragona, Bishop of Acerno (1644).

== External links and additional sources ==
- Cheney, David M. "Diocese of Vallo della Lucania". Catholic-Hierarchy.org. (for Chronology of Bishops) ^{[self-published]}
- Chow, Gabriel. "Diocese of Vallo della Lucania (Italy)". GCatholic.org. (for Chronology of Bishops) ^{[self-published]}
- Cheney, David M. "Archdiocese of Lecce". Catholic-Hierarchy.org. (for Chronology of Bishops) ^{[self-published]}
- Chow, Gabriel. "Metropolitan Archdiocese of Lecce (Italy)". GCatholic.org. (for Chronology of Bishops) ^{[self-published]}

Catholic Church titles
Preceded by Francesco Maria Brancaccio	Bishop of Capaccio; 1635–1639	Succeeded by Tommaso Carafa
Preceded by Scipione Spina	Bishop of Lecce; 1639–1670	Succeeded by Antonio Pignatelli del Rastrello
