= Diocese of Vallo della Lucania =

Latin Catholic diocese in Italy

Coordinates: 40.2333°N 15.2667°E

Diocese of Vallo della Lucania Dioecesis Vallensis in Lucania

Catholic
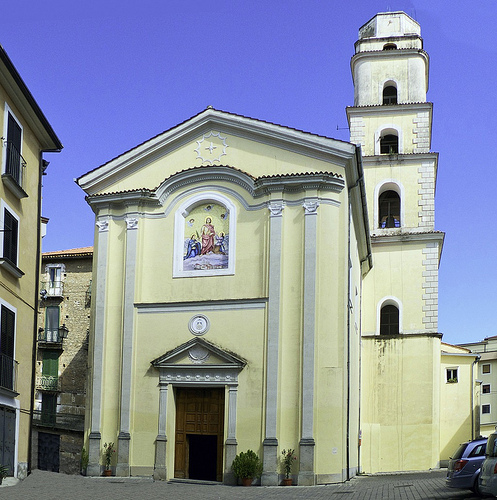
- San Pantaleone church

Location
- Country: Italy
- Ecclesiastical province: Salerno-Campagna-Acerno

Statistics
- Area: 1,563 km^{2} (603 sq mi)
- Population: Total; Catholics: (as of 2023); 158,200 (est.) ▼; 156,300 (est.) ▼ (98.8%)
- Parishes: 140

Information
- Denomination: Catholic Church
- Sui iuris church: Latin Church
- Rite: Roman Rite
- Established: 12th Century
- Cathedral: Cattedrale di S. Pantaleone
- Secular priests: 74 (diocesan) ▼15 (Religious Orders); 8 Permanent Deacons

Current leadership
- Pope: Leo XIV
- Bishop: Vincenzo Calvosa
- Metropolitan Archbishop: Andrea Bellandi

Website
- www.diocesivallodellalucania.it

The Diocese of Vallo della Lucania (Latin: Dioecesis Vallensis in Lucania) is a Latin Church diocese of the Catholic Church in Campania, Italy. It has existed under this name since 1945, having previously been known as the Diocese of Capaccio and Vallo.

It is a suffragan of the Archdiocese of Salerno-Campagna-Acerno.

== Bishops ==
=== Diocese of Capaccio ===
Latin Name: Caputaquensis
Erected: 12th Century

- Giovanni Bonifacio Panella (16 May 1399 –1407)

...

- Bernardus Caracciolo Pisquizi (1422–1425)
- Barthélémy (25 Sep 1439 – 1441 Died)

...

- Ausias Despuig (9 Aug 1476 – 2 Sep 1483 Died)
- Ludovico Podocathor (14 Nov 1483 –1503)
- Luigi d'Aragona (20 Jan 1503 – 22 Mar 1514 Resigned)
- Lorenzo Pucci (10 Sep 1522 – 12 Jun 1523 Resigned)
- Tommaso Caracciolo (archbishop of Capua) (12 Jun 1523 – 1531 Resigned)
- Enrico Loffredo (18 Dec 1531 – Jan 1547 Died)
- Francesco Sfondrati (23 Mar 1547 – 9 Nov 1549 Appointed, Archbishop (Personal Title) of Cremona)
- Girolamo Verallo (9 Nov 1549 – 1 Mar 1553 Resigned)
- Paolo Emilio Verallo (1 Mar 1553 – 1584 Resigned)
- Lorenzo Belo (22 May 1584 – 1586 Died)
- Lelio Morelli (16 Jun 1586 – 1609 Died)
- Giovanni Vitelli, C.R. (14 Dec 1609 – 1610 Died)
- Pedro de Mata y Haro, C.R. (28 Feb 1611 – 3 Mar 1627 Died)
- Francesco Maria Brancaccio (9 Aug 1627 – 12 Feb 1635 Resigned)
- Luigi Pappacoda (12 Feb 1635 – 30 May 1639 Appointed, Bishop of Lecce)
- Tommaso Carafa (11 Jul 1639 – 7 Dec 1664 Died)
- Camillo Ragona (13 Apr 1665 – 1 Aug 1677 Died)
- Andrea Bonito, C.O. (14 Jun 1677 – 2 Feb 1684 Died)
- Giovanni Battista De Pace, C.O. (5 Jun 1684 – 20 Nov 1698 Died)
- Vincenzo Corcione (11 Apr 1699 – 8 Nov 1703 Died)
- Francesco Paolo Nicolai (21 Jul 1704 – 2 Sep 1716 Appointed, Archbishop of Conza)
- Carlo Francesco Giocoli (15 Mar 1717 – 14 Dec 1723 Died)
- Agostino Odoardi, O.S.B. (14 Feb 1724 – 25 Jun 1741 Died)
- Pietro Antonio Raimondi (22 Jan 1742 – 15 Apr 1768 Died)
- Angelo Maria Zuccari (16 May 1768 – 26 Dec 1794 Died)
- Vincenzo Torrusio (18 Dec 1797 – 29 Oct 1804 Appointed, Bishop of Nola)
- Filippo Speranza (29 Oct 1804 – 12 Aug 1834 Died)
- Michele Barone (6 Apr 1835 Confirmed – 7 Oct 1842 Died)
- Giuseppe Maria d'Alessandro (19 Jun 1843 Confirmed – 24 Nov 1845 Confirmed, Bishop of Sessa Aurunca)
- Gregorio Fistilli (24 Nov 1845 Confirmed – 26 Sep 1848 Resigned)
- Francesco Giampaolo (23 Mar 1855 Confirmed – 20 Jun 1859 Confirmed, Bishop of Larino)

=== Diocese of Capaccio e Vallo della Lucania ===
Latin Name: Caputaquensis et Vallensis
Name Changed: 16 July 1851

- Giovanni Battista Siciliani, O.F.M. Conv. (20 Jun 1859 Confirmed – 24 Oct 1876 Died)
- Pietro Maglione (18 Dec 1876 – 17 Dec 1900 Resigned)
- Paolo Jacuzio (17 Dec 1900 – 9 Jul 1917 Appointed, Archbishop of Sorrento)
- Francesco Cammarota (22 Dec 1917 – 15 Dec 1935 Died)
- Raffaele De Giuli (17 Jun 1936 – 18 Feb 1946 Appointed, Bishop of Albenga)

=== Diocese of Vallo di Lucania ===
Latin Name: Vallensis in Lucania
Name Changed: 24 November 1945

- Domenico Savarese (11 Jan 1947 – 3 Oct 1955 Died)
- Biagio d'Agostino (24 Feb 1956 – 26 Oct 1974 Retired) (Note: d'Agostino took part in the Second Vatican Council.)
- Giuseppe Casale (26 Oct 1974 – 7 May 1988 Appointed, Archbishop of Foggia-Bovino)
- Giuseppe Rocco Favale (4 Mar 1989 – 7 May 2011 Retired)
- Ciro Miniero (7 May 2011 – 19 Oct 2022 Appointed, Coadjutor Archbishop of Taranto)
  - Apostolic Administrator Ciro Miniero (19 Oct 2022 – 24 Jun 2023)
- Vincenzo Calvosa (5 Apr 2023 – Present)

== Bibliography ==
=== Reference works ===
- Gams, Pius Bonifatius (1873). Series episcoporum Ecclesiae catholicae: quotquot innotuerunt a beato Petro apostolo. Ratisbon: Typis et Sumptibus Georgii Josephi Manz. p. 870-871.(Use with caution; obsolete)
- Eubel, Conradus, ed. (1913). Hierarchia catholica (in Latin). Vol. Tomus 1 (second ed.). Münster: Libreria Regensbergiana.
- Eubel, Conradus, ed. (1914). Hierarchia catholica (in Latin). Vol. Tomus 2 (second ed.). Münster: Libreria Regensbergiana.
- Eubel, Conradus; Gulik, Guilelmus (1923). Hierarchia catholica (in Latin). Vol. Tomus 3 (second ed.). Münster: Libreria Regensbergiana.
- Gauchat, Patritius (Patrice) (1935). Hierarchia catholica. Vol. Tomus IV (1592-1667). Münster: Libraria Regensbergiana.
- Ritzler, Remigius; Sefrin, Pirminus (1952). Hierarchia catholica medii et recentis aevi. Vol. Tomus V (1667-1730). Patavii: Messagero di S. Antonio.
- Ritzler, Remigius; Sefrin, Pirminus (1958). Hierarchia catholica medii et recentis aevi. Vol. Tomus VI (1730-1799). Patavii: Messagero di S. Antonio.
- Ritzler, Remigius; Sefrin, Pirminus (1968). Hierarchia Catholica medii et recentioris aevi (in Latin). Vol. VII (1800–1846). Monasterii: Libreria Regensburgiana.
- Remigius Ritzler; Pirminus Sefrin (1978). Hierarchia catholica Medii et recentioris aevi (in Latin). Vol. VIII (1846–1903). Il Messaggero di S. Antonio.
- Pięta, Zenon (2002). Hierarchia catholica medii et recentioris aevi (in Latin). Vol. IX (1903–1922). Padua: Messagero di San Antonio. ISBN 978-88-250-1000-8.

=== Studies ===
- Cappelletti, Giuseppe (1866). Le chiese d'Italia: dalla loro origine sino ai nostri giorni : opera (in Italian). Vol. vigesmo (20). Venice: G. Antonelli. pp. 331–365.
- Collezione degli atti emanati dopo la pubblicazione del Concordato dell'anno 1818: contenente i brevi e le lettere apostoliche, i reali decreti e rescritti, le circolari ed istruzioni pubblicate da aprile 1840 a tutto dicembre 1841; non che una copiosa appendice a' precedenti volumi. 9 (in Italian and Latin). Vol. Parte nona (9). Napoli: Stamperia dell'Iride. 1842.
- Kamp, Norbert (1973). Kirche und Monarchie im staufischen Königreich Sizilien. Prosopographische Grundlegung. Bistümer und Bischöfe des Königreichs 1194-1266. 1. Abruzzen und Kampanien, Munich 1973, pp. 454-459. (in German)
- Kehr, Paul Fridolin (1925). Italia pontificia Vol. VIII (Berlin: Weidmann 1925), pp. 276–278. (in Latin)
- Ughelli, Ferdinando; Coleti, Niccolo (1721). Italia sacra sive De episcopis Italiæ, et insularum adjacentium (in Latin). Vol. Tomus septimus (7). Venice: apud Sebastianum Coleti. pp. 464–483.
