= Roman Catholic Diocese of Mottola =

Diocese of Mottola Dioecesis Motulensis Diocesi di Mottola
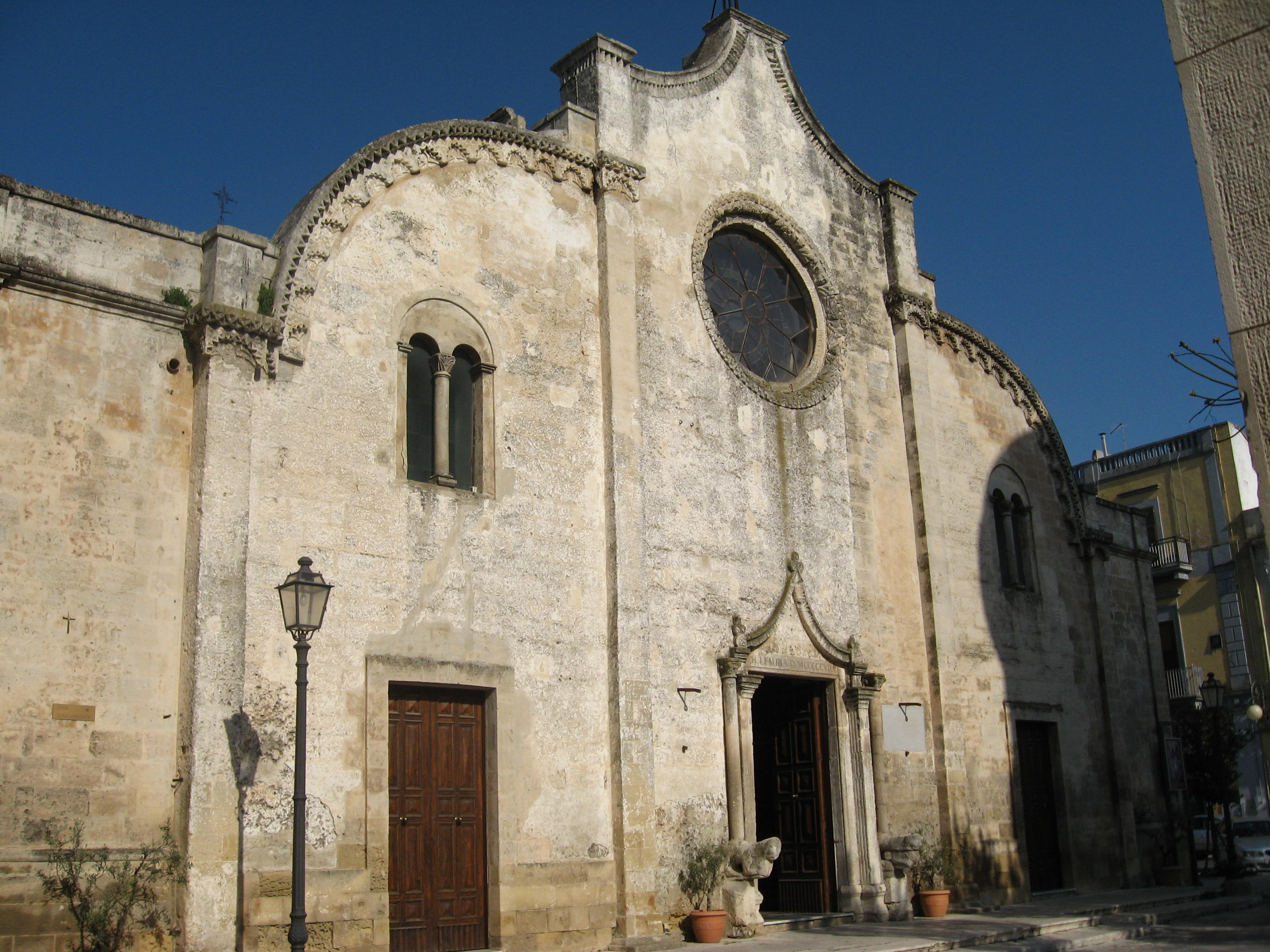
- Cathedral of Mottola

Location
- Country: Italy
- Territory: Mottola, Palagiano, Massafra, and Palagianello

Information
- Denomination: Catholic
- Sui iuris church: Latin Church
- Established: 11th century
- Dissolved: June 27, 1818
- Cathedral: Chiesa di Santa Maria Assunta

Leadership
- Titular Archbishop: Gianfranco Gallone

The Diocese of Mottola or Diocese of Motula (Latin: Dioecesis Motulensis) was a Roman Catholic diocese located in the town of Mottola in the province of Taranto in the region of Apulia in southeast Italy. In 1818, it was suppressed to the Diocese of Castellaneta.

Since 1968, the diocese has periodically been a titular see.

== Territory ==
The diocese included the villages of Mottola, Palagiano, Massafra and Palagianello.

The episcopal see was the town of Mottola, where the church of Santa Maria Assunta, also dedicated to Saint Thomas Becket, patron of the city, served as a cathedral.

== History ==
The Diocese of Mottola was erected in Norman times, after they conquered the city in 1023. The first bishop historically documented is John, mentioned in the diploma of 1081 in which Riccardo Siniscalco, Lord of Mottola and Castellaneta, donated some churches of Mottola and Massafra at the abbey of Cava, "assensum Ioannis Mutulensis episcopi," that is, "with the consent of John, the bishop of Mottola."

The next Bishop of Mottola was Amuro, who in December 1100 confirmed for Abbot Orso of Santa Maria di Banzi his possession of the church of San Matteo in the territory of Castellaneta. In the diploma Amuro he signs as Mutulensis atque Castellanitensis ecclesie presul, bishop of the church of Mottola and Castellaneta, suggesting that at the time the two dioceses were united with one bishop. However, the union must have been short-lived, because in 1110 the Diocese of Mottola was again autonomous. In that year Bishop Valcauso, who confirmed to the Abbot of Cava the possession of the monasteries of Sant'Angelo and of San Vito di Casalrotto, of some churches, lands and other goods.

Since its foundation, the Diocese was part of the ecclesiastical province of the Archdiocese of Taranto.

The Diocese of Mottola had several notable bishops: Bishop Angelo Pascali (1537-1550) participated in the Council of Trent; Scipione Rebiba (1551-1556), later Archbishop of Pisa and Cardinal Ludovico della Quadra (1664-1695), completed the construction Of the Rosary Chapel; in 1600 Bishop Silvestro Tufo established the diocesan seminary, and Michele Palmieri (1798-1804) was the last bishop of Mottola.

Fourteen years after the death of Palmieri, a period in which the seat remained vacant, with the agreement (6 February 1818) between Pope Pius VII and Ferdinand I of Bourbon King of Naples, the diocese was suppressed and its territories were united to the diocese of Castellaneta . This act was effected on June 27, 1818, with De utiliori of Pius VII.

Mottola has been a titular bishopric of the Catholic Church since 1968. Angelo De Donatis, was named titular bishop of Mottola in September 2015 and then titular archbishop of Mottola in May 2017. He ceased to hold the title upon being made a cardinal. Gianfranco Gallone, newly appointed Apostolic Nuncio to Zambia and Malawi, has been the titular archbishop of Mottola since being consecrated a bishop on 19 March 2019.

== Ordinaries ==
=== Diocese of Mottola ===
Erected: 1023
Latin Name: Motulensis
Metropolitan: Archdiocese of Taranto

- Ciliberto de Fumis (Appointed 1040 – )

...

- Nicola de Genupia (17 Mar 1468 – 1471 Died)

...

- Pietro Guercio (de Quercius) (13 Aug 1512 – 1524 Died)
- Guido Guidone (10 Feb 1525 – 1528 Died)
- Vito Ferrato (7 Aug 1528 – 1537 Died)
- Angelo Pasquali, O.P. (6 Mar 1537 – 1550 Died)
- Scipione Rebiba (12 Oct 1551 – 13 Apr 1556 Appointed, Archbishop of Pisa)
- Cesare Gesualdo (13 Mar 1560 – 1566 Died)
- Giovanni Ludovico da Campania (5 Jul 1566 – 1579 Died)
- Jaime Miguel Miguélez (3 Aug 1579 – 1599 Died)
- Silvestro Tufo, C.R. (29 Nov 1599 – Oct 1600 Died)
- Benedetto Rossi, C.R. (3 Dec 1601 – 1622 Died)
- Francesco Saluzzo (2 May 1622 – 1627 Resigned)
- Serafino Rinaldo (de Nuceria), O.P. (14 Apr 1627 – 27 Apr 1627 Died)
- Tommaso d'Ancora (Tommaso Ariconi), C.R. (9 Sep 1630 – 8 Jan 1635 Confirmed, Archbishop of Trani)
- Giovanni Battista Falesi, O.P. (15 Jan 1638 – 1648 Died)
- Tommaso d'Aquino, C.R. (24 Aug 1648 – 1651 Died)
- Giovanni Camponeschi, O.F.M. (22 Jun 1654 – 1657 Died)
- Gennaro De Andrea (8 Aug 1661 – 1664 Died)
- Ludovico della Quadra (21 Jul 1664 – 15 Jan 1695 Resigned)
- Francesco della Marra (2 Apr 1696 – Aug 1696 Died)
- Michele Maria Dentice (27 Mar 1697 – Oct 1698 Died)

...

- Pier Paolo Mastrilli (26 Nov 1703 – 7 Apr 1713 Died)
- Biagio Antonio Copeti (15 May 1719 – May 1727 Died)
- Antonio Bianchi di Gennaro, O.F.M. (24 Apr 1728 Confirmed – Aug 1729 Died)
- Giovanni Antonio Chiaiese (12 Feb 1731 – Aug 1732 Died)
- Nicola Paolo Pandolfelli (20 Jan 1734 – 19 Apr 1766 Died)
- Stefano (Ildefonso) Ortiz Cortes, O.S.B. (2 Jun 1766 – Mar 1791 Died)
- Agostino Andriani (18 Jun 1792 – 1795 Died)
- Michele Palmieri (29 Jan 1798 – 29 Oct 1804 Appointed, Bishop of Troia)

1818: Suppressed to the Diocese of Castellaneta

=== Titular See ===
- Bernard Joseph McLaughlin (28 December 1968 – 5 January 2015)
- Angelo De Donatis (14 September 2015 – 28 June 2018)
- Gianfranco Gallone (2 February 2019 - present)
