= Capaccio =

Capaccio is a surname. Notable people with the surname include:

- Julius Capaccio (1552–1634), Italian humanist
- Mike Capaccio (born 1957), American athletics administrator

== See also ==
- Capaccio Paestum
