= Antonio Banchieri =

Italian cardinal (1667–1733)

His Eminence Antonio Banchieri
- Cardinal Secretary of State
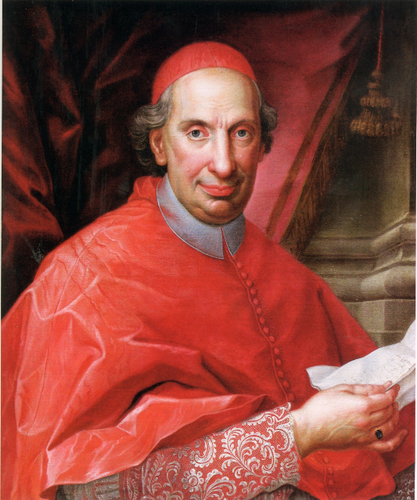
- Portrait by Agostino Masucci, 1728
- Church: Catholic Church
- Appointed: 15 July 1730
- Term ended: 16 September 1733
- Predecessor: Niccolò Maria Lercari
- Successor: Giuseppe Firrao
- Other posts: Cardinal-Deacon San Nicola in Carcere (1723–1733)

Orders
- Created cardinal: 9 December 1726 by Pope Benedict XIII
- Rank: Cardinal-Deacon

Personal details
- Born: 19 May 1667 Pistoia, Italy
- Died: 16 September 1733 (aged 66) Pistoia, Italy
- Coat of arms

Antonio Banchieri (19 May 1667 - 16 September 1733) was an Italian cardinal.

== Life ==
Born in Pistoia, he belonged to the Banchieri noble family and was the son of Niccolò, gonfaloniere of Pistoia and knight of Santo Stefano, and his wife lady Caterina Rospigliosi. His uncles were cardinals Giacomo Oddi and Giovanni Francesco Banchieri. On his mother's side he was a great-grandson of pope Clement IX and nephew of cardinals Giacomo Rospigliosi and Felice Rospigliosi. He began his studies at the Collegio Tolomei in Siena in 1679, before moving to the Seminario Romano in Rome, graduating as a doctor utroque iure on 10 July 1692.

During the pontificate of pope Innocent XII, he was made participating apostolic protonotary on 27 June 1692 and then referandario to the Apostolic Signatura on 16 July 1692, a role he held until 1725. He also became relatore to the Sacra Congregazione della Sacra Consulta and then consultore to the Sacred Congregation of Rites. He became ruling secretary to the Sacra Congregazione della Propaganda Fide in the absence of secretary Agostino Fabroni in July 1702 and consistorial advocate and vice-legate to Avignon from 23 December 1702 to 8 August 1706.

In 1706, the pope intended to make him apostolic nuncio to France, but Banchieri declined the role since it would require him to be ordained a priest. He was made secretary to the Sacra Congregazione della Propaganda Fide in May 1706 and then assessor of the Suprema Sacra congregazione della Romana and the Universal Inquisition in August 1707. He was secretary to the Sacra consulta from 3 October 1712 to 1724, then a member of the Special Congregation which discussed the "Riflessioni morali sul Nuovo Testamento" (Moral Reflections on the New Testament) by the Jansenist Pasquier Quesnel.. He also served as governor of Rome and vice-camerlengo from 30 September 1724 to 30 April 1728.

He was made a cardinal in pectore in the consistory of 9 December 1726 - his appointment was made public in the consistory of 30 April 1728 and he received his cardinal's biretta and the titulus of San Nicola in Carcere on 10 May that year. He took part in the 1730 conclave which elected pope Clement XII, who made Banchieri Secretary of State and prefect of the Sacra Consulta on 15 July 1730, roles he held until his death. In 1730, he became a member of the "De nonnullis" Congregation, in which he clashed with cardinal Niccolò Coscia. He was also later made prefect of the Holy House of Loreto, of the city of Fermo and of the Comtat Venaissin. He had an apoplexic fit in July 1733 and was critically ill for a time, before recovering. This did force him to retire to his home in Pistoia on 29 August that year, where he died only a fortnight later. His body lay in state for public veneration before being buried in Santissimo Nome di Gesù church in Pistoia.
