= Giuseppe Firrao =

Giuseppe Firrao may refer to:

- Giuseppe Firrao (seniore) (1670–1744), Italian cardinal, Cardinal Secretary of State
- Giuseppe Firrao Jr. (1736–1830), Italian cardinal
