= Antonio De Luca (bishop) =

Italian Catholic bishop

His Excellency, The Most Reverend Antonio De Luca, CSsR
- Bishop of Teggiano-Policastro
- Diocese: Teggiano-Policastro
- Appointed: 26 November 2011
- Installed: 4 February 2012
- Predecessor: Angelo Spinillo

Personal details
- Born: 1 July 1956 (age 70) Torre del Greco, Campania, Italy
- Denomination: Roman Catholic
- Motto: Latin: Dum omni modo Christus adnuntietur
- Coat of arms: Antonio De Luca, CSsR's coat of arms

Ordination history of Antonio De Luca
History
Episcopal consecration
- Principal consecrator: Crescenzio Sepe
- Co-consecrators: Joseph W. Tobin, Angelo Spinillo

Antonio Maria De Luca (born 1 July 1956) is an Italian Catholic bishop and a member of the Redemptionist order. He currently serves as the Bishop of Teggiano-Policastro.

== Biography ==
Antonio Maria De Luca was born on 1 July 1956 in the comune of Torre del Greco in Campania, Italy.

=== Priestly ministry ===
After profession his vows in the Congregation of the Most Holy Redeemer on 29 September 1973, De Luca took theology and philosophy courses with the Salesians of Castellammare di Stabia, then obtained a licentiate in moral theology from the San Luigi Papal Theological Seminary of Southern Italy. He was ordained a priest on 5 July 1981 at the Redemptorist church of Colle Sant'Angelo in Torre del Greco and held numerous positions in the Redemptorist order, working for the propagation of the mission abroad (in Madagascar and Argentina).

He then was the director of the Redemptorist missionary school from 1981 to 1990 and was a parish assistant at the Church of SS. Crocifisso in Torre del Greco. From 1990 to 1999, De Luca served as prefect of the students of philosophy and theology at Colle Sant'Angelo. From 1993 to 1999, he was the superior of the community of Redemptorist students and provincial secretary for formation.

De Luca served as dean of the twelfth deanery of the Archdiocese of Naples and was director and professor of moral theology at the training school for pastoral workers from 1998 to 2003. From 1999 to 2008, he was the provincial superior for the province of Naples and in 2001 became the president of the Italian Conference for Major Superiors. In 2007, he became the episcopal pro-vicar for consecrated life in the Archdiocese of Naples. He was also a member of the college of consultors and the presbyteral council for the Archdiocese of Naples.

=== Episcopal ministry ===
On 26 November 2011, Pope Benedict XVI appointed him Bishop of Teggiano-Policastro, succeeding Bishop Angelo Spinillo. He was consecrated a bishop on 7 January 2012 in the Naples Cathedral by Cardinal Crescenzio Sepe and co-consecrators Archbishop Joseph William Tobin and Bishop Angelo Spinillo. As bishop, he took the Latin motto "dum omni modo Christus adnuntietur." De Luca took possession of the diocese on 4 February 2012.

Catholic Church titles
Preceded by Angelo Spinillo	Bishop of Teggiano-Policastro; 2012–present	Incumbent
