= Innico Caracciolo =

Innico Caracciolo may refer to:

- Innico Caracciolo (cardinal, born 1607) (1607–1685), Italian cardinal and archbishop
- Innico Caracciolo (cardinal, born 1642) (1642–1730), Italian cardinal and bishop
