= Guerric =

Guerric or Guerricus is a masculine given name that may refer to:

- Guerric of Igny (d. 1157), Cistercian abbot
- Guerric of Petra (fl. 1167–83), archbishop
- Guerric of Faversham (fl. 1180), abbot
- Guerric of Saint-Quentin (fl. 1241), Dominican theologian
