= Athenogenes =

Athenogenes (Ancient Greek: Ἀθηνογένης) may refer to:

- Athenogenes, date unknown, the author of a work mentioned by Athenaeus, probably a poem, entitled "Cephalion".
- Athenogenes (fl. 320s BC), an Egyptian resident of Athens who was the subject of Hyperides' speech Against Athenogenes
- Athenogenes of Pedachtoë (d. AD 303/4), Сhristian bishop and martyr
- Athenogenes, a grandson of Gregory the Illuminator (d. c. 331)
- Athenogenes of Petra (fl. c. AD 600), Christian bishop
