= Angelo Spinillo =

Italian bishop (born 1951)

- Bishop of Aversa
- Church: Roman Catholic Church
- Province: Province of Salerno
- Diocese: Roman Catholic Diocese of Aversa
- Elected: 18 March 2000 by Pope John Paul II

Orders
- Consecration: 13 May 2000 by Michele Giordano

Personal details
- Born: 1 May 1951 Sant'Arsenio
- Denomination: Roman Catholic Church

Angelo Spinillo (born 1 May 1951, Sant'Arsenio) is an Italian bishop.

== Life and career ==
He obtained a license in prophetic pastoral theology at the Pontifical Theological Faculty of Southern Italy.

On 15 July 1978 he was ordained priest by the bishop Umberto Altomare.

=== Bishop ===
On 18 March 2000, he was elected bishop of Teggiano-Policastro. On 13 May of the same year, he received the episcopal consecration from Cardinal Michele Giordano.

He is a member of the Episcopal Commission for Family and Life.

In 2006, he closed the diocesan synod with the theme "I called you friends".

On 5 June 2007, the diocesan museum of Teggiano reopened after a long closing period. In the same year, at the conclusion of the 18th diocesan pastoral convention, on 19 September 2007, the diocesan beatification process was opened for its predecessor Federico Pezzullo, bishop of Policastro.

In 2009, he founded the diocesan magazine Mete magazine.

In the same year he defended the work of two priests of his diocese who came into conflict with their parishioners: Don Pasquale Pellegrino, from Torre Orsaia, unjustly accused of being the lover of local women, and Don Gianni Citro Lentiscosa, already in shock for the management of a village party with his parishioners who later wanted to remove him after his registration with the PD Italian party. The bishop reminds Fr Gianni Citro that canon law limits the possibilities of political commitment of priests.

On 15 January 2011, he was elected bishop of Aversa, succeeding the archbishop, personal title, Mario Milano.

On 22 May 2012, he was elected, from the 64th General Assembly, vice president, for the south, of the Italian Episcopal Conference, remaining in office for five years.

On 3 January 2013, he was awarded the honorary citizenship of Monte San Giacomo, a small town in the province of Salerno where he had previously been parish priest from 1983 to 1991. Since September of the same year, he also held the office of apostolic administrator of Caserta until 18 May 2014.
