= Innico Caracciolo (cardinal, born 1642) =

18th-century Roman Catholic cardinal

His Eminence Innico Caracciolo
- Cardinal-Priest of San Tommaso in Parione; Bishop of Aversa
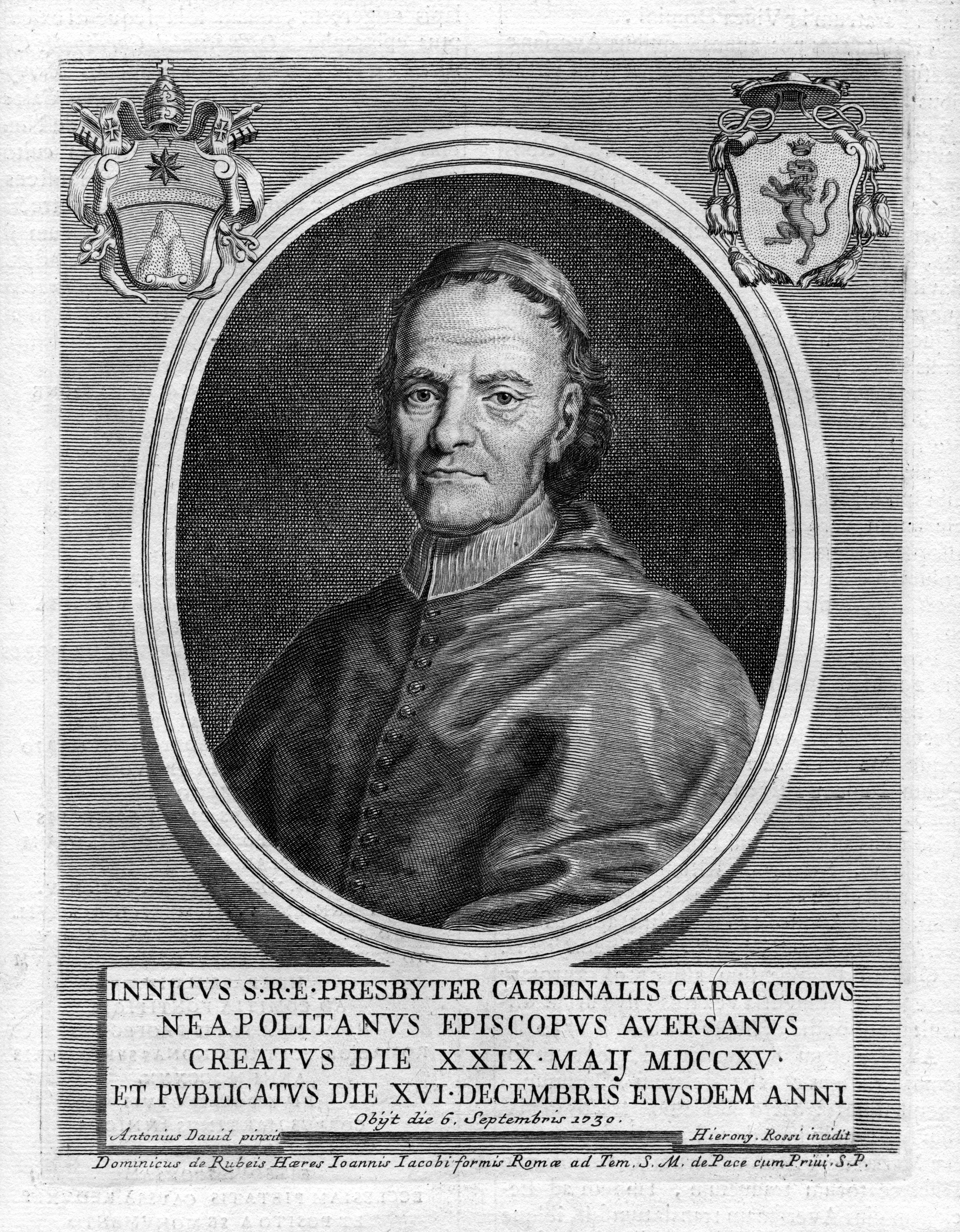
- Church: Catholic Church

Orders
- Consecration: 24 March 1697 by Galeazzo Marescotti

Personal details
- Born: 9 July 1642 Martina Franca, Italy
- Died: 6 September 1730 (age 88) Rome, Italy

Innico Caracciolo di Martina or Innico Caracciolo the Younger (9 July 1642, Martina Franca - 6 September 1730, Rome) was an Italian cardinal.

== Life ==
He was the son of Francesco, duke of Martina and count of Buccino, making him nephew of Innico Caracciolo the Elder. He was appointed inquisitor on Malta on 30 April 1683 and 'referendario' to the tribunals of the Segnatura Apostolica di Giustizia e di Grazia. From 1689 he was primicerius of Santo Spirito in Sassia in Rome. On 10 February 1690, he was made secretary of the Holy Congregation for the discipline of Regular Clergy and of Apostolic Visit. He was proposed for the metropolitan seat of Capua by pope Innocent XI, but declined.

He was elected bishop of Aversa on 25 February 1697 and ordained on 24 March the same year at Chiesa Nuova by cardinal Galeazzo Marescotti, assisted by Francesco Pannocchieschi, archbishop of Pisa and Carlo Loffredo, Archbishop of Bari-Bitonto. He was made clerk of the Camera Apostolica under pope Clement XI and Apostolic Nuncio to Switzerland in 1712. He gave away his stipend and his inheritance to help the poor of the diocese, called a diocesan synod, restored Aversa Cathedral and founded a classical lyceum.

He was made cardinal in pectore in the 29 May 1715 consistory, with the appointment made public on 16 December 1715. He received the titulus of San Tommaso in Parione on 30 March 1716. He took part in the conclaves of 1721, 1724 and 1730, which elected popes Innocent XIII, Benedict XIII and Clement XII respectively. He died on 6 September 1730 at the monastery of Sant'Agata ai Monti in Rome. He was buried in the Santissimo Sacramento Chapel, which he had built in Aversa.

Catholic Church titles
Preceded by Fortunato Ilario Carafa della Spina	Bishop of Aversa; 1697–1730	Succeeded by Giuseppe Firrao (seniore)
Preceded by Bandino Panciatici	Cardinal-Priest of San Tommaso in Parione; 1716–1730	Succeeded by Giuseppe Firrao (seniore)
Records
Preceded by Galeazzo Marescotti	Oldest living Member of the Sacred College; 5 July 1726 - 6 September 1730	Succeeded by Giuseppe Renato Imperiali
