= Archbishop of Petra =

Catholic titular archdiocese

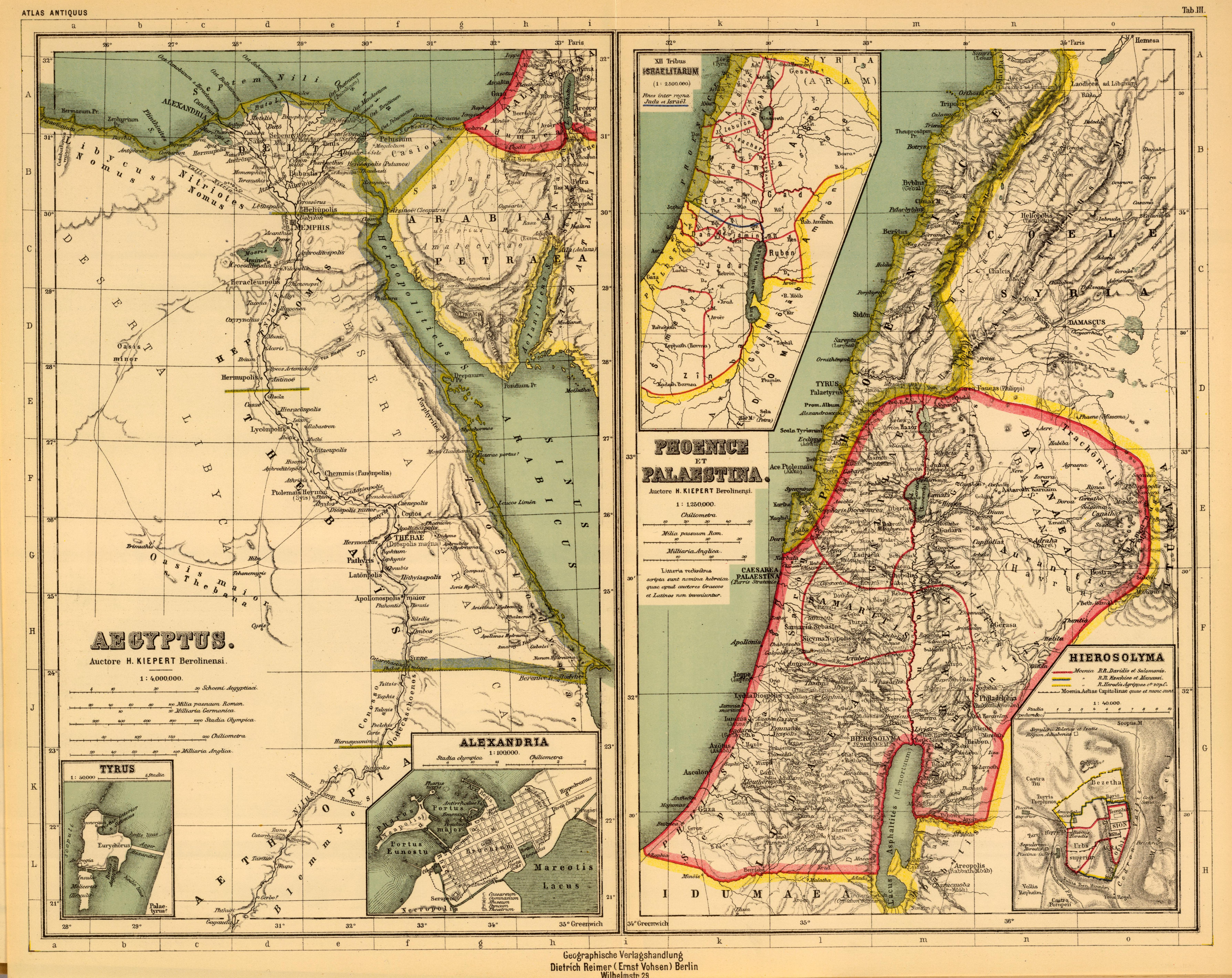
Map of diocese.

The archbishop of Petra was the metropolitan bishop of the province of Palaestina Tertia.

== History ==
The Islamic conquest in the 7th century had eliminated Byzantine control of the area and with it the protection of the Christian communities. However, Palestinian and Syrian Christian communities had remained in the region well into the Islamic occupation period. Re-established during the Crusader era, the diocese covered the Oultrejordain area and included Saint Catherine's Monastery on Mount Sinai, although Crusader protection rarely extended that far. Frankish communities soon added to their number and before Saladin's reconquest, the area had an increasing number of Catholic communities. Following the destruction of the Kingdom of Jerusalem by Saladin, what little protection for Christians had existed was eliminated and the nascent Christian communities were soon destroyed.

Nonetheless, several isolated monasteries at various levels of precarious existence continued, thereby creating the necessity of appointing archbishops well into the modern period. However, by the late 19th and early 20th centuries what vestiges of monastic life and their few extant congregants which remained were effectively eliminated by Bedouin and Turkish raids and with it the diocese lapsed.

== Ancient bishops ==
- Asterius (fl. 343–362)
- Germanus (fl. 359), an Arian
- Jason (fl. 446)
- John (fl. 457)
- Theodore (fl. 536)
- Athenogenes (late 6th/early 7th century)

== Resident Catholic archbishops ==
- Guerricus (1167/8–1189/90)

== Titular Catholic archbishops ==
- Antonio Viedma Chaves, O.P. (20 Mar 1623 Appointed - 8 Mar 1631 Succeeded, Bishop of Almería)
- Vicente Agustín Clavería (28 Jul 1631 Appointed - 27 Jun 1639 Appointed, Bishop of Bosa)
- Saint François de Laval de Montmorency (11 Apr 1658 Appointed - 1 Oct 1674 Appointed, Bishop of Québec)
- Albertus Stawowski (23 Mar 1676 Appointed - )
- Antonio Saverio Gentili (17 Mar 1727 Appointed - 10 Apr 1747 Appointed, Cardinal-Bishop of Palestrina)
- Federico Marcello Lante Montefeltro della Rovere (1 Oct 1732 Appointed - 5 Apr 1745 Installed, Cardinal-Priest of San Pancrazio)
- Filippo Acciaiuoli (2 Dec 1743 Appointed - 6 Apr 1761 Installed, Cardinal-Priest of Santa Maria degli Angeli)
- Giuseppe Simonetti (25 May 1761 Appointed - 1 Dec 1766 Installed, Cardinal-Priest of San Marcello)
- Francesco Saverio de Zelada (23 Dec 1766 Appointed - 26 Apr 1773 Installed, Cardinal-Priest of Santi Silvestro e Martino ai Monti)
- Bernardinus Muti (13 Sep 1773 Appointed - )
- Giuseppe Firrao jr (25 Feb 1782 Appointed - 20 Jul 1801 Installed, Cardinal-Priest of Sant’Eusebio)
- Antonio Gabriele Severoli (28 Sep 1801 Appointed - 11 Jan 1808 Appointed, Archbishop (Personal Title) of Viterbo e Tuscania)

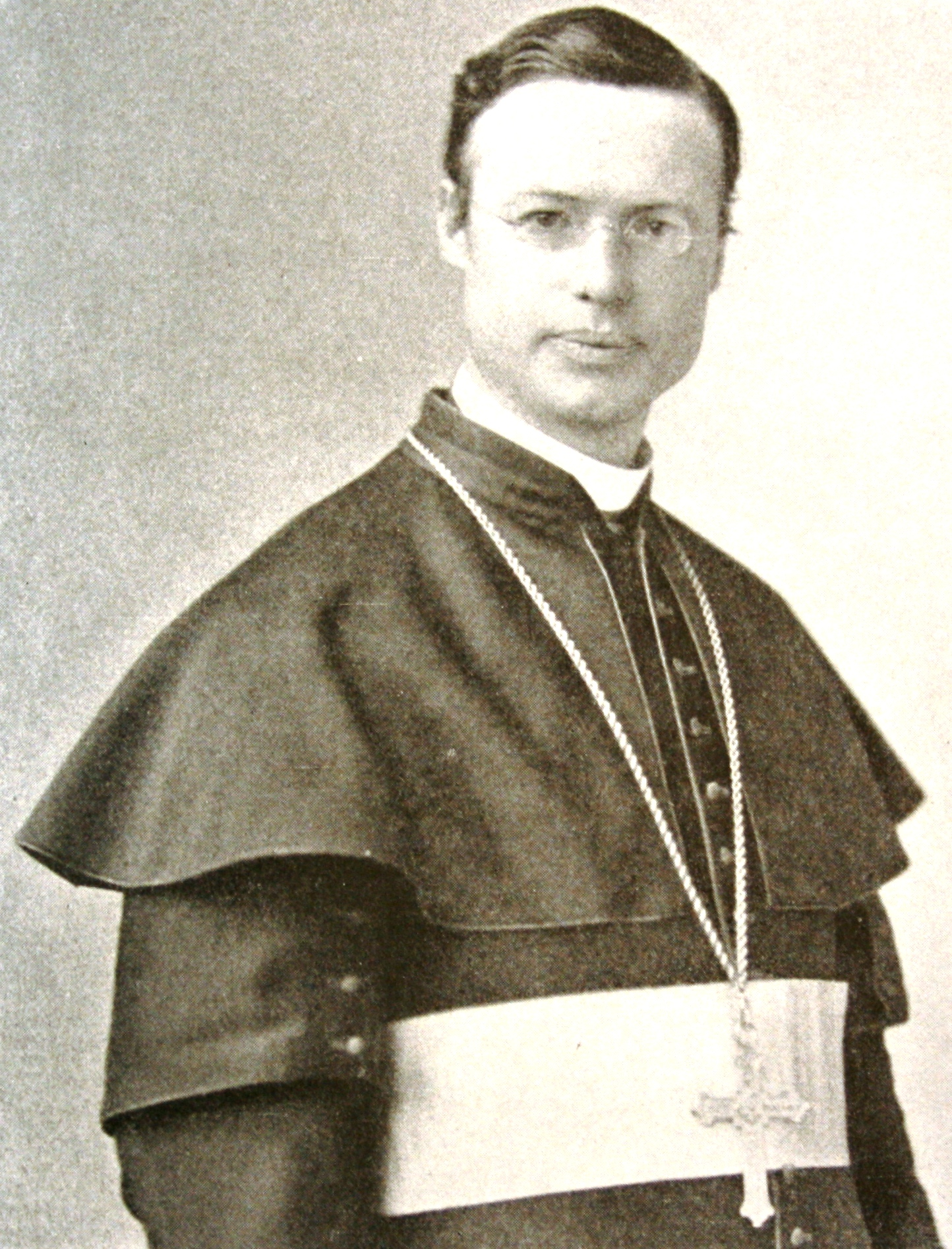
Michael Corrigan (1 Oct 1880 - 10 Oct 1885)

- Alessandro Giustiniani (19 Apr 1822 Appointed - 11 Oct 1843 Died)
- Julianus Maria Hillereau (14 Jun 1833 Appointed - 28 Feb 1855 Died)
- Pietro de Villanova Castellacci (30 Mar 1855 Appointed - 28 Feb 1879 Appointed, Titular Patriarch of Antiochia (Antioch))
- Giuseppe Aggarbati, O.S.A. (12 May 1879 Appointed - 24 May 1880 Died)
- Michael Augustine Corrigan (1 Oct 1880 Appointed - 10 Oct 1885 Succeeded, Archbishop of New York, New York)
- Fulco Luigi Ruffo-Scilla (23 May 1887 Appointed - 17 Dec 1891 Appointed, Cardinal-Priest of Santa Maria in Traspontina)
- Girolamo Maria Gotti, O.C.D. (22 Mar 1892 Appointed - 2 Dec 1895 Appointed, Cardinal-Deacon of Santa Maria della Scala)
- Pietro Gonzalez Carlo Duval, O.P. (29 Nov 1895 Appointed - 31 Jul 1904 Died)
- Bernardino Nozaleda y Villa, O.P. (11 Dec 1905 Appointed - 7 Oct 1927 Died)
- Emilio Ferrais (22 Jun 1928 Appointed - 7 Dec 1928 Succeeded, Archbishop of Catania)
- Luigi Sincero (11 Jan 1929 Appointed - 13 Mar 1933 Appointed, Cardinal-Bishop of Palestrina)
- Angelo Bartolomasi (23 Apr 1929 Appointed - 28 Feb 1959 Died)
- Evelio Díaz y Cía (14 Nov 1959 Appointed - 20 Mar 1963 Succeeded, Archbishop of San Cristobal de la Habana)
- Alfredo Silva Santiago (27 Apr 1963 Appointed - 4 Dec 1970 Resigned)

== See also ==
- Latin Patriarch of Jerusalem
- Archbishop of Caesarea
- Archbishop of Tyre
- Archbishop of Nazareth
