= Pietro Orsini =

Pietro Orsini may refer to:

- Pope Benedict XIII (1650–1730), Roman Catholic Pope
- Pietro Orsini (bishop) (died 1598), Italian Roman Catholic Bishop
