= Giuseppe Firrao Jr. =

Italian Roman Catholic Cardinal

His Eminence Cardinal Giuseppe Firrao Jr.
- Cardinal priest of Sant'Eusebio
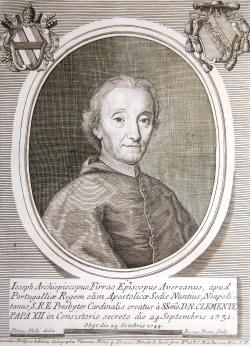
- See: Secretary of the Sacred Congregation of Bishops and Regulars Emeritus
- Installed: 1795-1815
- Successor: Fabrizio Sceberras Testaferrata
- Other post: Previously Titular Archbishop of Petra in Palaestina

Personal details
- Born: 20 July 1736 Fagnano Castello, Calabria, Italy
- Died: 24 January 1830 (aged 93) Naples, Italy

Giuseppe Firrao (20 July 1736 – 24 January 1830) was an Italian Roman Catholic Cardinal.

== Biography ==
Firrao was born in Fagnano Castello, Calabria to Pier Maria Firrao, Prince of Sant'Agata and of Luzi, and Livia Grillo di Agapito, Duchess of Mondragone and Countess of Carinola. He is the Great-nephew of Giuseppe Firrao (seniore). He initiated his formal education in Naples, studied humanities at Collegio Nazareno and later completed a doctorate in canon and civil law at La Sapienza University, Rome. He received the minor orders in the period 1775-1782 and was ordained as a priest on 16 March 1782.

On 25 February 1782 Firrao was elected titular archbishop of Petra in Palaestina and appointed nuncio in Venice on 8 April 1782. He became secretary of the Sacred Congregation of Bishops and Regulars in early 1785.

Pope Pius VII elevated him to cardinal in the consistory of 23 February 1801 with the title of Sant'Eusebio. In the period of 1802 - 1803 he was made Camerlengo of the College of Cardinals and First Priest of the same high ecclesiastical body 1823 - 1830. He took part in the Papal conclave, 1823 and in the next conclave in 1829.

Cardinal Firrao died in Naples and was buried in the metropolitan cathedral.

Records
Preceded by Giovanni Battista Quarantotti	Oldest living Member of the Sacred College; 20 September 1818 - 15 September 1820	Succeeded by Benedetto Naro
