= Giorgio Manzoli =

Most Reverend Giorgio Manzoli
- Bishop of Aversa
- Church: Catholic Church
- Diocese: Diocese of Aversa
- In office: 1582–1591
- Predecessor: Balduino Balduini
- Successor: Pietro Orsini (bishop)

Personal details
- Died: 3 March 1591 Aversa, Italy

Giorgio Manzoli (died 3 March 1591) (Latin: Georgius Manzolus) was a Roman Catholic prelate who served as Bishop of Aversa (1582–1591).

== Biography ==
On 16 May 1582, Giorgio Manzoli was appointed by Pope Gregory XIII as Bishop of Aversa. He served as Bishop of Aversa until his death on 3 Mar 1591.

== External links and additional sources ==
- Cheney, David M. "Diocese of Aversa". Catholic-Hierarchy.org. (for Chronology of Bishops) ^{[self-published]}
- Chow, Gabriel. "Diocese of Aversa (Italy)". GCatholic.org. (for Chronology of Bishops) ^{[self-published]}

Catholic Church titles
Preceded by Balduino Balduini	Bishop of Aversa; 1582–1591	Succeeded by Pietro Orsini (bishop)
