= Giacomo Rospigliosi =

Italian Roman Catholic cardinal (1628–1684)

His Eminence Giacomo Rospigliosi
- Cardinal-Priest of Santi Giovanni e Paolo
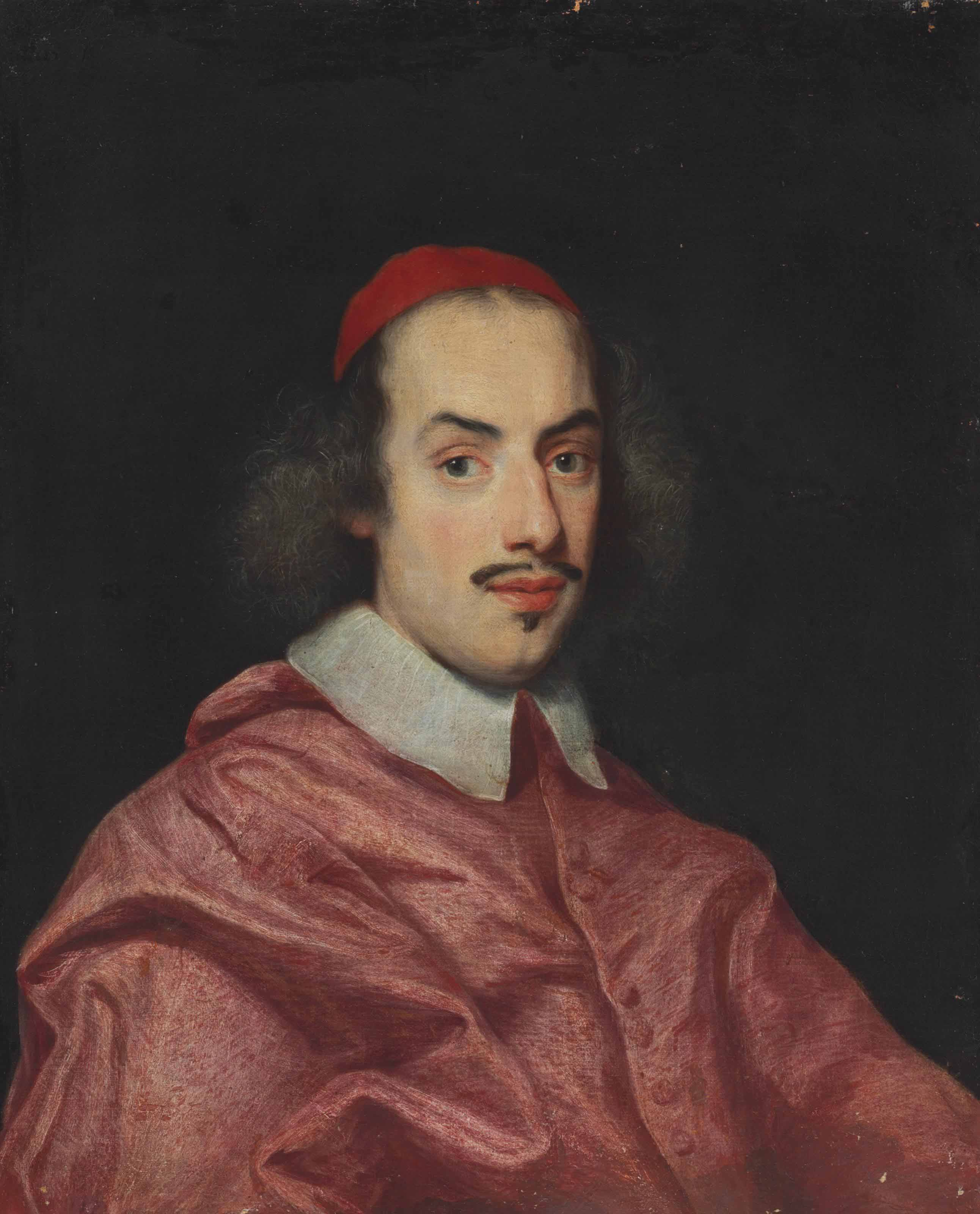
- Portrait of Rospigliosi by Giovanni Battista Gaulli, c. 1667
- Church: Catholic Church
- Appointed: 16 May 1672
- Term ended: 2 February 1684
- Predecessor: Giberto Borromeo
- Successor: Fortunato Ilario Carafa
- Other posts: Archpriest of Santa Maria Maggiore (1671-1684)
- Previous posts: Cardinal-Priest of San Sisto Vecchio (1668–1672)

Orders
- Created cardinal: 12 December 1667 by Pope Clement IX
- Rank: Cardinal-Priest

Personal details
- Born: 1628 Pistoia, Tuscany
- Died: 2 February 1684 (aged 0) Rome, Papal States

Giacomo or Jacopo Rospigliosi (1628 – 2 February 1684) was an Italian Roman Catholic cardinal. He was Cardinal-nephew of Pope Clement IX.

== Biography ==
Born in Pistoia, he was the son of Camillo Rospigliosi and Lucrezia Cellesi, making him the brother of cardinal Felice Rospigliosi, nephew of Giulio Rospigliosi (later Pope Clement IX), cousin of cardinal Carlo Agostino Fabroni, the uncle of cardinal Antonio Banchieri and great-uncle of cardinal Flavio Chigi junior. He studied under the Jesuits in Salamanca and graduated with a degree in utroque jure in 1649.

He went to Rome in 1643 and later returned to Spain with his uncle Giulio, who was then papal nuncio to the Kingdom of Iberia. He was sent on diplomatic missions to Paris and Flanders and later became Prefect of the Tribunal of the Apostolic Signatura in December 1667. He was made a cardinal in the consistory of 12 December 1667 by his uncle, who was now pope, with the title of Cardinal Priest of San Sisto, which he held until 1672, when he chose Santi Giovanni e Paolo as his titulus.

In 1667 he became Archpriest of the Liberian Basilica, a role he held until his death. He also served as governor of Fermo, Tivoli and Capranica and from 1668 to 1680 was tied to Avignon. He took part in the 1669-70 and 1676 papal conclaves. In 1680 he became camerlengo of the College of Cardinals. He died in Rome and was buried in the Basilica of Santa Maria Maggiore.
