= Diocese of Aversa =

Roman Catholic diocese in Italy

Coordinates: 40.9766°N 14.2033°E

Diocese of Aversa Dioecesis Aversana

Catholic
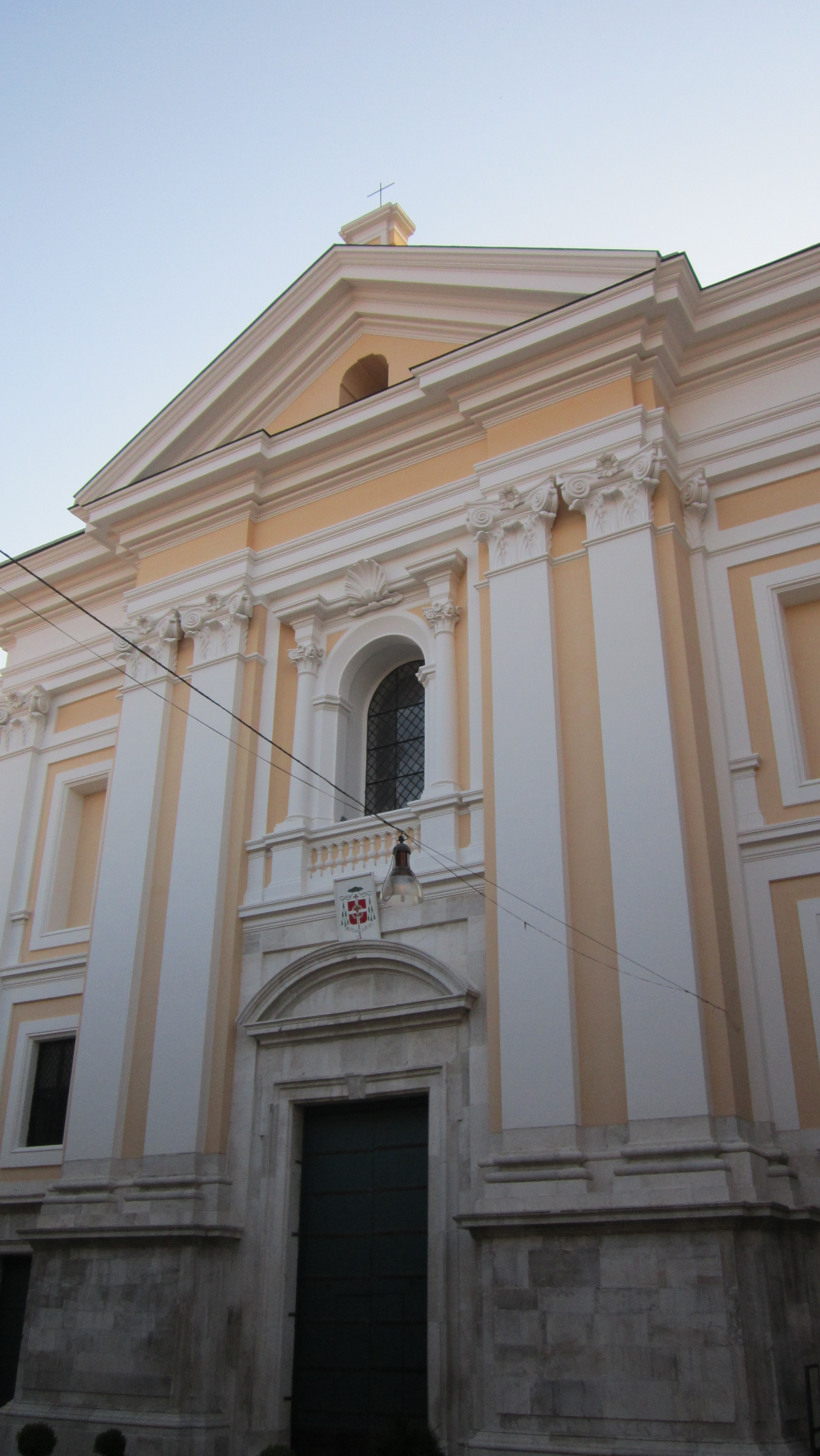
- Aversa Cathedral

Location
- Country: Italy
- Ecclesiastical province: Naples

Statistics
- Area: 361 km^{2} (139 sq mi)
- Population: Total; Catholics: (as of 2015); 567,566; 543,260 (95.7%)
- Parishes: 94

Information
- Denomination: Catholic Church
- Rite: Roman Rite
- Established: 1053 (973 years ago)
- Cathedral: Cattedrale di S. Paolo Apostolo
- Secular priests: 184 (diocesan); 29 (Religious Orders)

Current leadership
- Pope: Leo XIV
- Bishop: Angelo Spinillo

Map
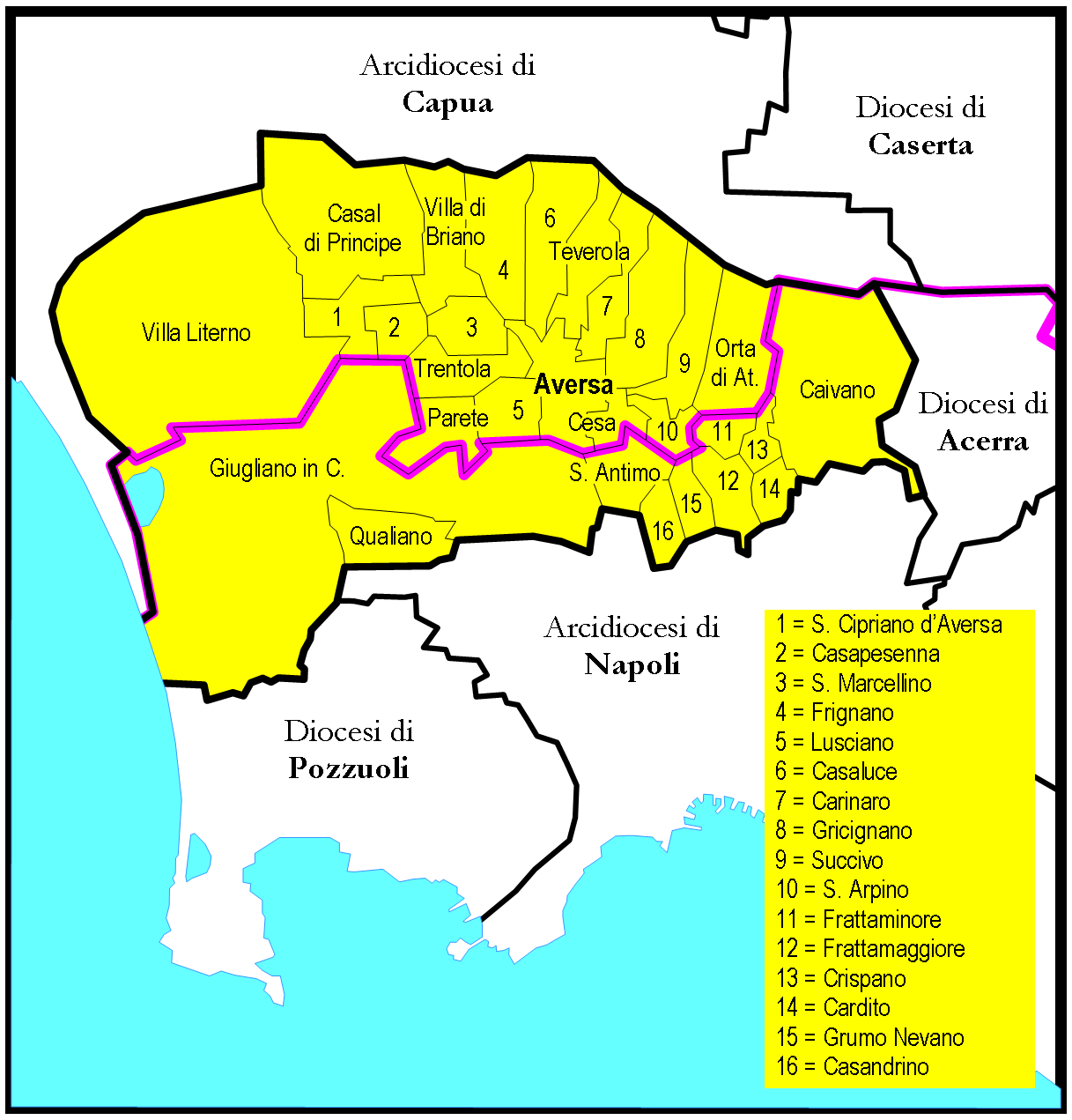

Website
- Diocese of Aversa website (in Italian)

The Diocese of Aversa (Latin: Dioecesis Aversana) is a Latin diocese of the Catholic Church in Campania, southern Italy, created in 1053. It is situated in the Terra di Lavoro (Liburia), seven miles north of Naples, and eight miles south of Capua. It is suffragan of the Archdiocese of Naples.

== History ==
=== Medieval period ===
The city of Atella was destroyed in the Lombard invasions. The city of Aversa arose in the 11th century, near the destroyed Atella, and became the seat of the Norman invader Rainulf, who became a vassal of Duke Sergius of Naples. The Norman Duke Robert Guiscard built a fortification which in time became an urban centre. Duke Robert, becoming a vassal of the pope and supporting him in his struggle with the Holy Roman Emperor, obtained permission from Pope Leo IX to have the extinct diocese of Atella revived at Aversa. In 1058, Count Richard of Aversa became Prince of Capua. This led to an immediate and continual confrontation between Norman Capua and Lombard Naples, both politically and ecclesiastically. The archbishops of Naples claimed metropolitan status over Aversa, with the right to consecrate its bishops and receive oaths of loyalty from them. At the same time the Princes of Capua claimed that Aversa was a new foundation, thanks to their work for the Church, and in no case did the Norman Prince intend to recognize the jurisdiction of the Lombards over his principality.

In September 1089, Pope Urban II consecrated the monk Guitmund, who had been an agent of the Holy See, as Bishop of Aversa at the Synod of Melfi. An immediate protest was lodged by the Archbishop of Naples through his Archdeacon, and by the Prince of Salerno and Amalfi through his legate, humbly requesting that possession of the Church of Aversa be returned to them ("ut sibi tandem Aversane ecclesie possessio redderetur"). In his reply to the Archbishop, Pope Urban stated that he had consecrated Bishop Guitmund neither out of anger or hatred, but for the sake of equity and compelled by necessity, lest the Church of Aversa lose such a man as he had appointed. In a letter to Bishop Guitmund, Pope Urban stated that he and his advisors and the Roman leaders had debated the issue of the possession of the Church of Aversa for some time ("diu causam eventilavimus"), the unanimous decision was that the investiture of the possession of the Church of Aversa should be returned to the Archbishop and the Prince.

On 24 September 1120, Bishop Robertus (attested 1118–1226) obtained from Pope Calixtus II the bull "Sicut ex Fratrum", in which the Church of Aversa was recognized as being directly subordinate (a suffragan) of the Roman See, rather than the Archdiocese of Capua or the Archdiocese of Naples.

In a letter of reply (rescriptum) to the bishop of Aversa on 8 November 1298, Pope Innocent III remarked that the bishop and his predecessors had thus far (hactenus) been accustomed to obtain confirmation of their election and episcopal consecration from the archbishops of Naples, notwithstanding that Innocent's predecessor, Celestine III (1191–1198), had consecrated one "L" as bishop of Aversa himself "without prejudice to the Church of Naples", ordering that the new bishop should show reverence and obedience to the archbishop. If the bishop of Aversa wished to litigate the matter, the Pope would give him a hearing.

On 10 May 1298, Pope Boniface VIII issued a bull, confirming the privileges granted by Pope Calixtus II to the Church of Aversa, making the diocese directly subject to the Holy See.

=== Cathedral and Chapter of Aversa ===
The cathedral was begun thanks to the munificence of Duke Robert Guiscard, was carried forward and completed by his son Jordanus. It was dedicated to S. Paul of Tarsus. The high altar was dedicated by Pope Alexander IV on 3 June 1255.

The cathedral was served and administered by a corporate body, the Chapter, which was composed of four dignities (the Dean, the Cantor, the Archdeacon, and the Subcantor) and thirty Canons. Two dignities were later added, in accordance with the decrees of the Council of Trent, designated the Theologus and the Penitentiarius. Pope Celestine III (1191–1198) granted the Chapter the right of electing their Dean. The cathedral was one of the nine parishes inside the city, the care of which was assigned to the Canons prebendary. Attached to the cathedral were twelve beneficed clerics, whose duty it was to sing the Gregorian chant; two acolytes and six clerics for the sanctuary; and thirty chaplains. The members of the Chapter were paid out of a general fund (mensa canonicata), which was the subject of frequent complaint and litigation. In 1600, it was agreed that the procurator of the Chapter would divide the income into eight portions, six of which would go to each of the six prebendary dignities.

=== Synods ===
A diocesan synod was an irregularly held, but important, meeting of the bishop of a diocese and his clergy. Its purpose was (1) to proclaim generally the various decrees already issued by the bishop; (2) to discuss and ratify measures on which the bishop chose to consult with his clergy; (3) to publish statutes and decrees of the diocesan synod, of the provincial synod, and of the Holy See.

Bishop Pietro Orsini (1591–1598) presided over a diocesan synod at Aversa in 1594, and published its decrees. Bishop Carlo Carafa (1616–1644) held a diocesan synod on 19 June 1619, and published the decrees of the synod. A diocesan synod was held by Bishop Innico Caracciolo (1697–1730) on 4—6 November 1702.

In 1727, Cardinal Innico Caracciolo (1697–1730) issued a new set of Constitutions for the diocesan seminary of Aversa.

=== New ecclesiastical province ===
Following the Second Vatican Council, and in accordance with the norms laid out in the council's decree, Christus Dominus chapter 40, major changes were made in the ecclesiastical administrative structure of southern Italy. Wide consultations had taken place with the bishops and other prelates who would be affected. Action, however, was deferred, first by the death of Pope Paul VI on 6 August 1978, then the death of Pope John Paul I on 28 September 1978, and the election of Pope John Paul II on 16 October 1978. Pope John Paul II issued a decree, "Quamquam Ecclesia," on 30 April 1979, ordering the changes. Three ecclesiastical provinces were abolished entirely: those of Conza, Capua, and Sorrento. A new ecclesiastical province was created, to be called the Regio Campana, whose Metropolitan was the Archbishop of Naples. The diocese of Aversa became a suffragan of Naples.

On January 15, 2011, Pope Benedict XVI appointed Bishop Angelo Spinillo, Bishop of the Roman Catholic Diocese of Teggiano-Policastro, as Bishop of the Roman Catholic Diocese of Aversa. He succeeded Archbishop-Bishop Mario Milano, whose resignation was accepted by the Pope on the grounds that he had reached the canonical age of retirement of 75.

== Bishops of Aversa ==
=== to 1400 ===
- Azolinus (1053– ? )

[Guitmund I]
[Guitmund II]
...

- Guitmund (1089–1094)
- Joannes (attested 1094–1101)
- Robertus (attested 1113)
- Robertus (attested 1118–1126)

...

- Gentilis (attested 1198–1217)
- Basinthius
- Joannes Lambertus
- Fridericus
- Simone Paltanieri (1254– ? ) Administrator
- Joannes (attested 1259)
- Fidentius (attested 1261–1274)
- Adam (attested 1276–1291)
- Landolfo Brancaccio (attested 1293–1297)
- Leonardo Patrasso (17 Jun 1297 –1299)
- Pietro Turrite (1299–1309)
- Petrus de Bolonesio (1309–1324)
- Guilelmus de Sallone, O.Min. (1324–1326)
- Raymond de Mausac, O.Min. (1326–1336)
- Bartholomaeus (1336–1341)
- Giovanni de Glandis (1341–1357)
- Angelo Ricasoli (1357–1370)
- Poncello Orsini (1370–1378)
- Bartolomeo (1378–1380) Avignon Obedience
- Nicolas (1378 or 1379 to 1381) Roman Obedience

Marino del Iudice (1381–1385) Roman Obedience; Administrator

- Ereccius (Erecco) (1386– ? )

...

=== 1400 to 1700 ===
...

- Laurentius da Napoli, O.E.S.A. (c.1416–c.1417)

Cardinal Rinaldo Brancaccio (1418–1427)

- Pietro Caracciolo (1427–1430)
- Giacomo Carafa (1430–1471)
- Pietro (13 May 1471 – 1473)
- Giovanni Paolo Vassalli (10 Mar 1474 – 1501 Died)

Cardinal Luigi d'Aragona (10 Mar 1501 – 21 May 1515) Administrator

- Silvio Pandoni (21 May 1515 – 1519)
- Antonio Scaglioni (1st term) (28 Jan 1519 – 1524 Resigned)

Cardinal Sigismondo Gonzaga (1524) Administrator

- Antonio Scaglioni (2nd term) (1 Jul 1524 – 19 Dec 1528 Died)

Cardinal Pompeo Colonna, Administrator (1529)

- Fabio Colonna (1532–1554)
- Balduino Balduini (30 Mar 1554 – 18 Apr 1582)
- Georgius Manzolus (16 May 1582 – 3 Mar 1591)
- Pietro Orsini (5 Apr 1591 – 1598)
- Bernardino Morra (9 Oct 1598 – 1605)
- Filippo Spinelli (1605–1616)
- Carlo Carafa (1616–1644)
- Carlo Carafa della Spina (1644–1665 Resigned)
- Paolo Carafa, C.R. (6 Jul 1665 –1686)
- Fortunato Ilario Carafa della Spina (1687–1697)

=== 1700 to 2000 ===
- Cardinal Innico Caracciolo (iuniore) (1697–1730)
- Cardinal Giuseppe Firrao (1730–1734)
- Ercole Michele d'Aragona (27 Sep 1734 – Jul 1735 Died)
- Filippo Niccolò Spinelli (26 Sep 1735 – 20 Jan 1761 Died)
- Giovanbattista Caracciolo, C.R. (16 Feb 1761 – 6 Jan 1765 Died)
- Niccolò Borgia (27 Mar 1765 – 6 Apr 1779 Died)
- Francesco del Tufo, C.R. (12 Jul 1779 – 15 Jun 1803 Died)
- Gennaro Maria Guevara Suardo, O.S.B. (29 Oct 1804 – 3 Aug 1814)
- Agostino Tommasi (6 Apr 1818 – 9 Nov 1821 Died)
- Francesco Saverio Durini, O.S.B. (17 Nov 1823 – 15 Jan 1844 Died)
- Sisto Riario Sforza (1845)
- Antonio Saverio De Luca (24 Nov 1845 –1853)
- Domenico Zelo (23 Mar 1855 – 11 Oct 1885 Died)
- Carlo Caputo (7 Jun 1886 – 19 Apr 1897 Resigned)
- Francesco Vento (19 Apr 1897 – 29 Sep 1910 Died)
- Settimio Caracciolo di Torchiarolo (10 Apr 1911 – 23 Nov 1930 Died)
- Carmine Cesarano, C.SS.R. (16 Dec 1931 – 22 Nov 1935 Died)
- Antonio Teutonico (28 Jul 1936 – 31 Mar 1966 Retired)
- Antonio Cece (31 Mar 1966 – 10 Jun 1980 Died)
- Giovanni Gazza, (1980–1993 Resigned)
- Lorenzo Chiarinelli (27 Mar 1993 –1997)

=== since 2000 ===
- Mario Milano (28 Feb 1998 – 15 Jan 2011 Resigned)
- Angelo Spinillo (15 Jan 2011 – )

== Bibliography ==
=== Reference works ===
- Gams, Pius Bonifatius (1873). Series episcoporum Ecclesiae catholicae: quotquot innotuerunt a beato Petro apostolo. Ratisbon: Typis et Sumptibus Georgii Josephi Manz. p. 855.(Use with caution; obsolete)
- Eubel, Conradus, ed. (1913). Hierarchia catholica (in Latin). Vol. Tomus 1 (second ed.). Münster: Libreria Regensbergiana. (in Latin)
- Eubel, Conradus, ed. (1914). Hierarchia catholica (in Latin). Vol. Tomus 2 (second ed.). Münster: Libreria Regensbergiana.
- Gulik, Guilelmus (1923). Eubel, Conradus (ed.). Hierarchia catholica (in Latin). Vol. Tomus 3 (second ed.). Münster: Libreria Regensbergiana.
- Gauchat, Patritius (Patrice) (1935). Hierarchia catholica. Vol. Tomus IV (1592-1667). Münster: Libraria Regensbergiana.
- Ritzler, Remigius; Sefrin, Pirminus (1952). Hierarchia catholica medii et recentis aevi. Vol. Tomus V (1667-1730). Patavii: Messagero di S. Antonio.
- Ritzler, Remigius; Sefrin, Pirminus (1958). Hierarchia catholica medii et recentis aevi. Vol. Tomus VI (1730-1799). Patavii: Messagero di S. Antonio.
- Ritzler, Remigius; Sefrin, Pirminus (1968). Hierarchia Catholica medii et recentioris aevi (in Latin). Vol. VII (1800–1846). Monasterii: Libreria Regensburgiana.
- Remigius Ritzler; Pirminus Sefrin (1978). Hierarchia catholica Medii et recentioris aevi (in Latin). Vol. VIII (1846–1903). Il Messaggero di S. Antonio.
- Pięta, Zenon (2002). Hierarchia catholica medii et recentioris aevi (in Latin). Vol. IX (1903–1922). Padua: Messagero di San Antonio. ISBN 978-88-250-1000-8.

=== Studies ===
- Amirante, Giosi (1998). Aversa: dalle origini al Settecento (in Italian). Napoli: Edizioni scientifiche italiane. ISBN 978-88-8114-649-9.
- Capasso, Gaetano (1968). Cultura e religiosità ad Aversa nei secoli XVIII-XIX-XX (in Italian). Napoli: Athena mediterranea.
- Cappelletti, Giuseppe (1870). Le chiese d'Italia dalla loro origine sino ai nostri giorni (in Italian). Vol. Tomo vigesimo primo (21). Venezia: G. Antonelli. pp. 434–436.
- Difesa de' canonici diaconi, e suddiaconi della chiesa cattedrale di Aversa, che con sentenza della Curia Arcivescovile aversana emanata al dì 2. aprile 1832 furono assoggettati alle assistenze ai divini ufficj di obbligo degli ebdomadarj della detta chiesa. dalla tipografia di Gabriele Gentile. 1832.
- Kehr, Paul Fridolin (1925). Italia pontificia Vol. VIII (Berlin: Weidmann 1925), pp. 279–296. (in Latin)
- Migliorini, Francesco (1796). Per l'aversano Vescovado contro alla cassinese Badia di S. Lorenzo d'Aversa (in Italian). Napoli: Real Camera di S. Chiara.
- Orabona, Luciano (1994). I Normanni: la Chiesa e la protocontea di Aversa (in Italian). Napoli: Edizioni scientifiche italiane. ISBN 978-88-7104-880-2.
- Parente, Gaetano (1848), "Aversa," in: Vincenzo D'Avino (1848). Cenni storici sulle chiese arcivescovili, vescovili, e prelatizie (nullius) del Regno delle Due Sicilie (in Italian). dalle stampe di Ranucci. pp. 43-51.
- Ughelli, Ferdinando; Coleti, Niccolò (1717). Italia sacra, sive De Episcopis Italiae (in Latin). Vol. Tomus primus (secunda ed.). Venice: apud Sebastianum Coleti. pp. 485–495.
- Vitale, R. (1936). Notizie storiche di Aversa e diocesi. Aversa 1936. (in Italian)
