= Fortunato Ilario Carafa della Spina =

17th-century Catholic cardinal

His Eminence Fortunato Ilario Carafa della Spina
- Cardinal-Priest of Santi Giovanni e Paolo; Bishop of Aversa
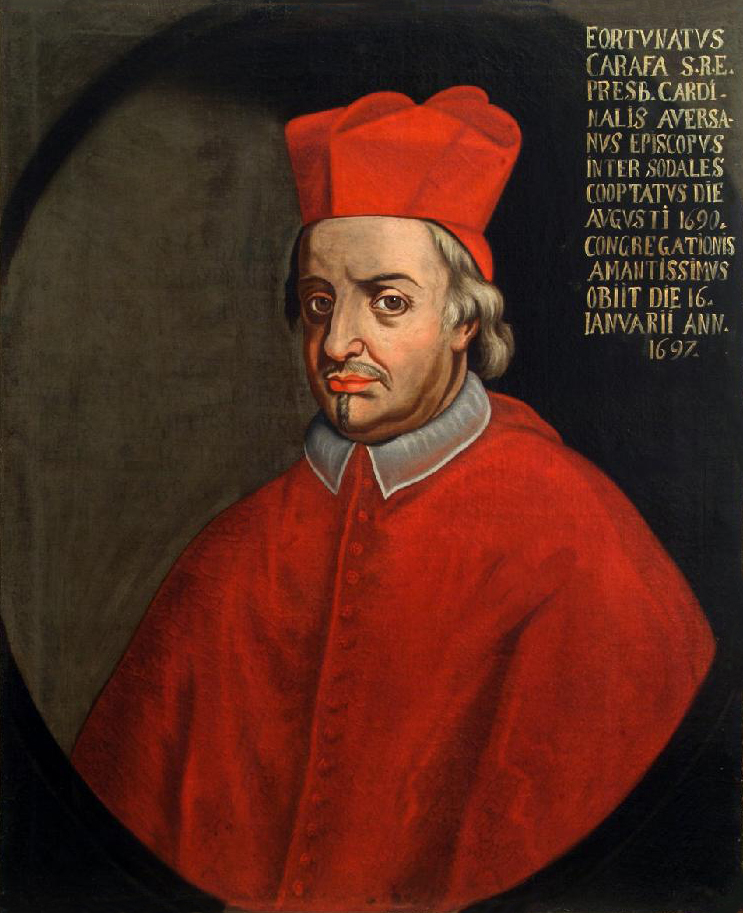
- Church: Catholic Church
- Diocese: Diocese of Aversa
- See: Santi Giovanni e Paolo
- In office: 7 July 1686 – 16 January 1697
- Predecessor: Giacomo Rospigliosi (as Cardinal-Priest); Paolo Carafa (as Bishop)
- Successor: Fabrizio Paolucci (as Cardinal-Priest); Innico Caracciolo the Younger (as Bishop)

Orders
- Consecration: 5 October 1687 by Savo Millini
- Created cardinal: 2 September 1686 by Pope Innocent XI

Personal details
- Born: c. 1630 Naples, Kingdom of Naples, Spanish Empire
- Died: 16 January 1697 (aged 66–67) Portici, Kingdom of Naples, Spanish Empire

Fortunato Ilario Carafa della Spina (1630–1697) was a Roman Catholic cardinal.

== Biography ==
On 5 Oct 1687, he was consecrated bishop by Savo Millini, Bishop of Orvieto, with Francesco Pannocchieschi d'Elci, Archbishop of Pisa, serving as co-consecrator.

Catholic Church titles
Preceded by Paolo Carafa	Bishop of Aversa; 1687–1697	Succeeded by Innico Caracciolo (iuniore)
Preceded by Giacomo Rospigliosi	Cardinal-Priest of Santi Giovanni e Paolo; 1687–1697	Succeeded by Fabrizio Paolucci
