= Fabio Colonna (bishop) =

Roman Catholic patriarch

Most Reverend Fabio Colonna
- Bishop of Aversa and Patriarch of Constantinople
- Church: Catholic Church
- Diocese: Diocese of Aversa
- In office: 1532–1554
- Predecessor: Pompeo Colonna
- Successor: Balduino Balduini
- Previous post: Bishop of Aversa (1532–1554)

Personal details
- Died: 1554 Aversa, Italy

Fabio Colonna (died 1554) was a Roman Catholic prelate who served as Patriarch of Constantinople (1550–1554) and Bishop of Aversa (1532–1554).

== Biography ==
In 1532, Fabio Colonna was appointed by Pope Clement VII as Bishop of Aversa. On 19 Mar 1550, he was appointed by Pope Julius III as Patriarch of Constantinople. He served as Bishop of Aversa and Patriarch of Constantinople until his death in 1554. While bishop, he served as the principal co-consecrator of Durante Duranti, Bishop of Alghero.

== See also ==
- Catholic Church in Italy

== External links and additional sources ==
- Cheney, David M. "Diocese of Aversa". Catholic-Hierarchy.org. (for Chronology of Bishops) ^{[self-published]}
- Chow, Gabriel. "Diocese of Aversa (Italy)". GCatholic.org. (for Chronology of Bishops) ^{[self-published]}
- Cheney, David M. "Constantinople (Titular See)". Catholic-Hierarchy.org. (for Chronology of Bishops) ^{[self-published]}
- Chow, Gabriel. "Titular Patriarchal See of Constantinople (Turkey)". GCatholic.org. (for Chronology of Bishops) ^{[self-published]}

Catholic Church titles
Preceded by Pompeo Colonna	Bishop of Aversa; 1532–1554	Succeeded by Balduino Balduini
Preceded by Ranuccio Farnese	Patriarch of Constantinople; 1550–1554	Succeeded by Ranuccio Farnese
