= Mario Milano (bishop) =

Italian Catholic bishop (1936–2026)

His Excellency, The Most Reverend Mario Milano
- Archbishop-Bishop Emeritus of Aversa
- Diocese: Aversa
- Appointed: 28 February 1998
- Term ended: 15 January 2011
- Predecessor: Lorenzo Chiarinelli
- Successor: Angelo Spinillo
- Previous post: Archbishop of Sant'Angelo dei Lombardi-Conza-Nusco-Bisaccia (1989–1998)

Personal details
- Born: 23 April 1936 Lamezia Terme, Calabria, Kingdom of Italy
- Died: 24 May 2026 (aged 90) Frattamaggiore, Italy
- Denomination: Roman Catholic
- Motto: Latin: Cum Maria Mater Jesu, cum Petro et sub Petro

Styles of Mario Milano
- Reference style: His Excellency; The Most Reverend
- Spoken style: Your Excellency
- Religious style: Archbishop

Ordination history of Mario Milano
History
Episcopal consecration
- Principal consecrator: Pope John Paul II
- Co-consecrators: Giovanni Battista Re, Myroslav Marusyn

Mario Milano (23 April 1936 – 24 May 2026) was an Italian Catholic bishop. He served as Archbishop-Bishop of Aversa, having been granted the personal title of archbishop, and previously served as an Archbishop of Sant'Angelo dei Lombardi-Conza-Nusco-Bisaccia.

== Biography ==
Mario Milano was born on 23 April 1936 in Lamezia Terme, a comune in the Province of Catanzaro and the region of Calabria in Italy. He was ordained a priest on 3 July 1960.

=== Archbishop of Sant'Angelo ===
On 14 December 1989, he was elected the Archbishop of Sant'Angelo dei Lombardi-Conza-Nusco-Bisaccia, and was consecrated a bishop on 6 January 1990 by Pope John Paul II with then-Archbishop Giovanni Battista Re and Archbishop Myroslav Marusyn acting as co-consecrators. As bishop, he took the Latin motto "cum Maria Mater Jesu, cum Petro et sub Petro," which translates as "with Mary, Mother of God, with Peter and beneath Peter." During his reign, numerous churches and other structures in the archdiocese that were damaged by the Irpina earthquake of 1980 were reopened or rebuilt.

=== Bishop of Aversa ===
On 28 February 1998, Milano was transferred to the more populous Diocese of Aversa, where he retained the title of archbishop ad personam. His title, therefore, was Archbishop-Bishop of Aversa. During his tenure, the diocese was plagued by serious crime, and his time was marked by the celebration of a Eucharistic Congress and a diocesan synod.

However, this episcopate in Aversa was not without controversy. The press characterized Milano as "too soft on the Camorra." This was due, especially, to his refusal to initiate the process for the beatification of Giuseppe Diana, a priest of the Diocese of Aversa killed by the Camorra in Casal di Principe in 1994. In 2007, Milano forbade the presentation of The Cost of Memory (Italian: Il costo della memoria), a biography of Diana that criticized the reluctance of the diocese to condemn Camorra killings.

On the day of the inauguration of a pastoral center in San Cipriano d'Aversa dedicated to the entrepreneur Dante Passarelli, who died while on trial for associations with the Camorra, Milano stated "If Passarelli was wrong, we do not care; we must love even more he more errs" (Italian: Se Passarelli ha sbagliato a noi non interessa, noi dobbiamo amare ancor più chi sbaglia), but then requested the removal of the dedication plaque.

In 2008, some commentators condemned Milano's failure to take a public stance on a priest arrested and subsequently sentenced for pedophilia. Similarly, the suppression of pastoral initiatives aimed at homosexuals, parents of the disabled, drug addicts, and young people in crisis provoked some negative comments.

Significant controversy stemmed from the eviction and threatened secularization of several elderly cloistered nuns at the Capuchinesse convent in Aversa ordered by Milano.

On 14 December 2010, a few months before his 75th birthday, Milano announced his resignation as Bishop of Aversa for health reasons, although some press reports attributed his resignation to pressure from the Vatican. On 15 January 2011, Pope Benedict XVI appointed Angelo Spinillo as his successor. Milano, as archbishop emeritus, took up residence in Frattamaggiore in the rectory of the Basilica di San Sossio Levita e Martire.

=== Death ===
Milano died on 24 May 2026, at the age of 90.

Catholic Church titles
| Preceded by Antonio Nuzzi as Archbishop of Conza-Sant'Angelo dei Lombardi-Bisaccia | Archbishop of Sant'Angelo dei Lombardi-Conza-Nusco-Bisaccia; 1989–1998 | Succeeded by Salvatore Nunnari |
| Preceded by Lorenzo Chiarinelli | Archbishop-Bishop of Aversa; 1998–2011 | Succeeded by Angelo Spinillo |
