= Bernardino Morra =

Most Reverend Bernardino Morra
- Bishop of Aversa
- Church: Catholic Church
- Diocese: Diocese of Aversa
- In office: 1598–1605
- Predecessor: Pietro Orsini (bishop)
- Successor: Filippo Spinelli

Orders
- Consecration: 25 October 1598 by Ottavio Bandini

Personal details
- Died: 1605 Aversa, Italy

Bernardino Morra (c. 1549–1605) was a Roman Catholic prelate who served as Bishop of Aversa (1598–1605).

== Biography ==
Morra had been Auditor of Cardinal Carlo Borromeo, Archbishop of Milan (1564–1584), and then his Vicar General.

In 1594, Morra was Apostolic Visitor of S. Lorenzo in Lucina in Rome. In 1595, he was named secretary of the SC of Bishops and Regulars.

On 9 October 1598, Bernardino Morra was appointed Bishop of Aversa by Pope Clement VIII. On 25 October 1598 he was consecrated bishop by Ottavio Bandini, Archbishop of Fermo. At the time of his appointment, Morra was serving as secretary of the Congregation of Bishops and Regulars in the Roman Curia. His duties did not allow him to leave his post, and therefore he sent Father Giovanni Leonardi as his Administrator of the city and diocese of Aversa.

In 1600 and 1601, with the encouragement of Clement VIII, Bishop Morra reformed the cathedral Chapter of Aversa.

He served as Bishop of Aversa until his death on 17 March 1605, at the age of 56.

While bishop, he served as the principal consecrator of Andrea Sorbolonghi, Bishop of Gubbio (1600).

== External links and additional sources ==
Catholic Church titles
Preceded by Pietro Orsini (bishop)	Bishop of Aversa; 1598–1605	Succeeded by Filippo Spinelli
