= Guerricus of Petra =

Catholic bishop of Petra in the 12th century

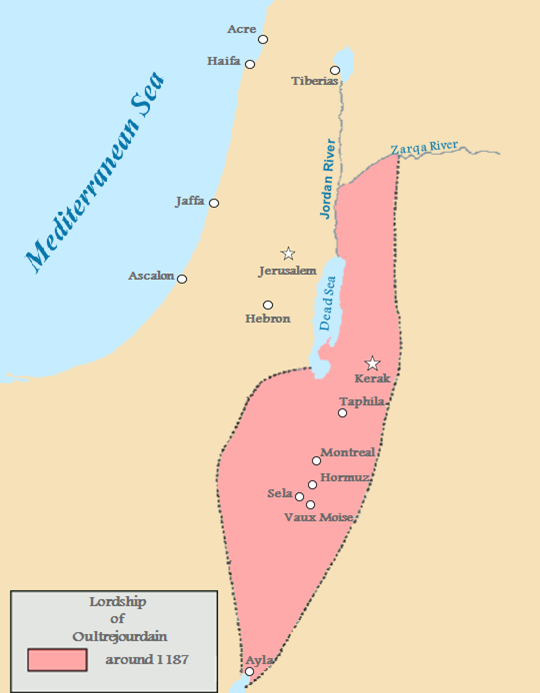
Approximate boundaries of Oultrejordain in 1187; the Archdiocese of Petra's jurisdiction roughly corresponded with secular border

Guerricus (or Guerric) was the metropolitan archbishop of Petra from 1167 or 1168 until his death at the Siege of Acre in 1190 or 1191. He was the only archbishop of Petra from the Crusader period and its only Latin Catholic bishop from the Middle Ages. Politically, his see belonged to the Kingdom of Jerusalem and roughly corresponded geographically to the secular Lordship of Oultrejordain.

According to William of Tyre, who calls him Guerus, prior to 1167 he was an Augustinian canon of the Templum Domini in Jerusalem. When it was decided to restore the ancient diocese of Petra, the choice of bishop fell to Amalric of Nesle, Patriarch of Jerusalem, who appointed Guerricus. Prior to his appointment, he had held no higher rank than that of a canon (priest). According to the 13th-century jurist John of Ibelin, that prior to 1167 there was an archbishop at Babbat que les Grecs apelent Filadelfe (Rabba, which the Greeks call Philadelphia), either Bozrah or Amman, which was transferred in that year to Crac, et est appelé l'arcêveque de la Pierre dou Desert (Kerak, which is called the archbishopric of Petra of the Desert).

The archbishops of Petra had been the metropolitans of the old Roman province of Arabia Petraea, which had been subject to the patriarch of Antioch in antiquity. Thus, Patriarch Aimery requested Guerricus to submit to his authority, but in practice the archbishop of Petra continued to be subject to the patriarch of Jerusalem. Guerricus's pro-cathedral was established in a church of the faubourg of Kerak, and not the chapel of the castle. It was not set up in Petra. In some late documents he is called archiepiscopus de Monte Regali, archbishop of Montréal, which was, along with Kerak, one of the major castles of Oultrejordain. He himself associated his bishopric with a castle, since he had one depicted on his seal along with the legend + PETRAS METROPOLIS ARABIE.

There are references to a Greek Orthodox bishop at Mount Sinai (which the Crusaders called Faraon) under the jurisdiction of Petra during Guerricus's time, but it is doubtful that the archbishop of Petra could have exercised any real authority over the Greek Orthodox church in Sinai, where Crusader control was fleeting. Owing to its status as a newly restored see and a frontier see, the archbishopric of Petra owed neither knight-service nor serjeants for the royal army, an exemption it shared only with the bishopric of Baniyas and the bishopric of Beirut in the Kingdom of Jerusalem.

In documents of 1174 and 1177, Guerricus refers to himself as the first Latin archbishop of Petra. In 1178, he came to an agreement with the Abbey of Saint Mary of the Valley of Jehosaphat whereby the abbey ceded all the tithes and parishes which had administered prior to 1167 to the archbishop save for those of four villages. This was a notably better deal than the bishop of Tiberias arranged with the abbey at the same time. In 1181, Guerricus reached an agreement with the Knights Hospitaller whereby the latter would pay 40 bezants per year to the archdiocese in lieu of paying tithes on their properties in the diocese. They also agreed to pay half-tithes on any properties they acquired in the diocese in the future. The last recorded act signed Guerricus as archbishop is dated to 21 April 1183.

Guerricus was forced to abandon his see by the army of Saladin and, like many of the bishops of the kingdom, joined the army besieging Acre in 1189. According to a contemporary document, he was still alive in late 1190. He is listed among those who died during the siege (that is, before the spring of 1191) by Roger of Howden. No successor was appointed, since the diocese was no long under Crusader control. A titular bishop was in office between 1227 and 1238, but his name is not recorded.

== Sources ==
- Hamilton, Bernard (1980). The Latin Church in the Crusader States: The Secular Church. Variorum.
- Mayer, Hans Eberhard (1990). Die Kreuzfahrerherrschaft Montréal (Šōbak): Jordanien im 12. Jahrhundert. Otto Harrassowitz.
- Milwright, Marcus (2008). The Fortress of the Raven: Karak in the Middle Islamic Period (1100–1650). Brill.
- Richard, Jean (1949). "Évêchés titulaires et missionnaires dans le Provinciale romanae ecclesiae: Résumé du mémoire présenté à l'Académie des Inscriptions". Mélanges d'archéologie et d'histoire. 61: 227–36. doi:10.3406/mefr.1949.8515.
- Richard, Jean (1985). "The Political and Ecclesiastical Organization of the Crusader States". In N. P. Zacour; H. W. Hazard (eds.). A History of the Crusades, Volume V: The Impact of the Crusades on the Near East. University of Wisconsin Press. pp. 193–250.
