= Athenogenes of Petra =

Athenogenes was the bishop of Petra and metropolitan of the province of Palaestina Tertia at the end of the sixth century. He is the last known bishop of Petra before the Muslim conquest of Palestine, when the bishopric fell into abeyance and Petra itself drops out of the historical record.

Athenogenes had a Greek name. He was the son of the holy woman Amma Damiana and one of his grandmothers was named Iannia. John Moschus, a contemporary writing probably after 604, in his Pratum spirituale quotes Damiana referring to her niece as "the most faithful Emperor Maurice's" niece also. Paul Goubert interpreted this passage as saying that Damiana was a sister of Maurice and Athenogenes his nephew. Ernest Honigmann argues that she was more likely a sister-in-law of one of Maurice's siblings, making Athenogenes a cousin of the emperor's niece but not a blood relative of the emperor. If this is correct, he may have been a cousin of Domitian of Melitene.

Moschus refers to Athenogenes with the title abba (abbot). According to Moschus, who derived his report from an old monk named Athanasius, who had visited Athenogenes, there was at that time a stylite in the diocese of Petra who practised an extreme form of asceticism. He did not possess a ladder and did not allow visitors to ascend his pillar. They were required to shout from some distance and only permitted to even approach the base of the pillar to discuss personal matters.

== Bibliography ==
- Blánquez Pérez, Carmen (2014). "Bar Sauma versus Dushara: The Christianisation of Petra and its Surroundings". In Ana de Francisco Heredero; David Hernández de la Fuente; Susana Torres Prieto (eds.). New Perspectives on Late Antiquity in the Eastern Roman Empire. Cambridge Scholars Publishing. pp. 32–47.
- Caldwell, Robert Chrisman (2001). Between State and Steppe: New Evidence for Society in Sixth-century Southern Transjordan (Ph.D. dissertation). University of Michigan. ProQuest 3016813
- Fiema, Zbigniew T. (2001). "Byzantine Petra: A Reassessment". In Thomas S. Burns; John W. Eadie (eds.). Urban Centers and Rural Contexts in Late Antiquity. Michigan State University Press. pp. 111–131.
- Goubert, Paul (1941). "Maurice et l'Arménie: Note sur le lieu d'origine et la famille de l'empereur Maurice (582–602)". Revue des études byzantines (199–200): 383–413.
- Honigmann, Ernest (1953). "Two Metropolitans, Relatives of the Emperor Maurice: Dometianus of Melitene (about 580 – January 12, 602) and Athenogenes of Petra". Patristic Studies. Vatican City: Biblioteca Apostolica Vaticana. pp. 217–225.
- Moschus, Jean (1946). Rouët de Journel, M.-J. (ed.). Le Pré spirituel. Éditions du Cerf.
- Schick, Robert (1995). The Christian Communities of Palestine from Byzantine to Islamic Rule: A Historical and Archaeological Study. Darwin Press.
