= Asterius of Petra =

Saint Asterius

Bishop of Petra
- Died: 365; Petra, Jordan
- Venerated in: Roman Catholic Church
- Canonized: Pre-congregation

Asterius of Petra was a convert from Arianism, and later the Bishop of Petra.

Asterius was one of the defenders of the Council of Nicæa and St. Athanasius. At the Council of Sardica, in 343, Asterius denounced Arianism, as a heresy. This led to his exile in Libya, at the command of Emperor Constantius II.

In 362, he was restored to his position of Bishop of Petra, by Emperor Julian. Asterius attended the Council of Alexandria, where he was chosen as the delegate to carry a letter to the Church of Antioch, where he provided a report of the proceedings at the council for the church leaders of Antioch. He died in Petra in 365.
