= Felice Rospigliosi =

Italian cardinal

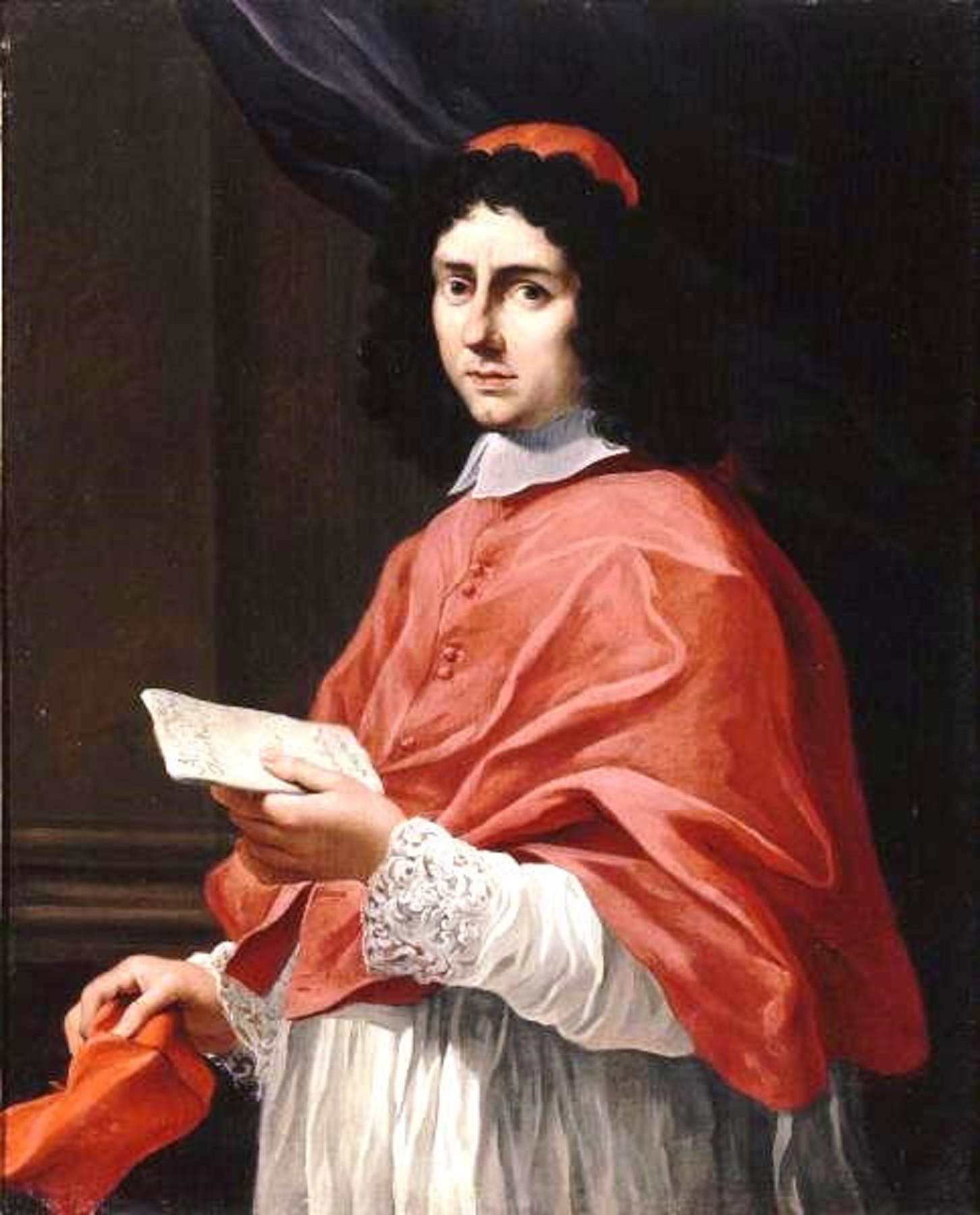
ROSPIGLIOSI FELICE (+1688).jpg

Felice Rospigliosi (1639 – 9 May 1688) was an Italian cardinal.

Born in Pistoia, he was the son of Lucrezia Cellesi and Camillo Rospigliosi and the brother of Giovanni Battista Rospigliosi (husband of princess Maria Camilla Pallavicini), cardinal Giacomo Rospigliosi and Caterina Rospigliosi Banchieri. His paternal uncle was Giulio Rospigliosi, who later became pope Clement IX. Felice was made a cardinal by pope Clement X in his consistory of 16 January 1673. He died in 1688 and was buried in the Basilica di Santa Maria Maggiore in Rome.
