= Pietro Orsini (bishop) =

Italian Roman Catholic bishop (died 1598)

Most Reverend Pietro Orsini
- Bishop of Aversa
- Church: Catholic Church
- Diocese: Diocese of Aversa
- In office: 1591–1598
- Predecessor: Giorgio Manzoli
- Successor: Bernardino Morra
- Previous post: Bishop of Spoleto (1581–1591)

Orders
- Consecration: 17 Apr 1580 by Giulio Antonio Santorio

Personal details
- Died: 1598 Aversa, Kingdom of Naples

Pietro Orsini (died 1598) was a Roman Catholic prelate who served as Bishop of Aversa (1591–1598) and Bishop of Spoleto (1581–1591).

== Biography ==
On 11 Apr 1580, Pietro Orsini was appointed during the papacy of Pope Gregory XIII as Coadjutor Bishop of Spoleto and Titular Bishop of Hippos. On 17 Apr 1580, he was consecrated bishop by Giulio Antonio Santorio, Cardinal-Priest of San Bartolomeo all'Isola, with Paolo Odescalchi, Bishop Emeritus of Penne e Atri, and Ludovico Taverna, Bishop of Lodi, serving as co-consecrators. On 16 May 1581, he succeeded Flavio Orsini as Bishop of Spoleto. On 5 Apr 1591, he was appointed during the papacy of Pope Gregory XIII as Bishop of Aversa, he succeeded Giorgio Manzolo as Bishop of Aversa. He served as Bishop of Aversa until his death in 1598.

== External links and additional sources ==
- Cheney, David M. "Hippos (Titular See)". Catholic-Hierarchy.org. (for Chronology of Bishops) ^{[self-published]}
- Chow, Gabriel. "Titular Episcopal See of Hippo Regius (Algeria)". GCatholic.org. (Chronology of Bishops) ^{[self-published]}
- Cheney, David M. "Archdiocese of Spoleto-Norcia". Catholic-Hierarchy.org. (for Chronology of Bishops) ^{[self-published]}
- Chow, Gabriel. "Archdiocese of Spoleto-Norcia (Italy)". GCatholic.org. (Chronology of Bishops) ^{[self-published]}
- Cheney, David M. "Diocese of Aversa". Catholic-Hierarchy.org. (for Chronology of Bishops) ^{[self-published]}
- Chow, Gabriel. "Diocese of Aversa (Italy)". GCatholic.org. (for Chronology of Bishops) ^{[self-published]}

Catholic Church titles
Preceded by Giovanni Domenico D'Anna	Titular Bishop of Hippos; 1580–1581	Succeeded by Denis Hurault
Preceded by Flavio Orsini	Bishop of Spoleto; 1581–1591	Succeeded by Paolo Sanvitale
Preceded by Giorgio Manzoli	Bishop of Aversa; 1591–1598	Succeeded by Bernardino Morra
