= Fagnano Castello =

- Comune
- Comune di Fagnano Castello
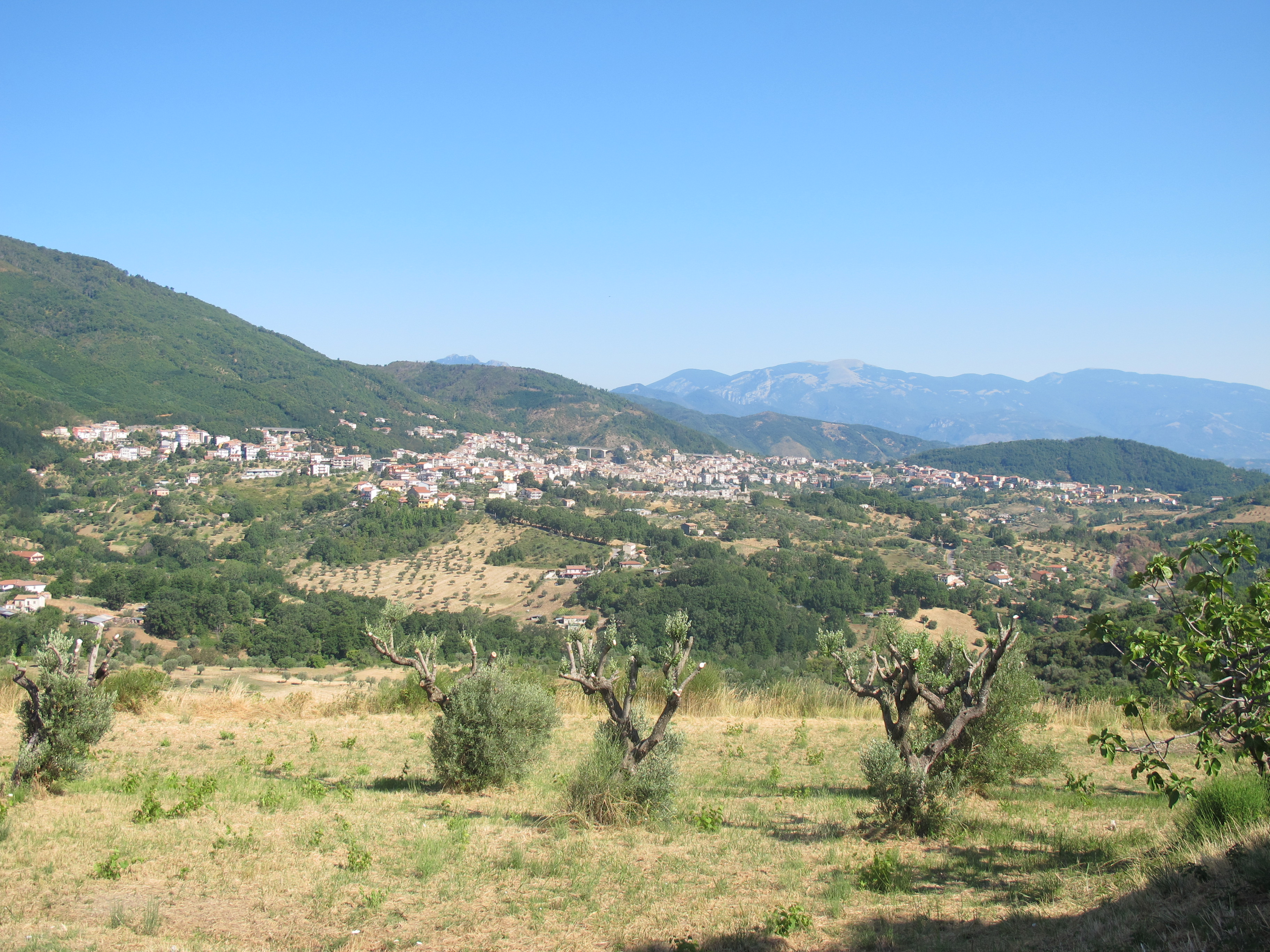
- Panoramic photo of Fagnano Castello

- Location within Italy Location within Calabria
- Coordinates: 39°34′N 16°03′E
- Country: Italy
- Region: Calabria
- Province: Cosenza (CS)
- Frazioni: Cafaro, Carbonaro, Ferraro, Mallamo, Martino, Mirabella, Policarette, Rinacchio, San Lauro, Sant'Angelo

Government
  - Mayor: Raffaele Giglio (Lista civica Fagnano Attiva e Solidale)

Area
  - Total: 29.67 km^{2} (11.46 sq mi)
- Elevation: 516 m (1,693 ft)

Population (31 April 2023)
  - Total: 3,371
  - Density: 113.6/km^{2} (294.3/sq mi)
- Demonym: Fagnanesi
- Time zone: UTC+1 (CET)
  - Summer (DST): UTC+2 (CEST)
- Postal code: 87013
- Dialing code: 0984
- ISTAT code: 078051
- Patron saint: St. Sebastian
- Saint day: January 20
- Website: Official website

Fagnano Castello is a town and comune in the province of Cosenza in the Calabria region of southern Italy. Fagnano Castello is located on Mount Caloria, part of the Coastal mountain range of Calabria, about an hour north of Cosenza.

The town's big annual festival is the Sagra Della Castagna (Festival of Chestnuts), celebrating the annual chestnut harvest around the last week of October with live music, free roasted chestnuts in the village square, and homemade desserts made out of chestnuts.

== Etymology ==
The origin of the name Fagnano Castello is still a source of discussion and various hypotheses have been formulated around it.

An interesting hypothesis was created by Vincenzo Padula, in his work Protogea. He hypothesized that the etymology of Fagnano could be traced back to the Hebrew language and was correlated to the mountain morphology of its territory; for Padula, the "agnano" of Fagnano could be traced back to the Hebrew "hanan", fog, cloud.

The most accepted hypothesis is the one made by Gerhard Rohlfs. A German glottologist, and also a great expert on southern Italy, finds the origin of the name in the Latin expression Fannianum Praedium (property of Fannius).

Another accepted hypothesis considers the origins of the town's name to derive from the beech (Faggio in Italian), which dominates the local flora.

Girolamo Marafioti, a humanist and historian who lived from 1567 to 1626, in Le Croniche et antichità di Calabria (Chronicles and antiquities of Calabria) tells us about a small village near Cidraro (Cetraro), called Castel Fagiano.

Regarding the Castello (castle) of the town (which was probably a tower), it was probably built by the Normans or the Longobards like the ones in the close towns of Malvito and San Marco Argentano. It is not known where the actual tower really is, as the memory of its location was lost in time. There are many locations where it could have been: some remains of a tower can be found in a private property in the frazione of Rinacchio, while another place where the tower might have been is in Via Vittorio Emanuele, where a part of a small medieval wall can be found. Most likely, this tower was still standing after 1861, as the name Castello was added to distinguish Fagnano from other towns of the same name in Italy after the unification of the country.

== History ==
=== Origins ===
There are many theories and legends about the founding of Fagnano Castello. One says that the town was founded by some inhabitants fleeing from the close town of Malvito after killing the Prince whose tyranny they did not accept. But after some studies, conducted by the architect Gennaro Sinimarco who also wrote a book about it: Fagnano Castello History from 989 to 2009, it was found that it is true that some inhabitants of Malvito have escaped from their country, but the Fagnano community had already been present in the area for some time. To confirm the hypothesis, some coins dating back to the Second Punic War were found on which the wording "Fannius et Fili" is "printed".

=== Middle Ages ===
==== Longobard period ====
Under the dominion of the Longobard Kingdom, the Fagnanesi were subjects of the Gastald of Malvito. The people of Fagnano were harassed by the Gastald to whom they owed heavy tributes, which generated some rebellion, but were violently supplanted.

==== Norman period ====
In 1050, with the Norman conquest of southern Italy, Fagnano became part of the County of Apulia and Calabria under the guide of Robert Guiscard. And so a period of discreet peace arrived in Fagnano. In 1096, ten or twelve soldiers from Fagnano followed Bohemond I of Antioch, who was born in the close town of San Marco Argentano, into the first crusade, and probably succumbed during the Siege of Antioch. In 1147, Roger II, king of Sicily, divided Calabria into two Giustizierati and Fagnano became part of the Justiciarate of Calabria Citeriore.

==== Hohenstaufen period ====
Under the rule of Frederick II, exactly in 1214 and 1230, Fagnano Castello was hit by two earthquakes that destroyed it. In the following spring the town was also invaded by locusts. At that time Fagnano was subjected to the authority of the bishop baron of San Marco who also exercised feudal rights over the lands of San Lauro and Ioggi and depended on Ruperto di Tarsia for civil administration. Only with the bull of 10 June 1340 of the pontiff Benedict XII from Avignon, the bishop of San Marco was deprived of feudal rights.

=== Early modern period ===
==== Spanish domination ====
On 6 October 1492, Ferdinand I of Naples granted Fagnano and Ioggi as a fief to Bernardino Sanseverino, Prince of Bisignano. Prince Bernardino I had proceeded with the construction of the feudal palace in Fagnano, currently located in the Piazza Splendore, when Fagnano, full of huts, built with clay and branches, with few modest brick houses began to arise. His heir Pietrantonio Sanseverino, married to Erina Kastriota of Albanian origins, maintained order and defense in his fiefdoms. He also participated, distinguishing himself, in the wars that Spain moved under the emperor Charles V. On 4 March 1525 he sold the fiefdom, for 3000 ducats, with right of withdrawal to Nicolantonio Falangola, Patrician of Sorrento; with Royal Assent of 22 August 1527, the sale became definitive, and with the title of Baron.

Here we find the title of Baron of Fagnano for the first time. In 1543 he was succeeded by his first-born son, Filippantonio Falangola, Baron of Fagnano, and in 1600, Filippantonio's second-born son, Giovan Battista Falangola, inherited the fiefdom. On 19 October 1609—with the approval of the then mayor of Fagnano, Dante Formoso, and the governors Francesco di Donato and Marsilio Giuliano—Giovan Battista raised the rank of Fagnano from casale (what we today consider a frazione) to universitas (what we would consider a town). In 1622, the Falangolas were deprived of the fiefdom as they had sided with the French during the descent of Charles VIII in Italy and with Royal Assent, on 27 November 1622, in order not to lose everything, they were forced to sell it to Cesare Firrao, Prince of Luzzi. The Firrao held Fagnano until the abolition of feudalism in southern Italy by Joseph Bonaparte (1806).

=== Late modern period ===
==== Napoleonic domination ====
Included in the canton of Acri, at the time of the Neapolitan Republic, with the new administrative structure given by the French to the Kingdom of Naples, at the beginning of the 19th century, was included first as a Universitas, in the so-called government of Mottafollone and then among the municipalities of the district of San Marco Argentano.

==== Bourbon rule ====
During the Springtime of Nations, Fagnano and the Kingdom of the Two Sicilies were the site of riots and unrest. A strong libertarian yearning was born among the few cultured bourgeois of the town. The place where spirits were ignited and hopes were cultivated was the Maiarota café, on the corner between the middle street and the small square of San Pietro. Many Fagnanese scholars adhered to the ideas of Mazzini, to the federalism of Cattaneo, to the United States of Europe of Victor Hugo.

==== Italian Unification ====
In 1860, the continental provinces of the Kingdom of the Two Sicilies, already subjected to the Garibaldi's dictatorship, were called to vote on the merger with the constituting Kingdom of Italy. Fagnano voters numbered 827 out of 3,604 inhabitants. Of these, 808 voted YES, with 5 absent and 14 who went to the military camp.

The phenomenon of Post-Unification Italian Brigandage was rampant in northern Calabria. A gang led by Amatuzzo (known as Malerba, literally bad weed) Avolio from Fagnano, allied with the gang of La Valle Francesco from Mongrassano and Iuele Gennaro from Cavallerizzo, terrorized the local population. This gang of 97 affiliates was also associated with the so-called "Saracinari", of Saracena, and with the gang of the infamous Antonio Franco. Precisely for this reason, Camillo Benso Count of Cavour, at the suggestion of Costantino Nigra, commissioned Pietro Fumel to counter brigandage in Calabria. Pietro Fumel, having carte blanche, became the protagonist of many nefarious criminal actions, including the massacre of around one hundred defenseless farmers in Fagnano, carried out by the troops of the Royal Italian Army. Some had their heads cut off, stuck on poles and exhibited in the main square of the municipality as a warning to anyone who wanted to follow their example. The post-unification history merges with that of the rest of the peninsula. At the end of the 1920s, Malvito and Santa Caterina Albanese were annexed to it, which became autonomous again in 1934.

In the 1980s, the provincial road 270 (SP270) was built, more commonly known among the citizens of Fagnano as "La Variante". In 2009 the Fagnano cemetery was hit by a hydrogeological disaster. Among the historical-architectural testimonies include the churches of the Immaculate and of San Pietro, rebuilt in the Baroque age, on previous buildings of worship.

== Main sights ==
=== Religious architecture ===
In Fagnano Castello there are 4 churches, including one located in the frazione of San Lauro.

==== Church of the Immaculate Conception ====
The church of the Immaculate Conception can be considered the mother church of the town. It is located in Piazza Alfonso Splendore, the main square of the town. The history regarding the Mother Church is not very well documented, with legends being present in its origins. The construction works probably started and were completed by the 2nd Baron of Fagnano, Filippo Antonio Falangola (... – 1600). According to tradition, it is said that, in 1551, the people of Fagnano united in the construction of the church to help a poor woman, afflicted by the illness that afflicted her son. According to this story, the mother, sad and desperate, addressed a prayer to Mary with the sincere intention of raising a temple in her name so that her son could be saved. So all the people of Fagnano offered money and resources for the erection of the Temple, and after thirty years the church was completed and inaugurated by the then Bishop of San Marco Argentano Monsignor Giovanni Antonio Grignetta in 1581. In 1939 the young new priest of the town, don Olindo Settimio Tocci, finded the church in such unsafe conditions that it had to be closed to worship, and began the restoration work, bringing the church to its current decorative conditions. The event is commemorated by a plaque, located on the left side of the main entrance, inside.

The façade, in neoclassical style, incorporates the bell tower on the right side; on the same there are six Pilasters in the lower part and four in the upper part ending with capitals in Corinthian style: the work of local artists of the local Barone school. In the upper part there is a single-lancet window with a glass mosaic of the Immaculate Conception. The triple-naved interior is divided by rectangular pillars connected by round arches. The central nave is covered by a barrel vault with frescoes by an anonymous 18th century painter; the lateral ones have a cross vault. The naves end in three circular-shaped apses with dome vault.

==== Church of St. Peter ====
Also located in Piazza Alfonso Splendore, it is believed to have been founded on a probable pre-existing small building. The first stone of the church was laid in 1600, and the entire building was finished in 1610. The church was built and commissioned by Giovan Battista Falangola, baron of Fagnano, Malvito, Ioggi, San Lauro and San Casale. The latter's father, Filippantonio Falangola, who died in 1600, is buried in the church.

The main facade has a portal framed by an elliptical arch surmounted by a rose window, the work of Emilio Fabris, a student of the local Barone school. On the sides of the facade two high pilasters support two frames, one of which has ornamental elements. Above there is the tympanum decorated in relief on which stands the statue of the Archangel Michael, created by Camillo Capolupo of the local Barone school. The church is flanked, on the right side, by a bell tower. The triple-naved interior, rich in baroque stuccos, houses a statue of the Virgin of the Rosary and a wooden pulpit from the late 18th century.

==== Church of the Madonna delle Grazie ====
This modest little church is of very distant and uncertain memory, but without a doubt it is the work of some pious hermit when there was flowering in Calabria of monasticism. The Byzantine monks, including the Basilian monks, seeking refuge from Saracenic raids and persecution, found refuge in areas of the Byzantine Empire that were sparsely populated and far from the coasts, like Mercurion in the territories of Byzantine Italy. So certainly around the year one thousand, one or more Orthodox hermits landed on that solitary hill near Fagnano and built the little church. At the time the Greek Orthodox influence in the Cosentino area was very strong, in Mercurion there was an important eparchy which became the center of irradiation of Greek monasticism in southern Italy. Only with the Norman conquest and the consequent expansion of the Roman rite, did the decline begin which led the Greek rite monasteries to be subjected to Latin abbeys, specifically to the Badia di Cava and the Badia of Santa Maria della Matina, and therefore to the liquidation of the eparchy. Inside there is a plaque written in Latin which tells of its restoration in 1743 by a certain Don Francesco Zumpano.

The church is small, unadorned, with a single nave with a single central altar, a simple facade, surmounted by a bell, is now incorporated into the perimeter of the municipal cemetery while it was once surrounded by greenery.

=== Civil architecture ===
==== Convent of San Sebastiano ====
In 1580, under the barony of Filippantonio Falangola, 5 friars of the third Franciscan order founded a convent on the very large garden of a friar named Crescenzio, who gave it as an inheritance to his brothers with the request to build a Convent on it. It is currently the seat of the town hall.

=== Squares ===
==== Piazza Alfonso Splendore ====
It is the main square of the town, in fact it is simply called "Piazza" (Square in Italian) by the people of Fagnano. The square is named after the doctor and bacteriologist Alfonso Splendore, born in Fagnano, who greatly helped the discovery of toxoplasmosis, making a huge step on the study of human pathology. Overlooking it are the Prince's palace, the Church of the Immaculate Conception and the now closed Barone artistic school. Following the road northwards you descend towards the small square Edoardo Barone and the church of San Pietro. Via Vittorio Emanuele winds from the square and leads to Piazza Aldo Moro, via Giuseppe Garibaldi (called "Timpone" by the people of Fagnano) which leads to the Convent, via Don Giovanni Bosco which leads to the Don Bosco square and via Regina Margherita di Savoia which leads to the beginning of the town. Previously the square was called "Piazza Umberto I"

==== Piazza Aldo Moro ====
Piazza Aldo Moro is located on the bridge over the Cannatello stream, tributary of the Crati river. The square is called by the people of Fagnano "Il Ponte" (the Bridge) and before the 80s the square was officially called "Piazza Ponte". In ancient times the bridge was a simple wooden connection, but around 1600 the bridge was rebuilt in stone, and over time it became a real square.

== Culture ==
=== Education ===
==== Schools ====
In Fagnano Castello there is a single child care, a kindergarten, a primary school, a middle school, a liceo classico and an istituto tecnico.

=== Museums ===
==== Museo della civiltà contadina di Vincenzo de Rose ====
In 2005, thanks to the commitment of the Municipality of Fagnano Castello and the Mountain Community Delle Valli/Media Valle Crati, the “Museum of the peasant civilization of Vincenzo de Rose” was inaugurated, the first museum in Fagnano. In the museum there is an important collection of artefacts, tools and photos attesting to life in the houses, fields, shops and streets of Fagnano Castello until after the Second World War.

=== Language ===
The Fagnano dialect (U' Fagnanisu) is officially part of the Extreme Southern Italian dialects, but it has great influence from the Neapolitan language.

== Anthropic geography ==
=== Fractions ===
In the territory of Fagnano Castello there are 9 frazioni (many of these have most of their history linked to that of Fagnano, except for San Lauro):

San Lauro
San Lauro is a small village, perched on a hill (550 meters above sea level). Its position offers a magnificent panorama, in fact, from the square you can see a suggestive landscape that goes from the Pettoruto mountain, to the Sibari plain and up to the hills of Spezzano Albanese and Mongrassano: on clear days it glimpse two edges of the Ionian Sea. The origins of San Lauro are linked to Byzantine history. At the beginning of the iconoclastic struggle thousands of Basilian monks, fleeing from the East due to the persecution that was afflicting them, dispersed from Salento in the rest of Southern Italy, and some arrived in Calabria. Many of these monks brought the remains and cult of Saint Florus to the Calabrian monasteries, also founding the a commune with the name of this Saint. But some of these brought the remains and the cult of his twin, Saint Laurus. San Lauro had a history similar to that of Fagnano until 1622, the year in which Fagnano fell into the hands of the Firrao. San Lauro "detached" from Fagnano and was rented to Andrea Gonzaga of Calabria Citra for 3 years, to then become the territory of the Sacchini family. We then find San Lauro in the hands of the Rende family, headed by Filippo Rende, who sold San Lauro in 1644 to a certain Antonio Zaccheno. In 1670 San Lauro was bought by Carlo Ardias, a Spanish nobleman, President of the Regia Camera della Sommaria, who was entitled first marquess of San Lauro. The Ardias family had control of the frazione until 1749, when Petronilla Guglielmini Ardias died without children, and the title passed to the Gironda, a family of French origins who arrived in Italy with Charles I of Anjou, who owned the title despite never having lived in San Lauro.

- Cafaro: Located below the municipal cemetery.
- Carbonaro: Located along the State highway 283 of Terme Luigiane in front of Policarette.
- Ferraro: Located in the south of the municipal territory.
- Mallamo: Located along the State road 283 of Terme Luigiane.
- Martino: Located at the extreme south of the municipal territory.
- Mirabella: Located in the north of the municipal territory.
- Policarette: Located along the State road 283 of Terme Luigiane in front of Carbonaro.
- Rinacchio: Located south of the municipal territory, it is the site of the Campo Sproviero, a soccer field owned by the Town Hall.
- Sant'Angelo: A small part of it is located along the State road 283 of Terme Luigiane.
