= Diocese of Teggiano-Policastro =

Roman Catholic diocese in Italy

Coordinates: 40.3833°N 15.5333°E

Diocese of Teggiano-Policastro Dioecesis Dianensis-Policastrensis

Catholic
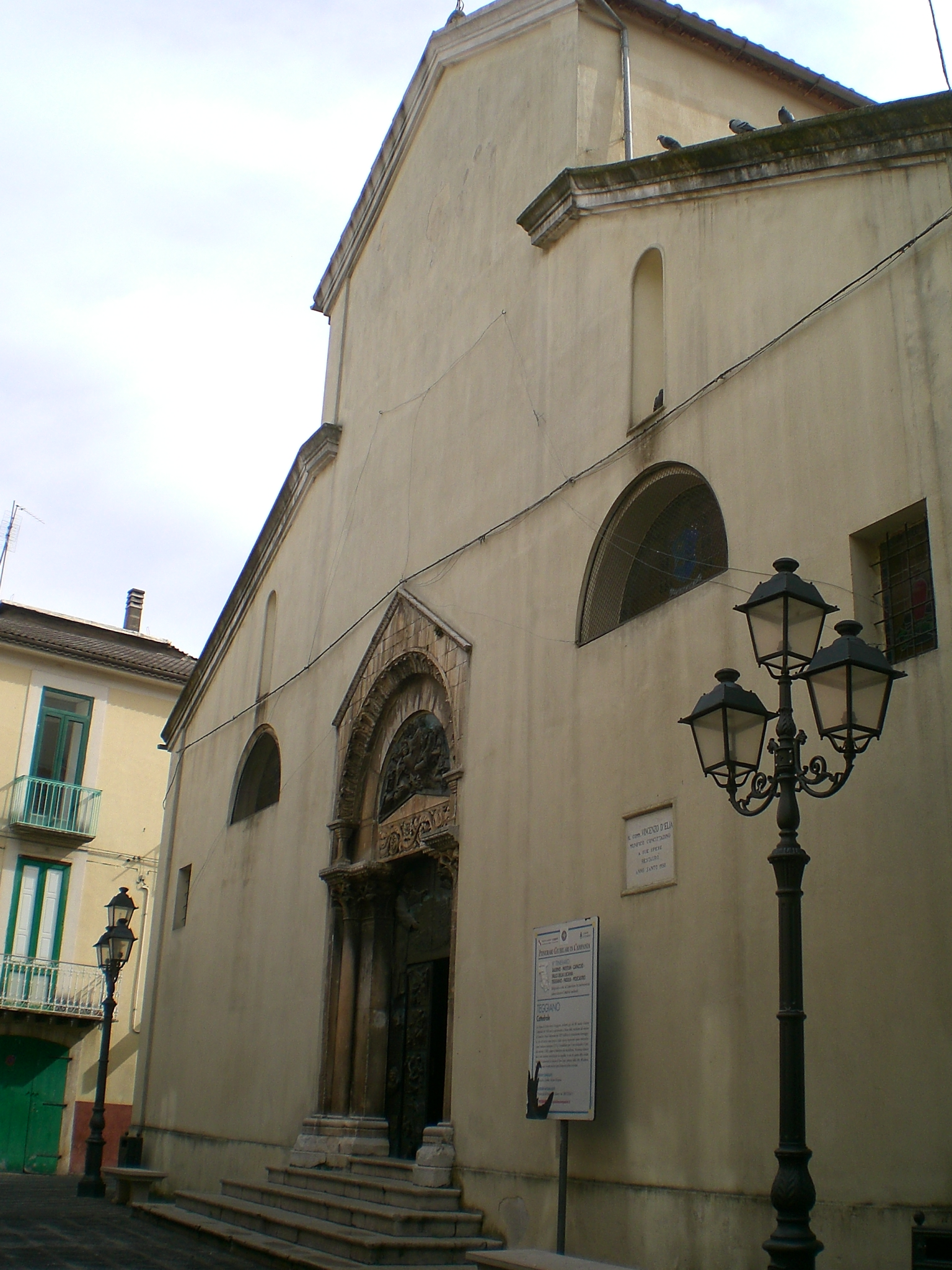
- Teggiano Cathedral

Location
- Country: Italy
- Ecclesiastical province: Salerno-Campagna-Acerno

Statistics
- Area: 1,986 km^{2} (767 sq mi)
- Population: Total; Catholics: (as of 2023); 116,000 (est.) ▼; 115,000 (est.) ▼
- Parishes: 81

Information
- Denomination: Catholic Church
- Rite: Roman Rite
- Established: 21 September 1850
- Cathedral: Cattedrale di S. Maria Maggiore e S. Michele Arcangelo (Teggiano)
- Co-cathedral: Concattedrale di S. Maria Assunta (Policastro Bussentino)
- Secular priests: 72 (diocesan) ▲4 (religious Orders); 6 Permanent Deacons

Current leadership
- Pope: Leo XIV
- Bishop: Antonio De Luca, C.Ss.R.

Website
- www.diocesiteggiano.org

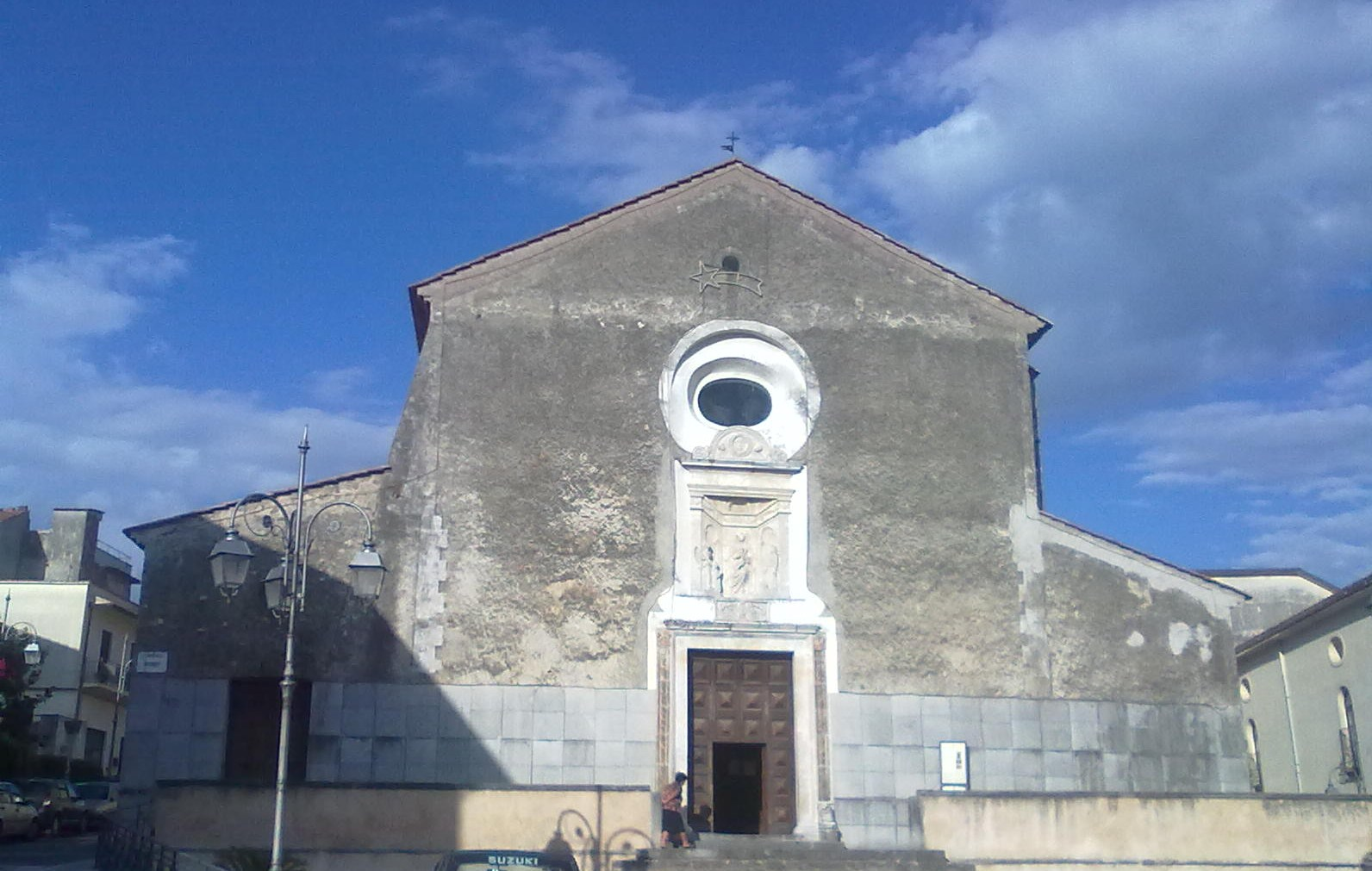
Co-cathedral in Policastro Bussentino

The Diocese of Diano (Teggiano)–Policastro (Latin: Dioecesis Dianensis-Policastrensis), is a Latin Church diocese of the Catholic Church in Campania, has existed since 1850, under its present name since 1986. In that year the Diocese of Diano (Teggiano) was united with the diocese of Policastro.

The diocese is a suffragan of the Archdiocese of Salerno-Campagna-Acerno. Its cathedral is the Cattedrale di S. Maria Maggiore e S. Michele Arcangelo, in Teggiano. The current bishop is Antonio De Luca.

== History ==
The diocese of Capaccio (Caputaquensis), as it had grown over the centuries, had become extremely large in geographical extent, and, as the population grew as well, it became much more difficult to administer. In 1848, the inhabitants numbered some 182,000. Discussions on dividing the diocese had already begun in the reign of Pope Gregory XVI, division of assets and relocation of facilities being of prime consideration. Progress was interrupted by the revolutions of 1848, and the deposition of the pope and creation of the Roman Republic. In addition, Bishop Gregorio Fistilli had resigned on 26 September 1848, leaving the diocese of Capaccio without a bishop from 1848 to 1853.

On 21 September 1850, at the request of Archbishop Marino Paglia of Salerno and of king Ferdinand II of the Two Sicilies, in the bull entitled "Ex quo imperscrutabili", Pope Pius IX established the Diocese of Diano. The seat of the bishop was placed at Diano. To constitute the diocese, twenty-eight territories ("paese") were removed from the diocese of Capaccio, one from the diocese of Salerno, and one from the diocese of Cava. Thenceforth the two sees were to be known as Capaccio and Diano. The metropolitan was the Archdiocese of Salerno, as it had been for the diocese of Capaccio.

It was specified that the King of the Two Sicilies had the right of presentation (nomination) of the bishop of the diocese.

The church of S. Maria Maggiore in Diano was designated the new cathedral of the diocese, and it was appointed a Chapter, consisting of four dignities (the Archdeacon, the Dean, the Archpriest, and the Cantor) and fourteen canons, including a Canon Theologus and a Canon Penitentiarius.

The first bishop of Diano, Valentino Vignone, was nominated by the king on 16 November 1850, and confirmed by Pope Pius IX on 17 February 1851. In 1882, the city of Diano received the name of Teggiano, and the diocese came to be called informally the diocese of Teggiano.

The diocesan seminary of Capaccio had been located in Diano, and it became the seminary of the diocese of Diano. There was also an episcopal palace belonging to the bishop of Capaccio, which now belonged to the bishop of Diano. Appeal had to be made to the King of the Two Sicilies to help pay for the restoration and refurbishing of the two edifices.

The vacancy in the diocese of Capaccio was not filled until 1855. The king nominated Francesco Giampaolo on 6 March 1855, and Pope Pius IX confirmed his appointment on 23 March 1855. The diocese of Capaccio was united with the Diocese of Vallo in 1853, and the bishop now resides in Vallo.

=== Diocesan reorganization ===
The Second Vatican Council (1962–1965), in order to ensure that all Catholics received proper spiritual attention, decreed the reorganization of the diocesan structure of Italy and the consolidation of small and struggling dioceses. It also recommended the abolition of anomalous units such as exempt territorial prelatures.

On 8 September 1976, Diano-Policastro lost territory when Diocese of Tursi-Lagonegro was established.

On 18 February 1984, the Vatican and the Italian State signed a new and revised concordat. Based on the revisions, a set of Normae was issued on 15 November 1984, which was accompanied in the next year, on 3 June 1985, by enabling legislation. According to the agreement, the practice of having one bishop govern two separate dioceses at the same time, aeque personaliter, was abolished. Instead, the Vatican continued consultations which had begun under Pope John XXIII for the merging of small dioceses, especially those with personnel and financial problems, into one combined diocese. On 30 September 1986, Pope John Paul II ordered that the dioceses of Diano (Teggiano) and Policastro be merged into one diocese with one bishop, with the Latin title Dioecesis Dianensis-Policastrensis, or, in Italian Diocesi di Teggiano-Policastro. The seat of the diocese was to be in Teggiano, and the cathedral of Teggiano was to serve as the cathedral of the merged dioceses. The cathedral in Policastro was to become a co-cathedral, and the cathedral Chapters of Policastro was to be a Capitulum Concathedralis. There was to be only one diocesan Tribunal, in Teggiano, and likewise one seminary, one College of Consultors, and one Priests' Council. The territory of the new diocese was to include the territory of the former dioceses of Diano and Policastro.

=== Dioceses of Bussento and Policastro ===
==== Diocese of Bussento ====
The diocese was established before the sixth century as the Diocese of Buxentum. All of the dioceses of Lucania, except Paestum, appear to have been damaged or destroyed by the appearance of the Arian Lombards at the end of the 6th century.

Bishops of Bussento

- Rusticus (attested 501–502)
- Sede vacante (592)
- Sabbazius (attested 649)

===== Titular sees =====
The title of Bishop of Bussento, though not the diocese itself, was restored in 1966 as the Titular bishopric of Buxentum (Latin) / Buxentin(us) (Latin adjective). It is called Capo della Foresta in Italian.

Titular bishops of Buxentum (Capo della Foresta):

- Francisco Cedzich, S.V.D. (1968–1971)
- Desiderio Elso Collino (1972)
- José María Márquez Bernal, C.M.F. (1973–1977)
- Dominic J. Khumalo, O.M.I. (1978–2006)
- Joseph Karikkassery (2006–2010)
- Eugenio Andrés Lira Rugarcía (2011–2016)
- Carlos Tomás Morel Diplán (2016 – ...)

From 1970 to 1972, there existed a duplicated Latin Titular bishopric of Buxentum (Latin):

- Titular Archbishop Miho Pušić (6 June 1970–5 October 1972)

==== Diocese of Policastro ====
On 24 March 1058, Pope Stephen IX issued the bull also called "Officium Sacerdotale", in which he confirmed for the archbishops of Salerno the right of consecrating bishops for (in addition to those named by Pope Leo IX) Malvito, Policastro, Marsico, Martirano, and Caciano. The archbishops, therefore, had the right to consecrate bishops for Policastro by 1058, though there is no indication that they actually did so. The earliest bishop of Policastro of whom evidence survives is Bishop Petrus Pappacarbone (1079–1109), who is said to have been the first bishop of Policastro.

== Bishops ==
=== Diocese of Diano-Teggiano ===
- Valentino Vignone (1851–1857)
- Domenico Fanelli (1858–1883)
- Vincenzo Addessi (1884–1905)
- Camillo Tiberio (1906–1915)
- Oronzo Caldarola (1915–1954)
- Felicissimo Stefano Tinivella, O.F.M. (1955–1961)
- Aldo Forzoni (1961–1970)
- Umberto Luciano Altomare (1970–1986)

=== Diocese of Teggiano–Policastro ===
- Bruno Schettino (1987–1997)
- Francesco Pio Tamburrino, O.S.B. Subl. (1998–1999),
- Angelo Spinillo (2000–2011)
- Antonio Maria De Luca, C.SS.R. (26 November 2011– ...)

== See also ==
- Roman Catholic Diocese of Pesto (Paestum)
- Roman Catholic Diocese of Capaccio
- Roman Catholic Diocese of Vallo della Lucania
- List of Catholic dioceses in Italy

== Bibliography ==
- Eubel, Conradus, ed. (1913). Hierarchia catholica (in Latin). Vol. Tomus 1 (second ed.). Münster: Libreria Regensbergiana. p. 404.
- Eubel, Conradus, ed. (1914). Hierarchia catholica (in Latin). Vol. Tomus 2 (second ed.). Münster: Libreria Regensbergiana. pp. 217–218.
- Eubel, Conradus; Gulik, Guilelmus (1923). Hierarchia catholica (in Latin). Vol. 3 (second ed.). Münster: Libreria Regensbergiana. p. 277.
- Gams, Pius Bonifatius (1873). Series episcoporum Ecclesiae catholicae: quotquot innotuerunt a beato Petro apostolo (in Latin). Ratisbon: Typis et Sumptibus Georgii Josephi Manz. pp. 912–913.
- Gauchat, Patritius (Patrice) (1935). Hierarchia catholica (in Latin). Vol. IV (1592-1667). Münster: Libraria Regensbergiana. pp. 283–284.
- Ritzler, Remigius; Sefrin, Pirminus (1952). Hierarchia catholica medii et recentis aevi (in Latin). Vol. 5 (1667-1730). Patavii: Messagero di S. Antonio. pp. 318–319.
- Ritzler, Remigius; Sefrin, Pirminus (1958). Hierarchia catholica medii et recentis aevi (in Latin). Vol. 6 (1730-1799). Patavii: Messagero di S. Antonio.
- Ritzler, Remigius; Sefrin, Pirminus (1968). Hierarchia Catholica medii et recentioris aevi sive summorum pontificum, S. R. E. cardinalium, ecclesiarum antistitum series... A pontificatu Pii PP. VII (1800) usque ad pontificatum Gregorii PP. XVI (1846) (in Latin). Vol. VII. Monasterii: Libr. Regensburgiana.
- Remigius Ritzler; Pirminus Sefrin (1978). Hierarchia catholica Medii et recentioris aevi... A Pontificatu PII PP. IX (1846) usque ad Pontificatum Leonis PP. XIII (1903) (in Latin). Vol. VIII. Il Messaggero di S. Antonio.
- Pięta, Zenon (2002). Hierarchia catholica medii et recentioris aevi (in Latin). Vol. 9 (1903–1922). Padua: Messagero di San Antonio. ISBN 978-88-250-1000-8.

=== Studies ===
- Cappelletti, Giuseppe (1870). Le chiese d'Italia: dalla loro origine sino ai nostri giorni (in Italian). Vol. vigesimoprimo (21). Venezia: G. Antonelli. pp. 361–362, 367–377.
- D'Avino, Vincenzio (1848). Cenni storici sulle chiese arcivescovili, vescovili, e prelatizie (nullius) del regno delle due Sicilie (in Italian). Naples: dalle stampe di Ranucci. pp. 537–539.
- Ebner, Pietro (1982). Chiesa, baroni e popolo nel Cilento. (in Italian). Vol. I (Roma: Edizioni di storia e letteratura).
- Gaetani, Rocco (1882). "L'antica Bussento, oggi Policastro Bussentino e la sua prima sede episcopale", (in Italian) in: Gli studi in Italia, V (1882), pp. 366–383.
- Kamp, Norbert (1975). Kirche und Monarchie im staufischen Königreich Sizilien: Monarchie. I. Prosopographische Grundlegung, Bistumer und Bistümer und Bischöfe des Konigreichs 1194–1266: 1. Abruzzen und Kampanien, Munich 1973, pp. 470–476. Apulien und Calabrien München: Wilhelm Fink 1975. pp. 486-494.
- Kehr, Paulus Fridolin (1935). Italia pontificia. Regesta pontificum Romanorum. Vol. VIII. (in Latin) Berlin: Weidmann. Pp. 371-372.
- Lanzoni, Francesco (1927). Le diocesi d'Italia dalle origini al principio del secolo VII (an. 604). (in Italian). vol. I, Faenza 1927, p. 323.
- Tancredi, Luigi (1978). "Cronotassi dei vescovi di Policastro," (in Italian), in: Policastro Bussentino. La Buona Stampa, Naples, 1978.
- Tortorella, Antonio (2005). "Breve cronografia ragionata della diocesi di Teggiano-Policastro" (in Italian), Annuario diocesano 2004-2005, pp. 25–32.
- Ughelli, Ferdinando; Coleti, NIccolo (1721). Italia sacra sive De episcopis Italiæ, et insularum adjacentium (in Latin). Vol. Tomus septimus (7). Venice: apud Sebastianum Coleti. pp. 542–560.

=== External links ===
- GCatholic with incumbent bio links
