= Pontifical Theological Seminary of Southern Italy =

Catholic seminary in Naples

The Pontifical Theological Seminary of Southern Italy (Italian: Pontificia facoltà teologica dell'Italia meridionale) is an institution of higher learning in Naples, Italy. It is located prominently on via Petrarca in the Posillipo section of the city. The institute confers higher degrees in ecclesiastical studies on behalf of the Catholic Church.

The school took its present form in 1969 through a fusion of two university religious departments: the Neapolitan Theology Department of the University of Naples (Italian: Facoltà Teologica Napoletana) and the Jesuits' San Luigi Theology College (Italian: Facoltà Teologica San Luigi). Other religious institutions in southern Italy have become affiliated since then, including the Theological Institute of Calabria (Italian: Istituto Teologico Calabro) and the Theological Institute of Puglia (Italian: Istituto Teologico Pugliese).
