= Giuseppe Firrao (seniore) =

18th-century Roman Catholic cardinal

His Eminence Giuseppe Firrao
- Cardinal-Priest of Santa Croce in Gerusalemme
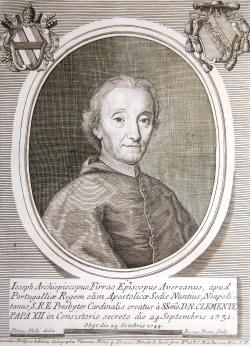
- Church: Catholic Church

Orders
- Consecration: 11 Apr 1717 by Johann Konrad von Reinach-Hirzbach

Personal details
- Born: 12 Jul 1670 Luzzi, Italy
- Died: 24 Oct 1744 (age 74)

Giuseppe Firrao (1670–1744) was a Roman Catholic cardinal.

== Biography ==
He is the Great-uncle of Cardinal Giuseppe Firrao (iuniore). On 11 Apr 1717, he was consecrated bishop by Johann Konrad von Reinach-Hirzbach, Bishop of Basel, with Johann Christoph Haus, Titular Bishop of Domitiopolis, and Konrad Ferdinand Geist von Wildegg, Titular Bishop of Tricale, serving as co-consecrators.

On 4 October 1733, Pope Clement XII appointed Firrao his Secretary of State.

== Episcopal succession ==
While bishop, he was the principal consecrator of:

- Marcello Filomarini, Bishop of Mileto (1734);
- Antonio Manerba, Bishop of Sant'Angelo dei Lombardi e Bisaccia (1735);
- Octavio da Pozzo, Bishop of Catanzaro (1736);
- Antonio Falangola, Bishop of Telese o Cerreto Sannita (1736);
- Troiano Caracciolo del Sole, Bishop of Nola (1738);
- Nicola Antonio Schiaffinati, Bishop of Ischia (1739);
- Ferdinando Mandarini, Bishop of Strongoli (1741); and
- Antonio Zavarroni, Bishop of Tricarico (1741).

== Bibliography ==
- Cardella, Lorenzo (1794). Memorie storiche de' cardinali della Santa Romana Chiesa. Vol.VIII. Rome: Pagliarini, pp. 252–253. (in Italian)
- Pastor, Ludwig (von) (1941). The history of the popes, from the close of the middle ages. Vol. XXXIV (London: Kegan Paul). pp. 37, 181,

334. 338, 385. 386, 390, 403.

- Weber, Christoph (1994). Legati e governatori dello Stato Pontificio : 1550-1809. Roma : Ministero per i beni culturali e ambientali, Ufficio centrale per i beni archivistici, pp. 117, 220, 282, 333, 418, 433 and 673. (in Italian)

Catholic Church titles
Preceded by Ferdinando Nuzzi	Titular Archbishop of Nicaea; 1714–1730	Succeeded by Silvio Valenti Gonzaga
Preceded by Giacomo Caracciolo	Apostolic Nuncio to Switzerland; 1716–1720	Succeeded by Domenico Silvio Passionei
Preceded by Vincenzo Bichi	Apostolic Nuncio to Portugal; 1720–1730	Succeeded by Alessandro Guiccioli (bishop)
Preceded by Innico Caracciolo (iuniore)	Archbishop (Personal Title) of Aversa; 1730–1734	Succeeded by Ercole Michele d'Aragona
Preceded by Innico Caracciolo (iuniore)	Cardinal-Priest of San Tommaso in Parione; 1731–1740	Succeeded by Giovanni Battista Barni
Preceded by Niccolò Maria Lercari	Cardinal Secretary of State; 1733–1740	Succeeded by Silvio Valenti Gonzaga
Preceded by Fabrizio Paolucci	Prefect of the Congregation of Bishops and Regulars; 1738–1744	Succeeded by Raffaele Cosimo de' Girolami
Preceded by Prospero Lorenzo Lambertini	Cardinal-Priest of Santa Croce in Gerusalemme; 1740–1744	Succeeded by Gioacchino Besozzi
