= Beşdəli =

Beşdəli or Beshdali may refer to:

- Beşdəli, Agdash, Azerbaijan
- Beşdəli, Sabirabad, Azerbaijan
- Beşdəli, Zangilan, Azerbaijan
- Beştalı, Neftchala, Azerbaijan
- Beştalı, Salyan, Azerbaijan
