= House of Accolti =

Italian noble family

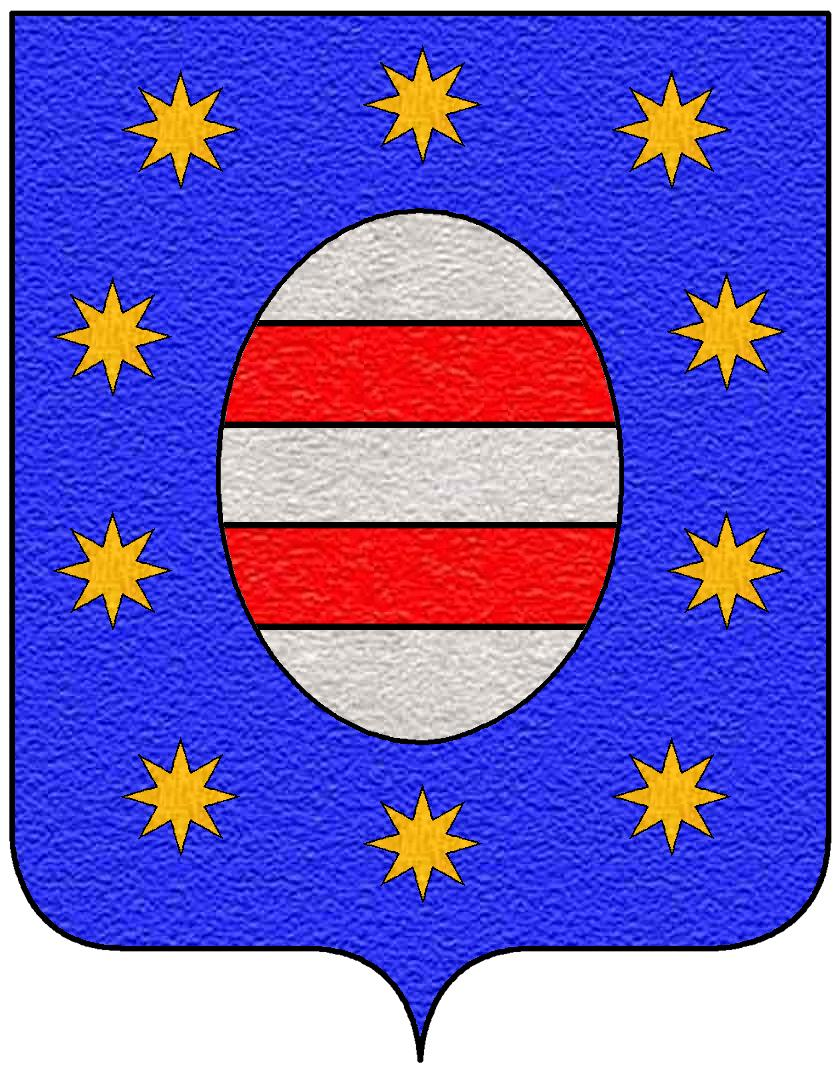
Coat of arms of the Accolti family

The Accolti family is an Italian noble family of Tuscan origin, appearing in Arezzo around 1300. Members of the family held significant ecclesiastical positions, were famous for their learning and became prominent in the 15th and 16th century literature.

== Notable members ==
- Benedetto Accolti the Elder (1415–1466)
- Benedetto Accolti the Younger (1497–1549), Italian cardinal, son of Michele Accolti, nephew of Pietro Accolti
- Francesco Accolti (c. 1416-c. 1488)
- Pietro Accolti (1455–1532)
- Bernardo Accolti (1465-c. 1536)
