= Maharram Dadashev =

Azerbaijani Red Army senior sergeant (1912–1944)

- Məhərrəm Əkbər oğlu Dadaşov
- Born: 15 February 1912; Beştalı, Dzhevatsky Uyezd, Baku Governorate, Russian Empire
- Died: 17 September 1944 (aged 32); Stremț, Alba County, Romania
- Military career
- Allegiance: Soviet Union
- Branch: Red Army
- Service years: 1941–1944
- Rank: Senior Sergeant
- Units: 233rd Tank Brigade, 5th Mechanized Corps
- Conflicts: World War II; Battle of the Caucasus; Korsun-Shevchenkovsky Offensive; Uman-Botosani Offensive; Second Jassy–Kishinev Offensive (DOW)
- Awards: Hero of the Soviet Union; Order of Lenin; Order of the Patriotic War, 2nd class Order of the Red Star

Maharram Akbar oglu Dadashev (Azerbaijani: Məhərrəm Əkbər oğlu Dadaşov; 15 February 1912 – 17 September 1944) was an Azerbaijani Red Army senior sergeant and a posthumous Hero of the Soviet Union. Dadashev was posthumously awarded the title on 24 March 1945 for his actions during the Second Jassy–Kishinev Offensive. Dadashev, a tank driver, reportedly killed eight German soldiers with his tank's machine gun. He was seriously wounded in a subsequent battle and died of his wounds in mid-September 1944.

== Early life ==
Dadashev was born on 15 February 1912 in Beştalı to a peasant family. He received lower secondary education and worked as a kolkhoz tractor driver.

== World War II ==
Dadashev was drafted into the Red Army in 1941. He fought in combat from 1942 and became a tank driver. He fought in the Battle of the Caucasus. Serving in the 233rd Tank Brigade of the 5th Mechanised Corps, he fought in the Korsun-Shevchenkovsky Offensive and Uman–Botoșani Offensive. Dadashev's unit was equipped with the American M4A2 Sherman tank. He joined the Communist Party of the Soviet Union in 1944. In August and September, Dadashev fought in the Second Jassy–Kishinev Offensive.

On 20 August, near Vaslui, Dadashev's tank attacked German positions. The tank's fire reportedly destroyed 6 anti-tank guns and 16 machine gun and mortar emplacements, killing their crews. Dadashev was wounded, but continued to drive. After running out of shells, the tank crew reportedly took shelter around the tank. Dadashev used the machine gun to reportedly kill eight German soldiers. These actions were reported to have caused a German retreat. Dadashev was seriously wounded in his left shoulder on 14 September and died of gas gangrene at the 576th Field Surgical Hospital on 17 September 1944. He was buried in Stremț. On 24 March 1945, he was posthumously awarded the title Hero of the Soviet Union and the Order of Lenin.

== Legacy ==
A bust of Dadashev was built in Salyan. A secondary school in Kür Qaraqaşlı was named for Dadashev.
