= Shëngjin (disambiguation) =

Shëngjin may refer to the following places in Albania:

- Shëngjin, a coastal town in Lezhë municipality, Lezhë County
- Shëngjin, Tirana, a village in the municipality of Shëngjergj, Tirana County
- Shëngjin i Vogël, a village in the municipality of Zall-Bastar, Tirana County
