= Besh =

Besh may refer to:

- Besh, Albania, a village in Tirana County, Albania
- Besh, Iran, a village in Mazandaran Province, Iran
- Besh o droM, Hungarian music group
- Besh-Aryk, village in the Jalal-Abad Province of Kyrgyzstan
- John Besh, the owner and executive chef at Restaurant August in New Orleans, Louisiana
- Ouch noumra, dourd noumra, besh noumra, alti noumra, dance melodies composed in Azerbaijan

== See also ==
- Beshbarmak, main national dish in Kyrgyzstan and Bashkiria
- Beşdəli (disambiguation), multiple places in Azerbaijan
- Beshtau, isolated five-domed igneous mountain near Pyatigorsk in the northern Caucasus
