= Beştalı =

Beştalı or Beshtali may refer to:

- Beştalı, Neftchala, Azerbaijan
- Beştalı, Salyan, Azerbaijan
