= Giovan Battista Foppa =

Most Reverend Giovan Battista Foppa
- Archbishop of Benevento
- Church: Catholic Church
- Archdiocese: Archdiocese of Benevento
- In office: 1643–1673
- Predecessor: Vincenzo Maculani
- Successor: Giuseppe Bologna

Orders
- Consecration: 25 May 1643 by Vincenzo Maculani

Personal details
- Born: 1603 Bergamo, Italy
- Died: 16 Dec 1673 (age 70)

Giovan Battista Foppa, C.R. (1603–1673) was a Roman Catholic prelate who served as Archbishop of Benevento (1643–1673).

== Biography ==
Giovan Battista Foppa was born in Bergamo, Italy in 1603 and ordained a priest in the Congregation of Clerics Regular of the Divine Providence on 14 Sep 1622. On 18 May 1643, he was appointed during the papacy of Pope Urban VIII as Archbishop of Benevento. On 25 May 1643, he was consecrated bishop by Vincenzo Maculani, Cardinal-Priest of San Clemente, with Giovanni Battista Altieri (seniore), Bishop Emeritus of Camerino, and Cesare Facchinetti, Bishop of Senigallia, serving as co-consecrators. He served as Archbishop of Benevento until his death on 16 Dec 1673.

== Episcopal succession ==
While bishop, he was the principal co-consecrator of:

- Antonio Marullo, Archbishop of Manfredonia (1643)
- Franciscus Perrone, Bishop of Caiazzo (1648)
- Francesco Antonio Roberti, Bishop of Alessano (1648)
- Pirro Luigi Castellomata, Bishop of Ascoli Satriano (1648)
- Fabrizio Campana, Archbishop of Conza (1651)
- Theodorus Skuminowicz, Titular Bishop of Gratianopolis and Auxiliary Bishop of Vilnius (1652)
- Filippo Jacobio, Bishop of Policastro (1652)
- Martino Denti de' Cipriani, Bishop of Strongoli (1652)
- Federico Borromeo (iuniore), Titular Patriarch of Alexandria and Apostolic Nuncio to Switzerland (1654)

== External links and additional sources ==
- Cheney, David M. "Archdiocese of Benevento". Catholic-Hierarchy.org. (for Chronology of Bishops) ^{[self-published]}
- Chow, Gabriel. "Archdiocese of Benevento (Italy)". GCatholic.org. (for Chronology of Bishops) ^{[self-published]}

Catholic Church titles
Preceded by Vincenzo Maculani	Archbishop of Benevento; 1643–1673	Succeeded by Giuseppe Bologna
