= Bulçesh =

- Village
- Location within Albania
- Coordinates: 41°26′N 19°53′E
- Country: Albania
- County: Tirana
- Municipality: Tirana
- Administrative unit: Zall-Bastar
- Time zone: UTC+1 (CET)
  - Summer (DST): UTC+2 (CEST)

Bulçesh is a village in the former municipality of Zall-Bastar in Tirana County, Albania. At the 2015 local government reform it became part of the municipality Tirana. Just to the north is Bovilla reservoir.

== Demographic history ==
Bulçesh (Bulshesh) is recorded in the Ottoman defter of 1467 as a settlement in the timar of Vilku in the nahiyah of Benda. The village was relatively small with a total of only four households represented by: Ishri Vuku, Gjon Llapshi, Gjon Kiraj, and Gjergj Shari.
