= Benedetto Accolti the Elder =

Italian jurist, humanist and historian

Benedetto Accolti (1415 in Arezzo – 26 September 1464 in Florence) was an Italian jurist, humanist and historian.

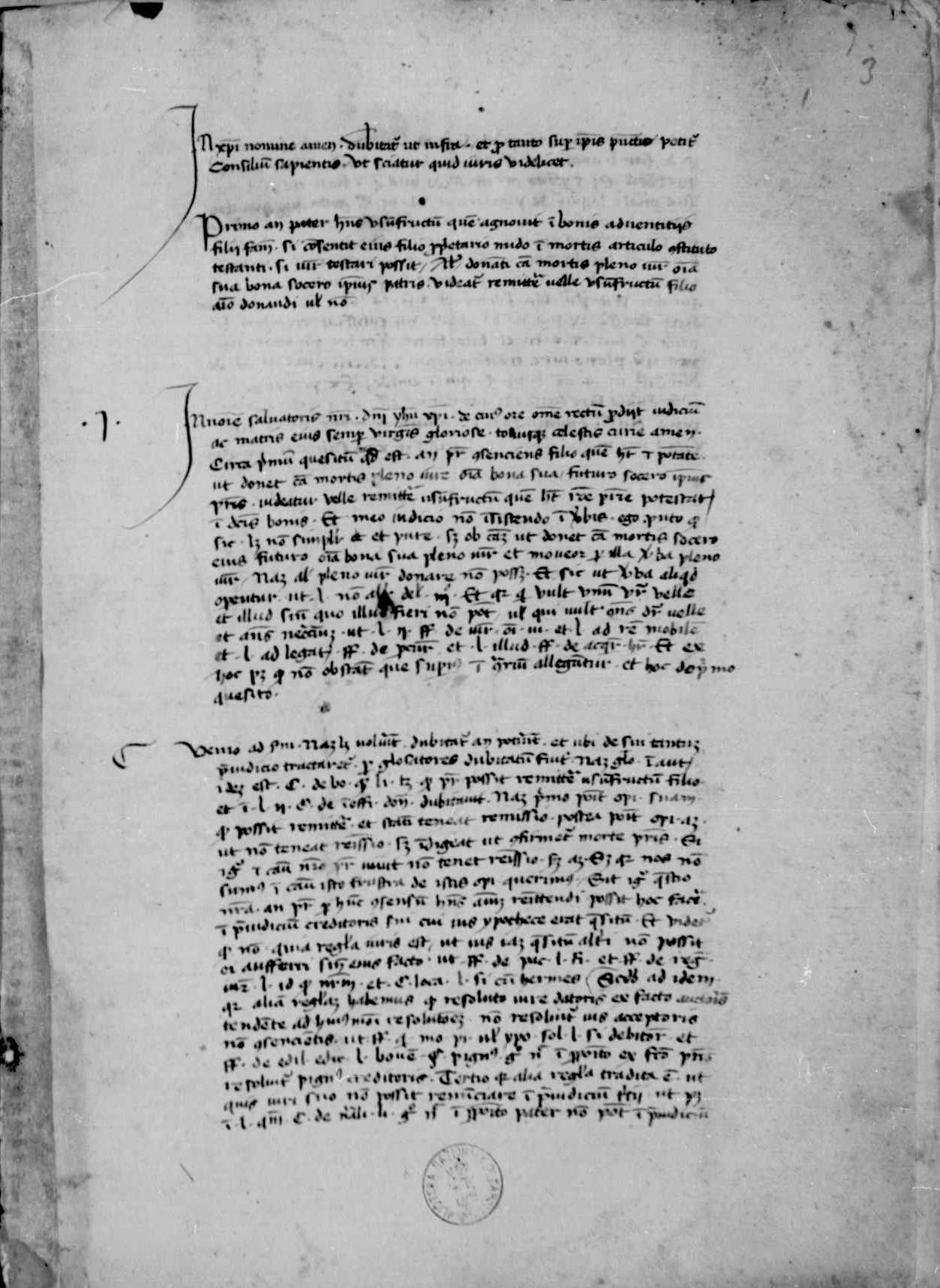
Allegationes et consilia, 14th-15th-century manuscript. Naples, Biblioteca Nazionale Vittorio Emanuele III, Fondo Nazionale, ms. I.D.64. - ff. 327.

He was born at Arezzo in Tuscany, of a prominent family, several members of which were distinguished like himself for their attainments in law. He was for some time professor of law in the University of Florence. After the dismissal of the renowned humanist Poggio Bracciolini for incompetence from the Florentine chancellorship in 1456 and an interregnum of two years, Accolti himself became Chancellor of the Florentine Republic in 1458.

Accolti's memory was prodigious. Having, one day, heard a speech delivered by an ambassador from the king of Hungary to the Florentine government, he afterwards repeated it, word for word.

Accolti wrote in Latin a history of the First Crusade, entitled De Bello a Christianis contra Barbaros gesto pro Christi Sepulchro et Judaea recuperandis libri IV (1464), or "On the War carried on by the Christians against the Barbarians, for the Recovery of Christ's Sepulchre, and of Judea", which is said to have furnished Torquato Tasso with the historical basis for his Jerusalem Delivered. Another work of Accolti's, a "Dialogue" (1461–63), was published at Parma in 1689; in this work, the author compares the achievements of the moderns to the ancients, in order to prove that the former are in no respect inferior to the latter. Both works were dedicated to members of the Medici family, the "Dialogue" to Cosimo "il vecchio", the history to his son Piero.

Accolti's younger brother Francesco was also a distinguished jurist. His son Pietro became a cardinal, while another son Bernardo was a notable vernacular poet. Benedetto Accolti the Younger, the chancellor's grandson, also became a cardinal.

== See also ==
- House of Accolti, other members of the family
