= Pjetër Budi =

Roman Catholic bishop

Monsignor Pjetër Budi
- Vicar general of the Catholic Church of Serbia; Bishop of Diocese of Sapë and Sarda
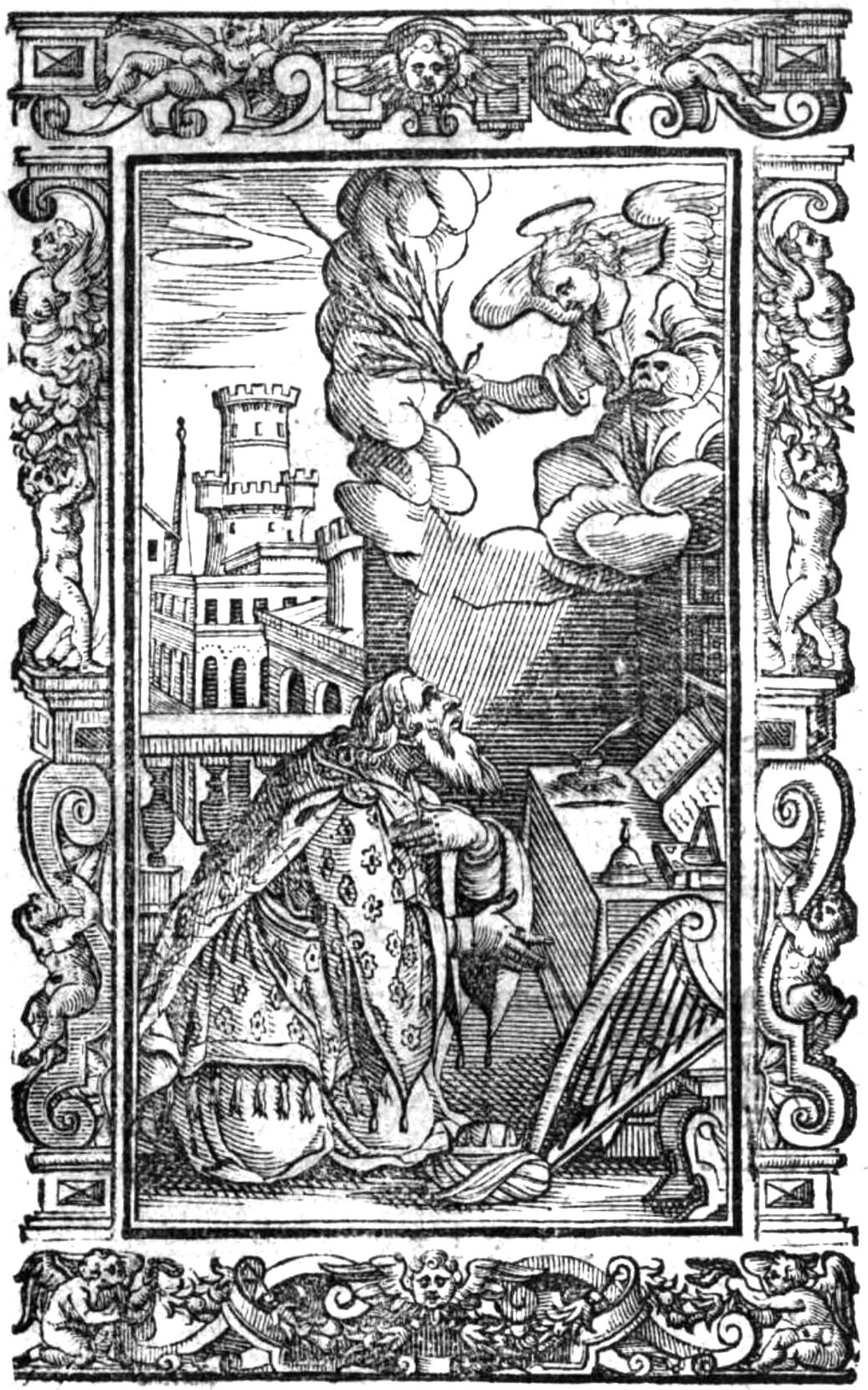
- Sketch of Pjetër Budi from his book Speculum confessionis.
- Church: Latin Church
- Diocese: Diocese of Sapë
- Appointed: Bishop of Sapa and Sarda
- In office: 20 July 1621 – December 1622

Personal details
- Born: 1566 Gur i Bardhë, Ottoman Empire (modern-day Albania)
- Died: December 1622 (aged 55–56)

Pjetër Budi (1566 – December 1622), was an Albanian Catholic bishop and a prominent Old Albanian author from the Renaissance. He is known for his first work "Doktrina e Kërshtenë" (The Christian Doctrine), an Albanian translation of the catechism of Robert Bellarmine, which was published in Rome in 1618. In 1599 Pjetër Budi was appointed Vicar General of the Catholic Church in Serbia, a position he held for seventeen years. Later he was appointed bishop of the Diocese of Sapë and Sarda.

== Life ==
Budi was born in Gur i Bardhë in the Mat region, and is a noted and respected figure in Albanian cultural history. In addition to his political and religious activities, he published four books in Albanian, a rarity at the time, and was the first Albanian writer to publish a substantial amount of poetry in Albanian, some 3,300 lines of it.

He trained for the priesthood at the Illyrian College of Loretto, south of Ancona in Italy, where many Albanians and Dalmatians of renown went to study. At the age of 21, he was ordained as a Catholic priest and was sent immediately to Macedonia and Serbia under the jurisdiction of the archbishop of Antivar, where he served various parishes for an initial 12 years. In 1610, he was referred to as chaplain of Christianity in Skopje and in 1616, as chaplain of Prokupolje. In Kosovo, Budi came into contact with Franciscan Catholics from Bosnia. These connections proved fruitful in later years for his political endeavors to mount support for Albanian resistance to the Ottoman Empire. In 1599, Budi was appointed vicar-general (vicario generale) of Serbia, a post held for 17 years. As a representative of the Catholic Church in the Turkish-occupied Balkans, he lived and worked in what was no doubt a tense of political atmosphere. His ecclesiastical position was in many way only a cover for his political aspirations. In 1616, he traveled to Rome, where he resided until 1618 to oversee the publication of his works. On 20 July 1621, he was made bishop of Sapa and Sarda (i.e. of the Zadrima region of northern Albania), and returned to Albania the following year. On 22 August 1621 he was consecrated bishop by Ottavio Bandini, Cardinal-Bishop of Palestrina, with Luca Alemanni, Bishop Emeritus of Volterra, and Giovanni Antonio Santorio, Bishop of Policastro, serving as co-consecrators.

In December 1622, some time before Christmas he drowned while crossing the Drin River.

Among Budi's other publications are:

- the Rituale Romanum or Rituali Roman (Roman Ritual), a 319-page collection of Latin prayers and sacraments with comments in Albanian
- a short work entitled Cusc zzote mesce keto cafsce i duhete me scerbyem (Whoever says Mass must serve this thing), a 16-page explanation of mass, and
- the Speculum Confessionis or Pasëqyra e t'rrëfyemit (The Mirror of Confession), a 401-page translation or, better, adaptation of the Specchio di Confessione of Emerio de Bonis, described by Budi as "some spiritual discourse most useful for those who understand no other language than their Albanian mother tongue."

Pjetër Budi Street in Tirana has been named in his honour.

== See also ==
- Roman Catholic Archdiocese of Bar
