= Abdi Baleta =

Albanian politician and diplomat (1941–2025)

Abdi Baleta (1941 – 19 September 2025) was an Albanian diplomat, jurist, academic and politician. He was one of the founders of the Democratic Party of the Right and later the leader of the National Revival party (Rimëkëmbja Kombëtare) of Albania.

== Early life and education ==
Baleta was born in the village of Gur i Bardhë in the Mat District in 1941. He studied international relations in Moscow before graduating in law from the University of Tirana in 1964.

== Career ==
=== Diplomatic service ===
Until 1983, Baleta worked in the Albanian diplomatic corps. He served as an employee and later director at the Ministry of Foreign Affairs, and represented Albania as ambassador to the United Nations under Enver Hoxha.

=== Judicial and academic roles ===
From 1983 to 1987, Baleta was president of the District Court in Pogradec. Between 1987 and 1995, he lectured in international law at the Faculty of Law, University of Tirana.

=== Political career ===
Baleta was elected to the Parliament of Albania in 1991 and served until 1996. He was never a member of the Democratic Party but belonged to its parliamentary group.

In the spring of 1994, Baleta, a political maverick who had drifted from the Democratic Party, joined former minister Petrit Kalakulla to establish the right wing Democratic Party of the Right (DPR). The party supported the restoration of land and property to pre-war owners, tougher policies toward former communist officials and secret police, greater compensation for victims of persecution, and a more militant foreign policy backing the aspirations of Albanians in Kosovo, Macedonia, and Çamëria. Baleta parted ways with Kalakulla in early 1995, mainly for personal reasons, and the two became rivals.

Baleta later founded another party, National Revival (Rimëkëmbja Kombëtare).

== Views ==
Baleta was known for his strong nationalist views.

Baleta advocated for Albania to take its place within the broader community of Islamic nations and states. He was described as the political leader maintaining the closest relations with the leaders of official Muslim institutions in Albania, Kosovo, and Macedonia. Although his party, the Democratic Party of the Right, lacked significant political weight, it officially emphasized Albanian nationalism while also promoting Islamic values in politics. Baleta advocated strengthening ties with Muslim-majority countries, particularly Turkey and at times Iran, and was regarded as the most ardent defender of such links and of Islamic institutions against their critics. In a 2021 interview with Anadolu Agency, he characterized Albania–Turkey ties as a strategic partnership that he regarded as "more reliable, stronger and more stable compared to other partners," and argued that such a relationship was "destined ... regardless of which party is in Turkey and Albania."

In an article entitled "Albania: neither an island nor an ammunition dump, but a garden of religious harmony," originally published in his party newspaper E djathta (The Right) and later republished in the journals of the Muslim communities of Albania and Kosovo, Baleta wrote: "Islamization ensued as a natural historical process, with indelible historical, religious and ethnological, but also national consequences for the Albanians. Islam has become an inner characteristic of the psychological formation of Muslim Albanians and of Albanian national identity as a whole."

== Personal life and death ==
Baleta was married to Flutra and had two daughters, Teuta and Lindita. He died on 19 September 2025, at the age of 84.
