= Missanelli =

Missanelli is a surname. Notable people with the surname include:

- Mike Missanelli (born 1955), American radio host
- Niccolò Francesco Missanelli (died 1577), Italian Roman Catholic prelate

== See also ==
- Missanello
