= Bernardo Lauri =

Most Reverend Bernardo Lauri
- Bishop of Policastro
- Church: Catholic Church
- Diocese: Diocese of Policastro
- In office: 1504–1516
- Predecessor: Luigi d'Aragona
- Successor: Giovanni Pirro Scorna

Orders
- Consecration: 2 Feb 1505

Personal details
- Died: 12 March 1516 Policastro, Italy

Bernardo Lauri (died 12 March 1516) was a Roman Catholic prelate who served as Bishop of Policastro (1504–1516).

== Biography ==
On 22 April 1504, Bernardo Lauri was appointed by Pope Julius II as Bishop of Policastro. On 2 February 1505, he was consecrated bishop. He served as Bishop of Policastro until his death on 12 March 1516.

== External links and additional sources ==
- Cheney, David M. "Diocese of Policastro". Catholic-Hierarchy.org. (for Chronology of Bishops) ^{[self-published]}
- Chow, Gabriel. "Diocese of Policastro (Italy)". GCatholic.org. (for Chronology of Bishops) ^{[self-published]}

Catholic Church titles
Preceded by Luigi d'Aragona	Bishop of Policastro; 1504–1516	Succeeded by Giovanni Pirro Scorna
