= Filippo Jacobio =

Most Reverend Filippo Jacobio
- Bishop of Policastro
- Church: Catholic Church
- Diocese: Diocese of Policastro
- In office: 1652–1671
- Predecessor: Pietro Magri (bishop)
- Successor: Vincenzo Maria da Silva

Orders
- Consecration: 29 September 1652 by Marcantonio Franciotti

Personal details
- Died: 6 March 1687 Policastro, Italy

Filippo Jacobio (also Filippo Giacomo) (died 6 March 1687) was a Roman Catholic prelate who served as Bishop of Policastro (1652–1671).

== See also ==
- Catholic Church in Italy

== Biography ==
On 26 August 1652, Filippo Jacobio was appointed by Pope Innocent X as Bishop of Policastro. On 29 September 1652, he was consecrated bishop by Marcantonio Franciotti, Cardinal-Priest of Santa Maria della Pace, with Giovan Battista Foppa, Archbishop of Benevento, and Ranuccio Scotti Douglas, Bishop Emeritus of Borgo San Donnino, serving as co-consecrators. He served as Bishop of Policastro until his resignation on 17 April 1671. He died on 6 March 1687.

== External links and additional sources ==
- Cheney, David M. "Diocese of Policastro". Catholic-Hierarchy.org. (for Chronology of Bishops) ^{[self-published]}
- Chow, Gabriel. "Diocese of Policastro (Italy)". GCatholic.org. (for Chronology of Bishops) ^{[self-published]}

Catholic Church titles
Preceded by Pietro Magri (bishop)	Bishop of Policastro; 1652–1671	Succeeded by Vincenzo Maria da Silva
