= Besh, Albania =

Besh
- Village
- Location within Albania
- Coordinates: 41°25′N 19°55′E
- Country: Albania
- County: Tirana
- Municipality: Tirana
- Administrative unit: Zall-Bastar
- Time zone: UTC+1 (CET)
  - Summer (DST): UTC+2 (CEST)

Besh is a village in the former municipality of Zall-Bastar in Tirana County, Albania. At the 2015 local government reform it became part of the municipality Tirana.

== Demographic history ==
Besh (Bensh) is recorded in the Ottoman defter of 1467 as a village in the timar of Mustafa in the nahiyah of Benda. The settlement was small with only a total of three households represented by: Kal Sundia, Shtjafën Bozhiku, and Martin Franku.
