= Giovanni Pirro Scorna =

Most Reverend Giovanni Pirro Scorna
- Bishop of Policastro
- Church: Catholic Church
- Diocese: Diocese of Policastro
- In office: 1516–1530
- Predecessor: Bernardo Lauri
- Successor: Benedetto de Accolti

Giovanni Pirro Scorna was a Roman Catholic prelate who served as Bishop of Policastro (1516–1530).

== Biography ==
On 19 Aug 1516, Giovanni Pirro Scorna was appointed by Pope Leo X as Bishop of Policastro. He served as Bishop of Policastro until his resignation on 6 Feb 1530.

== External links and additional sources ==
- Cheney, David M. "Diocese of Policastro". Catholic-Hierarchy.org. (for Chronology of Bishops) ^{[self-published]}
- Chow, Gabriel. "Diocese of Policastro (Italy)". GCatholic.org. (for Chronology of Bishops) ^{[self-published]}

Catholic Church titles
Preceded by Bernardo Lauri	Bishop of Policastro; 1516–1530	Succeeded by Benedetto de Accolti
