= Giovanni Antonio Santorio =

Most Reverend Giovanni Antonio Santorio
- Bishop of Policastro
- Church: Catholic Church
- Diocese: Diocese of Policastro
- In office: 1610–1628
- Predecessor: Ilario Cortesi
- Successor: Urbano Felicio

Personal details
- Died: May 1628 Policastro, Italy

Giovanni Antonio Santorio (died May 1628) was a Roman Catholic prelate who served as Bishop of Policastro (1610–1628).

On 26 April 1610, Giovanni Antonio Santorio was appointed by Pope Paul V as Bishop of Policastro. He served as Bishop of Policastro until his death in May 1628. While bishop, he was the principal co-consecrator of Benedikt Orsini, Bishop of Lezhë, and Pietro Budi, Bishop of Sapë.

== External links and additional sources ==
- Cheney, David M. "Diocese of Policastro". Catholic-Hierarchy.org. (for Chronology of Bishops) ^{[self-published]}
- Chow, Gabriel. "Diocese of Policastro (Italy)". GCatholic.org. (for Chronology of Bishops) ^{[self-published]}

Catholic Church titles
Preceded by Ilario Cortesi	Bishop of Policastro; 1610–1628	Succeeded by Urbano Felicio
