= Şorkənd =

- Location within Azerbaijan
- Coordinates: 39°36′27″N 49°00′13″E
- Country: Azerbaijan
- Rayon: Neftchala
- Municipality: Qaraqaşlı
- Time zone: UTC+4 (AZT)
  - Summer (DST): UTC+5 (AZT)

Şorkənd (also, Shorkend) is a village in the Neftchala Rayon of Azerbaijan. The village forms part of the municipality of Qaraqaşlı.
