= Benda, Albania =

Ancient city and former Roman Catholic diocese in Albania

Benda is an Ancient city and former diocese in present Albania, now a Latin Catholic titular see. The present ethnographic region has taken its name from it. In the XVI-XVII centuries, it was composed of the center Moisit and the villages of Shëngjergj, Shënmëri, Shëngjin, Façesh, Mëner, Bruz, Shënpal, Derje, Kumardh, Xibër, Gur i Bardh, Martanesh, Bastar. Nowadays, it incorporates villages like Bastar, Bulçesh, Mëner i Sipërm, Murriza, Vilëza, Zall-Mëner, and Zall-Dajt - Besh, Selita e Malit, Shëngjin.

== History ==
Benda probably was important enough in the Roman province of Epirus Novus to become a suffragan diocese of its capital Dyrrhachium's Metropolitan Archbishopric, although authors like Michel Lequien, in Oriens christianus, doubt its existence in Antiqiuity, given its total absence from the great synods of the first millennium. Michel Antoine Baudrand's Geographia states (quoted by Farlati) «Benda, urbs Macedoniae in Albania regione, episcopalis sub Archiepiscopo Dyrrhachino, nunc in ruinis jacens sub dominio Turcarum; ejus Episcopus commorabutur in castro Mammoli dicte…» (Benda, a city of Macedonia in the region of Albania, bishopric under the archbishopric of Durrës, now lying in ruins under the Turkish dominion; its bishop lodges in the castle called Mamli...), situating it in Roman Macedonia, near Krujë.

Edmund Bohun (1688): Benda, a City of Albania in Macedonia, which, is a Bishop's See, under the Archbishop of Durazzo, [Dyrrachium]. It now lies in ruins, under the Slavery of the Turks, and the Bishop resides at Mamoli, yet from this place the adjacent Country is call'd Benda, under which Title is included also Sermenica, a small district which lies towards Croia, as I have heard (saith M. Baudrand) from the Archbishop of Durazzo.

Maty, in his "Dictionnaire géographique universel" (1750) writes that: The ruins of the ancient city of Benda, Episcopal see and suffragan of Durrës. They are in Greece, in Albania, towards the gulf of the Drin, and the city of Kruja, in a little Quarter, that they still nowadays call La Benda. The bishop of this city makes his residence in the castle of Mamli.

The see is mentioned in historical sources only from the 14th century, but no longer in its own right, only as 'united' with the Diocese of Stephaniaca (in Epirus, suffragan of Dyrrachium) and soon also with some Diocese of Prisca (which Eubel (op. cit., vol. I, p. 463) believes a copyist error; some identify it with Pristina or Prizren, despite suspicious geographical distance, while L. Petit identifies the see with the village Presa or Press in Albania), due to Ottoman Turkish occupations rendering its situation instable, seeing most Catholics flee the region.

The Kanun of Scanderbeg (Alb. Kanuni i Skënderbeut) was adhered to by the Albanians of northern central Albania, primarily in the regions of Benda, but also Dibra, Kruja, Kurbin, and Martanesh, - that is, the territory that was once part of the principality created by Scanderbeg.

A geographical map published in 1689, shows the diocese comprising a mountainous region in central Albania, bounded by the Latin dioceses of Acrida (Ochrid), Krujë and Chunavia.

At least the union with Stephaniacum last till both disappear in the late 17th century, after 1669 when an archbishop of Durrës was given administration of the see of Benda.

Still in 1640, Archbishop of Durrës, Marco Scura, a Franciscan, describes to Propaganda Fide the see of Benda under his administration (quoted by Farlati): its old cathedral in the 'pagus' (district) Moilitus, dedicated to Saint John the Baptist, was ravaged to the ground, the episcopal quarter had no more ministers or faithful; its 20 to 27 parishes, for circa 2.000 Catholic residents, being served by 8 priest.

No residential bishops were recorded.

=== Titular see ===
P. Francesco Marino Canti (created titular Bishop of Benda and Stephaniaca by Pope Martin V on 23 November 1418).

It was nominally restored as a Latin titular bishopric in 1760.

It has had the following incumbents, so far all of the fitting lowest (episcopal) rank :

- Hieronim Wielogłowski (1760.09.22 – 1767.01), as Coadjutor Bishop of Przemyśl (Poland) (1760.09.22 – death 1767.01)
- Władysław Jan Walknowski (1768.12.19 – 1779.12), as Coadjutor Bishop of then bishopric Poznań (Posen, now primatial see of Poland) (1768.12.19 – death 1779.12)
- Józef Wojciech Gadomski (1782.09.23 – 1791.06.23), Coadjutor Bishop of Płock (Poland) (1782.09.23 – death 1791.06.23)
- Antonio de Stefano, Conventual Franciscans (O.F.M. Conv.) (1849.08.28 – death 1893.11.01) as Apostolic Vicar of Moldavia (Romania) (1849.08.28 – retired 1859.11.27)
- Francesco Uccellini (1894.05.18 – 1895.05.18), later Bishop of Roman Catholic Diocese of Kotor (Cattaro, Montenegro) (1895.05.18 – death 1937.06.04)
- Jean-Marie Dépierre, Paris Foreign Missions Society (M.E.P.) (1895.04.12 – death 1898.10.17) as Apostolic Vicar of Western Cochin (Vietnam) (1895.04.12 – 1898.10.17)
- Paolo Schirò (1904.01.26 – death 1941.09.12), as Eastern Catholic Ordinary of Sicilia of the Italo-Albanese (Byzantine rite; southern Italy) (1904.01.26 – retired 1937.10.26)
- Maurice-Bernard-Benoit-Joseph Despatures, M.E.P. (1942.09.06 – 1963.08.26), as emeritate; former bishop of Mysore (India) (1922.06.21 – 1940.02.13) and Bishop of Bangalore (India) (1940.02.13 – 1942.09.06)
- James Edward McManus, Redemptorists (C.SS.R.) (1963.11.18 – death 1976.07.03) as Auxiliary Bishop of New York (NY, USA) (1963.11.18 – 1970) and on emeritate; previously Bishop of Ponce (Puerto Rico, US Antilles) (1947.05.10 – resigned 1963.11.18)
- Georges Edmond Robert Gilson (1976.07.13 – 1981.08.13), as Auxiliary Bishop of Paris (France) (1976.07.13 – 1981.08.13); later Bishop of Le Mans (France) (1981.08.13 – 1996.08.02), Metropolitan Archbishop of Sens (France) (1996.08.02 – 2002.12.08), also Bishop-Prelate of the Territorial Prelature of Mission de France (France) (1996.08.02 – 2004.12.31), later demoted non-Metropolitan Archbishop of above Sens (2002.12.08 – 2004.12.31)
- Johannes Bernardus Niënhaus (1982.01.15 – death 2000.12.05) as Auxiliary Bishop of Utrecht (Netherlands) (1982.01.15 – retired 1999.09.01) and on emeritate
- Tomasz Peta (2001.02.15 – 2003.05.17) as first Apostolic Administrator of Astana (Kazakhstan) (1999.07.07 – 2003.05.17); later promoted as that renamed see's first Metropolitan Archbishop of Astana (2003.05.17 – ...), also President of Episcopal Conference of Kazakhstan (2003.05 – ...)
- Vasyl Ivasyuk (2003.07.28 – 2014.02.13), as Archiepiscopal Exarch of Odessa-Krym of the Ukrainians (Ukraine) (2003.07.28 – 2014.02.13) and as Patriarchal Administrator of Kolomyia–Chernivtsi of the Ukrainians (Ukraine) (2013.05.22 – 2014.02.13); next Eparch (Bishop) of above Kolomyia–Chernivtsi of the Ukrainians (2014.02.13 – ...)
- Wilhelm Zimmermann (2014.03.14 – ...), Auxiliary Bishop of Essen (Germany), no previous prelature

== See also ==
- List of Catholic dioceses in Albania
- Catholic Church in Albania

== Sources and external links ==
- GigaCatholic, with titular incumbent biography links

Bibliography

- Pius Bonifacius Gams, Series episcoporum Ecclesiae Catholicae, Leipzig 1931, p. 422
- Daniele Farlati-Jacopo Coleti, Illyricum Sacrum, vol. VII, Venice 1817, pp. 401–405
- Konrad Eubel, Hierarchia Catholica Medii Aevi, vol. 6, p. 120
- Louis Petit, lemma 'Benda' in Catholic Encyclopedia, vol. II, New York 1907
- L. Jadin, lemma 'Benda' in Dictionnaire d'Histoire et de Géographie ecclésiastiques, vol. VII, 1934, coll. 1051-1052
