= Zall-Dajt =

- Village
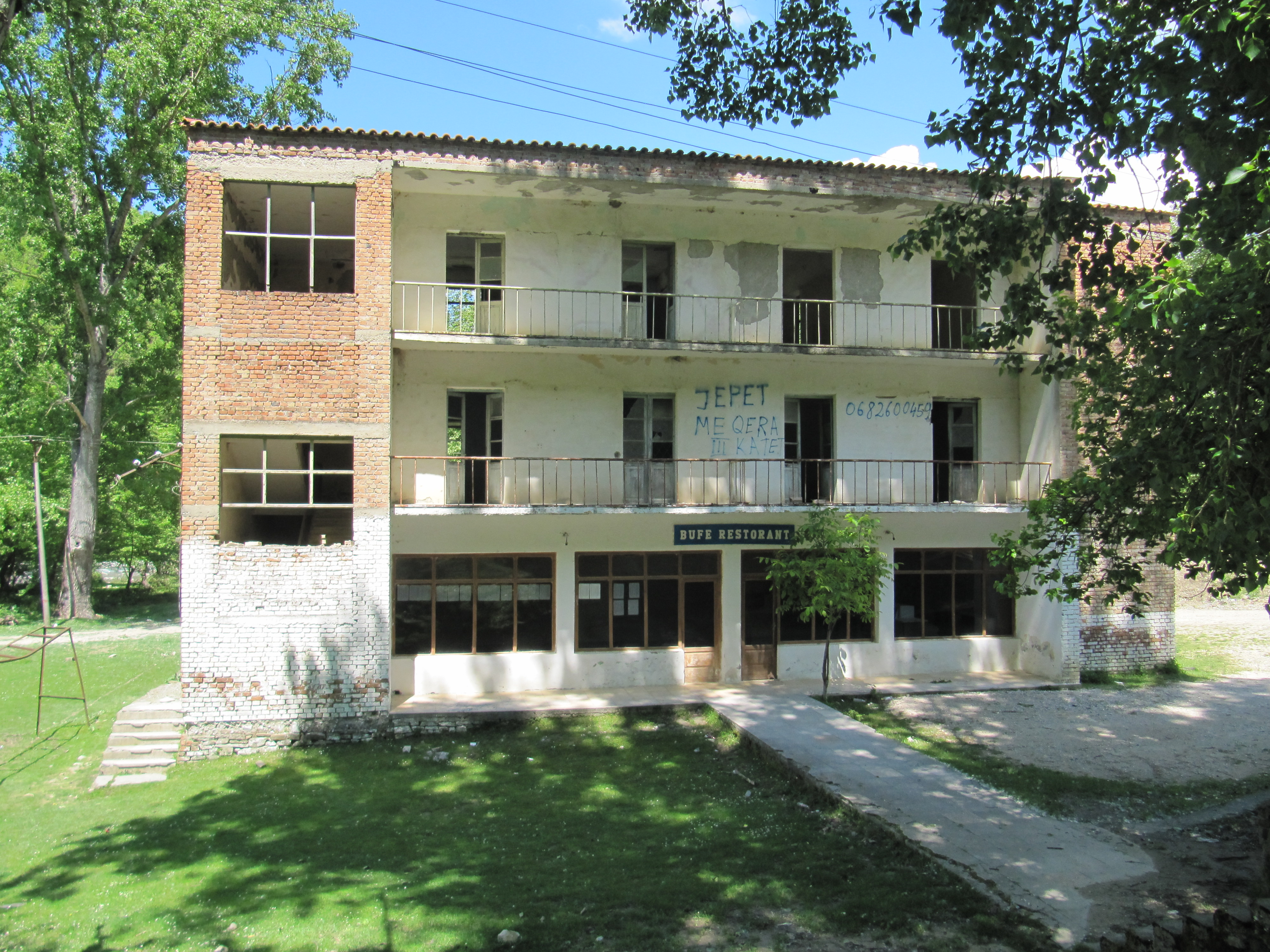

- Location within Albania
- Coordinates: 41°24′N 19°56′E
- Country: Albania
- County: Tirana
- Municipality: Tirana
- Administrative unit: Zall-Bastar
- Time zone: UTC+1 (CET)
  - Summer (DST): UTC+2 (CEST)

Zall-Dajt is a village in the former municipality of Zall-Bastar in Tirana County, Albania. At the 2015 local government reform it became part of the municipality Tirana.
