= Tommaso de Rosa =

Italian Roman Catholic prelate

Most Reverend Tommaso de Rosa
- Bishop of Policastro
- Church: Catholic Church
- Diocese: Diocese of Policastro
- In office: 1679-1695
- Predecessor: Vincenzo Maria da Silva
- Successor: Giacinto Camillo Maradei
- Previous post: Bishop of Sant'Angelo dei Lombardi e Bisaccia (1662–1679)

Orders
- Ordination: by Giulio Cesare Sacchetti
- Consecration: 22 January 1662 by Giulio Cesare Sacchetti

Personal details
- Born: 1621 Cava, Italy
- Died: 10 October 1695 (age 74) Policastro, Italy

Tommaso de Rosa (1621 – 10 October 1695) was a Roman Catholic prelate who served as Bishop of Policastro (1695–1679) and Bishop of Sant'Angelo dei Lombardi e Bisaccia (1662–1679).

== Biography ==
Tommaso de Rosa was born in Cava, Italy in 1621. On 16 January 1662, he was appointed during the papacy of Pope Alexander VII as Bishop of Sant'Angelo dei Lombardi e Bisaccia. On 22 January 1662, he was consecrated bishop by Giulio Cesare Sacchetti, Cardinal-Bishop of Sabina, with Ottaviano Carafa, Titular Archbishop of Patrae, and Carlo de' Vecchi, Bishop Emeritus of Chiusi, serving as co-consecrators. On 8 May 1679, he was appointed during the papacy of Pope Innocent XI as Bishop of Policastro. He served as Bishop of Policastro until his death on 10 October 1695.

== External links and additional sources ==
- Cheney, David M. "Diocese of Sant'Angelo dei Lombardi e Bisaccia". Catholic-Hierarchy.org. (for Chronology of Bishops) ^{[self-published]}
- Chow, Gabriel. "Archdiocese of Sant'Angelo dei Lombardi–Conza–Nusco–Bisaccia". GCatholic.org. (for Chronology of Bishops) ^{[self-published]}

Catholic Church titles
Preceded by Ignazio Ciantes	Bishop of Sant'Angelo dei Lombardi e Bisaccia; 1662–1679	Succeeded by Giovanni Battista Nepita
Preceded by Vincenzo Maria da Silva	Bishop of Policastro; 1695–1679	Succeeded by Giacinto Camillo Maradei
