= Qaraqaşlı, Neftchala =

Municipality in Azerbaijan

Coordinates: 39.58663°N 48.99216°E

Qaraqaşlı is a village and municipality in the Neftchala Rayon of Azerbaijan. It has a population of 2,469. The municipality consists of the villages of Qaraqaşlı, Beştalı, and Şorkənd.

== Notable natives ==
- Khanoglan Mammadov — National Hero of Azerbaijan.
