= Giacinto Camillo Maradei =

Former Bishop of Policastro

Most Reverend Giacinto Camillo Maradei
- Bishop of Policastro
- Church: Catholic Church
- Diocese: Diocese of Policastro
- In office: 1696–1705
- Predecessor: Tommaso de Rosa
- Successor: Marco Antonio de Rosa

Orders
- Ordination: 25 February 1668
- Consecration: 8 April 1696 by Ferdinando d'Adda

Personal details
- Born: 1 March 1636 Laino Castello, Kingdom of Naples
- Died: 2 September 1705 (age 69) Policastro, Kingdom of Naples

Giacinto Camillo Maradei (1 March 1636 – 2 September 1705) was a Roman Catholic prelate who served as Bishop of Policastro (1696–1705).

== Biography ==
Maradei was born in Laino Castello, Italy on 1 March 1636 and ordained a priest on 25 February 1668. On 2 April 1696, he was appointed by Pope Innocent XII as Bishop of Policastro. On 8 April 1696, he was consecrated bishop by Ferdinando d'Adda, Cardinal-Priest of Santa Balbina, with Carlo Loffredo, Archbishop of Bari (-Canosa), and Domenico Diez de Aux, Bishop of Gerace, serving as co-consecrators. He served as Bishop of Policastro until his death on 2 September 1705. While bishop, he was the principal co-consecrator of Emanuele Cicatelli, Bishop of Avellino e Frigento (1700), and Nicolò Cervini, Bishop of Lavello (1700).

Catholic Church titles
Preceded by Tommaso de Rosa	Bishop of Policastro; 1696–1705	Succeeded by Marco Antonio de Rosa
