= Francesco Accolti =

Italian jurist

Francesco Accolti (c. 1416 – 1488), also called Francesco d'Arezzo, was an Italian jurist. The brother of Benedetto Accolti, he professed jurisprudence at Bologna from 1440 to 1445, and afterwards at Ferrara, Siena, and Pisa.

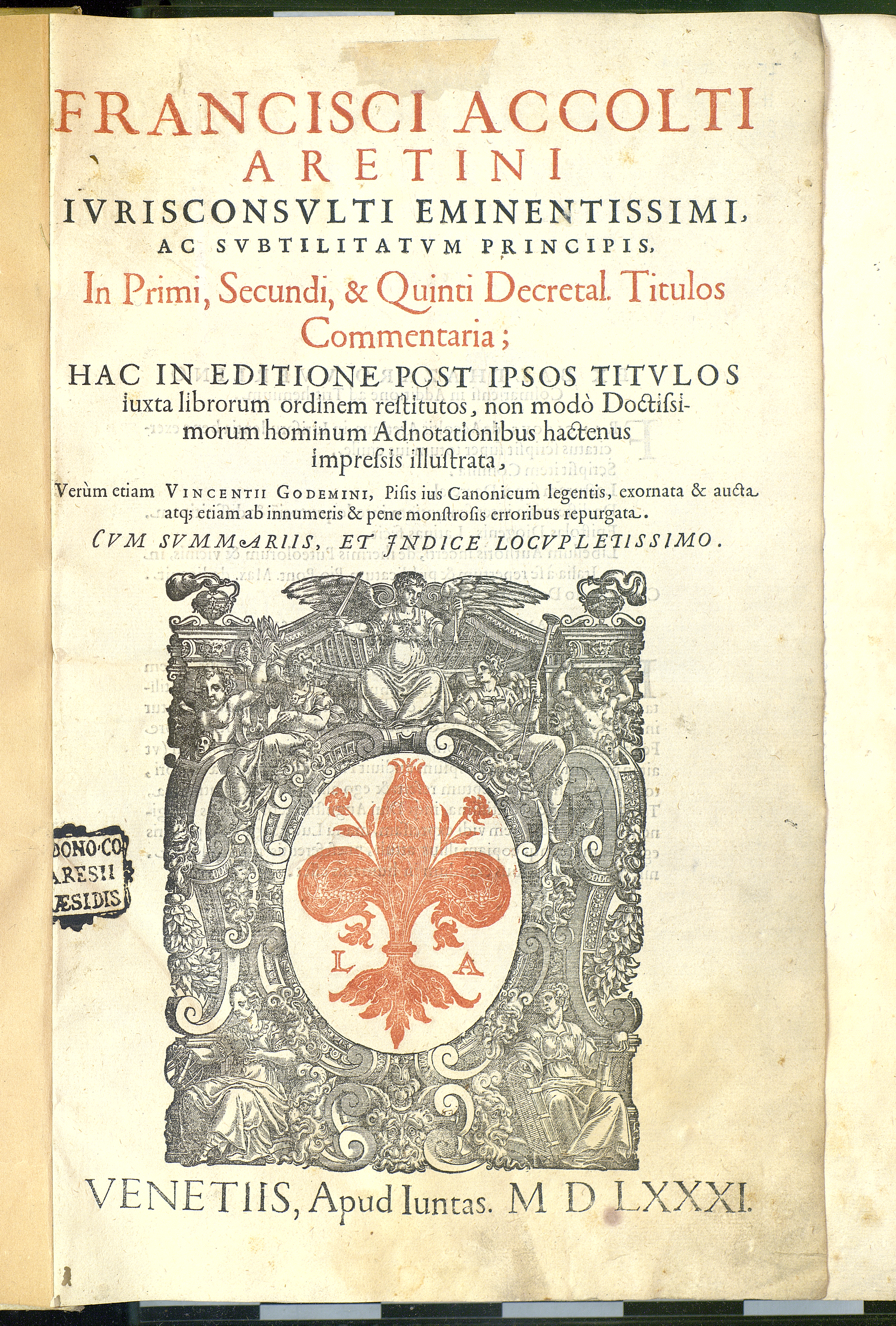
In primi, secundi et quinti Decretalium titulos commentaria, 1581

He possessed a strong understanding and powerful eloquence. The distinction which he acquired was so great, that he flattered himself with the expectation of obtaining a cardinal's hat, on the accession of Sixtus IV to the pontifical throne; and when it was refused him, the pope thought it necessary to accompany the refusal with this complimentary apology: "I would gladly have granted you the honor, had I not feared, that your preferment, by removing you from your school, would have hindered the progress of science." The reputation of Accolti was tarnished by the parsimony with which he amassed vast treasures. He wrote several treatises on law, and translated some of the writings of Chrysostom.

== Biography ==
In Siena, from 1434 to 1438, he was a disciple of the humanist and writer Francesco Filelfo.

He taught jurisprudence in Bologna from 1440 to 1445, in Ferrara, where he was counselor to Borso d'Este, in Siena, in Milan, where he served as secretary to Francesco I Sforza, and from 1479 to 1484 in Pisa. Besides being a renowned jurist, he also carried out various diplomatic missions.

His works include Consilia seu Responsa iuris (1482) and Repetitiones (1494), as well as various commentaries on the Decretal.

== See also ==
- Accolti, other members of the family
