= Shëngjin i Vogël =

- Village
- Location within Albania
- Coordinates: 41°22′N 19°57′E
- Country: Albania
- County: Tirana
- Municipality: Tirana
- Administrative unit: Zall-Bastar
- Time zone: UTC+1 (CET)
  - Summer (DST): UTC+2 (CEST)

Shëngjin i Vogël is a village in the former municipality of Zall-Bastar in Tirana County, Albania. At the 2015 local government reform it became part of the municipality Tirana.

== Demographic History ==
Shëngjin i Vogël (Shëngjin) is recorded in the Ottoman defter of 1467 as a settlement in the nahiyah of Benda. The village had a total of five households represented by the following household heads: Nikolla Çuroji, Tat Gjika, Vlash Bardi, Martin Rakizi, and Dimitri Çuroji.
