= Pietro Magri (bishop) =

Most Reverend Pietro Magri
- Bishop of Policastro
- Church: Catholic Church
- Diocese: Diocese of Policastro
- In office: 1635–1651
- Predecessor: Urbano Felicio
- Successor: Filippo Jacobio

Orders
- Consecration: 7 October 1635 by Francesco Maria Brancaccio

Personal details
- Died: October 1651 Policastro, Italy

Pietro Magri (died October 1651) was a Roman Catholic prelate who served as Bishop of Policastro (1635–1651).

On 1 October 1635, Pietro Magri was appointed by Pope Urban VIII as Bishop of Policastro. On 7 October 1635, he was consecrated bishop by Francesco Maria Brancaccio, Cardinal-Priest of Santi XII Apostoli, with Giovanni Battista Altieri, Bishop Emeritus of Camerino, and Sigismondo Taddei, Bishop of Bitetto, serving as co-consecrators. He served as Bishop of Policastro until his death in October 1651.

== External links and additional sources ==
- Cheney, David M. "Diocese of Policastro". Catholic-Hierarchy.org. (for Chronology of Bishops) ^{[self-published]}
- Chow, Gabriel. "Diocese of Policastro (Italy)". GCatholic.org. (for Chronology of Bishops) ^{[self-published]}

Catholic Church titles
Preceded by Urbano Felicio	Bishop of Policastro; 1635–1651	Succeeded by Filippo Jacobio
