= Francesco Maria Tarugi =

Roman Catholic cardinal

His Eminence Francesco Maria Tarugi
- Cardinal-Priest of Santa Maria sopra Minerva
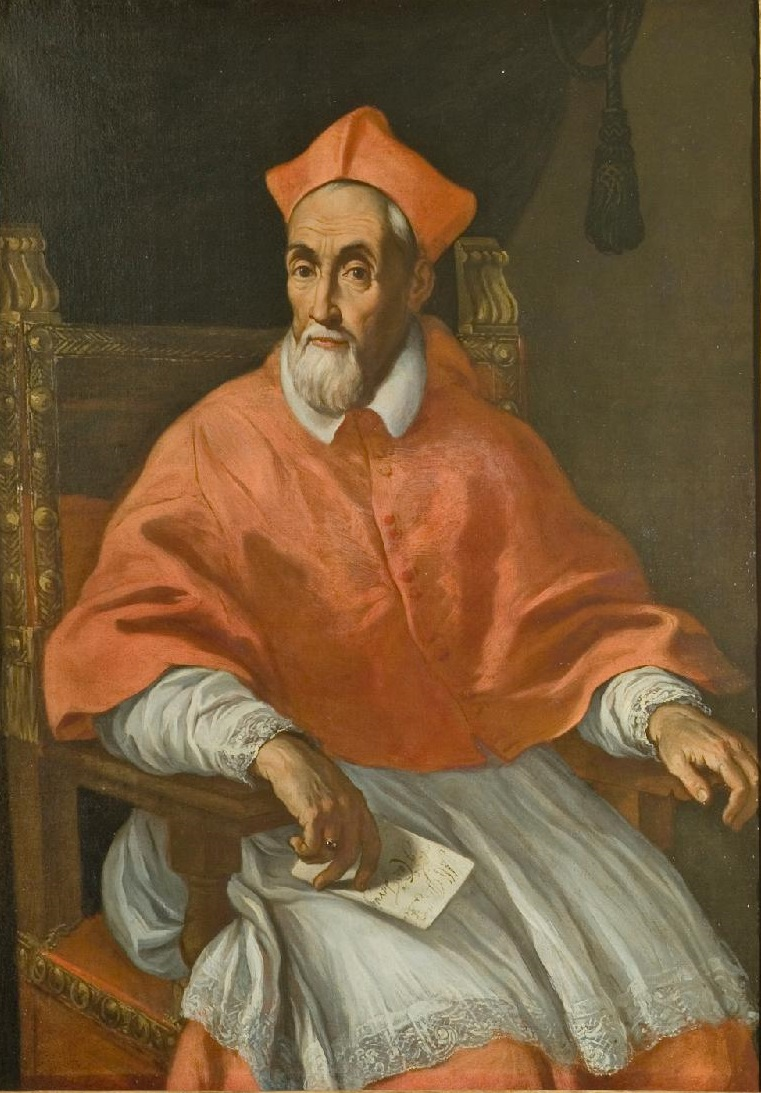
- Francesco Maria Tarugi
- Church: Catholic Church

Orders
- Consecration: 21 Dec 1592 by Alessandro Ottaviano de' Medici

Personal details
- Born: 1525 Montepulciano, Italy
- Died: 11 June, 1608 (age 83)

Francesco Maria Tarugi, C.O. (French: François-Marie Tarugi; 1525 – 11 June, 1608) was a Roman Catholic cardinal.

== Biography ==
He arrived to Rome in 1555, and there joined the oratory of St Philip Neri. In 1571, at age 45, he decided to become a priest with the Oratorians. In 1586, Tarugi moved to Naples, where he assisted in the foundation of the Oratory there. In 1592, he was appointed to the See of Avignon, where he worked to implement the reforms of the Council of Trent. On 21 Dec 1592, he was consecrated bishop by Alessandro Ottaviano de' Medici, Archbishop of Florence. Tarugi was created Cardinal in 1596, and the following year was appointed Archbishop of Siena. Pope Paul V granted Tarugi permission to return to the Roman Oratory towards the end of his life.

While bishop, he was the principal co-consecrator of Pietro Aldobrandini, Archbishop of Ravenna (1604).

Catholic Church titles
Preceded by Domenico Grimaldi	Archbishop of Avignon; 1592–1597	Succeeded by Jean-François Bordini
Preceded by Giulio Antonio Santorio	Cardinal-Priest of San Bartolomeo all'Isola; 1596–1602	Succeeded by Filippo Spinelli
Preceded by Ascanio I Piccolomini	Archbishop of Siena; 1597–1607	Succeeded by Camillo Borghese
Preceded by Girolamo Bernerio	Cardinal-Priest of Santa Maria sopra Minerva; 1602–1608	Succeeded by Filippo Spinelli
Records
Preceded by Girolamo Simoncelli	Oldest living Member of the Sacred College; 24 February 1605 - 11 June 1608	Succeeded by Mariano Pierbenedetti
