= Ilario Cortesi =

Most Reverend Ilario Cortesi
- Bishop of Policastro
- Church: Catholic Church
- Diocese: Diocese of Policastro
- In office: 1605–1608
- Predecessor: Filippo Spinelli
- Successor: Giovanni Antonio Santorio

Personal details
- Born: 1545 Naples, Italy
- Died: September 1608 (aged 62–63) Policastro, Italy

Ilario Cortesi, C.R. (1545 – September 1608) was a Roman Catholic prelate who was Bishop of Policastro (1605–1608).

Cortesi was born in Naples, Italy, and ordained a priest in the Congregation of Clerics Regular of the Divine Providence. On 10 October 1605, he was appointed by Pope Leo XI as Bishop of Policastro. He served as Bishop of Policastro until his death.

== See also ==
- Catholic Church in Italy

== External links and additional sources ==
- Cheney, David M. "Diocese of Policastro". Catholic-Hierarchy.org. (for Chronology of Bishops) ^{[self-published]}
- Chow, Gabriel. "Diocese of Policastro (Italy)". GCatholic.org. (for Chronology of Bishops) ^{[self-published]}

Catholic Church titles
Preceded by Filippo Spinelli	Bishop of Policastro; 1605–1608	Succeeded by Giovanni Antonio Santorio
