= Pjetër Budi Street =

Street in Tirana, Albania

Pjetër Budi Street (Albanian: Rruga Pjetër Budi) is a street in Tirana, the capital of Albania. It is named after Pjetër Budi, a 17th-century bishop in the district of Shkodër. It is the main road leading to the Student City (Albanian: Qytet Studenti) and although there are often no sidewalks it is a major pedestrian thoroughfare. It is also where much of the student protests of 1990 began, which gave rise to widespread riots in four of the largest cities in northern Albania.

== Culture ==
Today the street is very lively and is full of shops, cafes and restaurants and the Artistic Highschool of Tirana. Internet and wireless is widely available as are printing and copy services. Parking and sidewalks are limited, and cars are a constant disruption in this otherwise pedestrian area.

In relation to many areas of Tirana, the area of Rruga Budi is very developed, and all amenities and services are available. It is also a vibrant and cosmopolitan street due to the large presence of international workers and returned emigrants. The Embassy of the Kingdom of the Netherlands, the Embassy of Sweden, the United States Embassy and the Embassy of Switzerland are all found in this area.

== Tourism ==
Main attractions include a Children's Fairground, shopping, cafes and restaurants, housewares and musical instruments, bookmakers and video casinos, and the Student City, which is home to several thousand students, living in close to 30 buildings. The Student City itself has sports fields, shops, cafes and is well lit in the evenings.

== Transportation ==
Taxis, as well as Mini-vans travelling from Korçë, Pogradec and Elbasan wait close to the intersection of Rruga Budi and the Elbasan Road, while city busses pass by regularly. Cycling is a popular way to get around.

The neighbourhood of Rruga Budi is in close walking distance to the centre and here are plenty of hotels as well as a backpacker hostel nearby.

Rruga Pjeter Budi intersects with Mustafa Lleshi Street, Xhavid Sheqyri Demneri Street, Nasi Pavillo Street, Qemal Juranjaku Street, Rexhep Hamit Demi Street and Elbasan Street.
