= Urbano Felicio =

Bishop of Policastro (1582–1635)

Most Reverend Urbano Felicio
- Bishop of Policastro
- Church: Catholic Church
- Diocese: Diocese of Policastro
- In office: 1629–1635
- Predecessor: Giovanni Antonio Santorio
- Successor: Pietro Magri (bishop)

Orders
- Consecration: 17 April 1629 by Antonio Marcello Barberini

Personal details
- Born: 25 May 1582 L'Aquila, Italy
- Died: 1635 (aged 52–53) Policastro, Italy

Urbano Felicio (25 May 1582 – 1635) was a Roman Catholic prelate who served as Bishop of Policastro (1629–1635).

== Biography ==
Urbano Felicio was born on 25 May 1582 in L'Aquila, Italy. On 14 March 1629, he was appointed by Pope Urban VIII as Bishop of Policastro. On 17 April 1629, he was consecrated bishop by Antonio Marcello Barberini, Cardinal-Priest of Sant'Onofrio. He served as Bishop of Policastro until his death in 1635.

== External links and additional sources ==
- Cheney, David M. "Diocese of Policastro". Catholic-Hierarchy.org. (for Chronology of Bishops) ^{[self-published]}
- Chow, Gabriel. "Diocese of Policastro (Italy)". GCatholic.org. (for Chronology of Bishops) ^{[self-published]}

Catholic Church titles
Preceded by Giovanni Antonio Santorio	Bishop of Policastro; 1629–1635	Succeeded by Pietro Magri (bishop)
