= Filippo Spinelli =

Italian Catholic cardinal

His Eminence Filippo Spinelli
- Cardinal-Priest of Santa Maria sopra Minerva; Bishop of Aversa
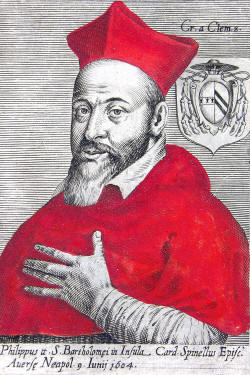
- Church: Catholic Church

Orders
- Consecration: 6 May 1592 by Alfonso Gesualdo di Conza

Personal details
- Born: 1566 Naples, Italy
- Died: 25 May 1616 (age 50) Naples, Italy

Filippo Spinelli (1566–1616) was a Roman Catholic cardinal.

On 6 May 1592, he was consecrated bishop by Alfonso Gesualdo di Conza, Cardinal-Bishop of Ostia e Velletri.

While bishop, he was the principal consecrator of Giuseppe Saluzzo, Bishop of Ruvo (1604); and Jan Andrzej Próchnicki, Bishop of Kamyanets-Podilskyi (1607).

Catholic Church titles
Preceded by Marco Cattaneo (bishop)	Titular Bishop of Rhodus; 1592–1603	Succeeded by Alfonso Gonzaga
Preceded by Ferdinando Farnese	Apostolic Nuncio to Emperor; 1598–1604	Succeeded by Juan Esteban Ferrero
Preceded by Ferdinando Spinelli	Bishop of Policastro; 1603–1605	Succeeded by Ilario Cortesi
Preceded by François-Marie Tarugi	Cardinal-Priest of San Bartolomeo all'Isola; 1604–1608	Succeeded by Michelangelo Tonti
Preceded by Bernardino Morra	Bishop of Aversa; 1605–1616	Succeeded by Carlo Carafa
Preceded by François-Marie Tarugi	Cardinal-Priest of Santa Maria sopra Minerva; 1608–1616	Succeeded by Ladislao d'Aquino
