= Benedetto Accolti the Younger =

Italian cardinal

His Eminence Benedetto Accolti
- Cardinal, Archbishop of Ravenna
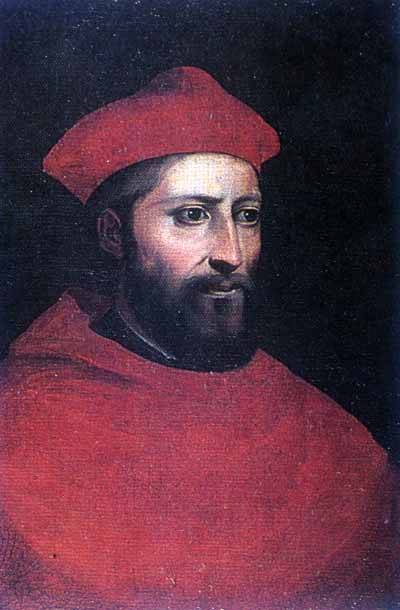
- Church: Roman Catholic
- Archdiocese: Ravenna
- Installed: 17 August 1524—21 September 1549
- Predecessor: Pietro Accolti
- Successor: sede vacante
- Other post: Cardinal-Priest of Sant'Eusebio
- Previous post: Bishop of Cremona

Orders
- Created cardinal: 3 May 1527 by Pope Clement VII
- Rank: Cardinal-Priest

Personal details
- Born: 29 October 1497 Arezzo, Republic of Florence
- Died: 21 September 1549 (aged 51) Florence, Republic of Florence

Benedetto Accolti the younger (29 October 1497 – 21 September 1549) was an Italian cardinal. He was born in Florence, Italy, the son of Michele Accolti, patrician of Arezzo, and Lucrezia Alamanni. He died in Florence of an apoplexy. He was a nephew of Cardinal Pietro Accolti and therefore was known as Il Giovane or the Cardinal of Ravenna.

== Early life ==
He studied at the universities of Florence and Pisa. Accolti began his ecclesiastical career in the Roman Curia, following the steps of his uncle.

== Episcopate ==
He was promoted bishop of Cadiz on 24 July 1521, before reaching the canonical age of 27, so he was named administrator after his uncle. Then he was transferred to Cremona on 16 March 1523 again after his uncle and then named Secretary of Pope Clement VII the same year.

== Cardinalate ==
He was created cardinal priest in the consistory of 3 May 1527 with the title of Sant'Eusebio, again after his uncle. On 17 August 1524, he was promoted to the metropolitan see of Ravenna after his uncle. He was named administrator of Diocese of Bovino and then of the Diocese of Policastro until 1535. In addition, James V of Scotland appointed him Cardinal-Protector of Scottish Affairs at Rome, dealing with church appointments and negotiations for the King's marriage. His uncle, the Cardinal of Ancona, had performed this role since the regency of the Duke of Albany.

He participated in the Conclave in 1534. The new Pope Paul III deprived him of his cardinalate on 27 August 1534, and imprisoned him in the Castel Sant'Angelo, accusing him of misspending 19,000 ducats for the expedition against the Turks. The next year he paid a large sum of money and was restored to the cardinalate under some conditions.

He wrote some works in Latin, including poetry. At the request of the later Pope, he wrote a treatise to assert the right of the pope to the Kingdom of Naples.
He died in Florence on 21 September 1549 in Florence and was buried in the church of S. Lorenzo, Florence.

Catholic Church titles
Preceded by Pietro de Accolti de Aretio	Administrator of Cádiz; 1521–1523	Succeeded by Jerónimo Teodoli
Preceded by Girolamo Trevisanato	Bishop of Cremona; 1523–1524	Succeeded by Pietro de Accolti de Aretio
Preceded by Pietro de Accolti de Aretio	Archbishop of Ravenna; 1524–1549	Succeeded by Ranuccio Farnese
Preceded by Pietro de Accolti de Aretio	Cardinal-Priest of Sant'Eusebio; 1527–1549	Succeeded by Francisco Mendoza Bobadilla
Preceded by Giovanni de' Capellani	Administrator of Bovino; 1530–1535	Succeeded by Esteban Gabriel Merino
Preceded by Giovanni Pirro Scorna	Administrator of Policastro; 1531–1545	Succeeded by Andrea Matteo Palmieri
