= Kür Qaraqaşlı =

- Municipality
- Location within Azerbaijan
- Coordinates: 39°31′51″N 48°58′40″E
- Country: Azerbaijan
- Rayon: Salyan

Population
  - Total: 2,484
- Time zone: UTC+4 (AZT)
  - Summer (DST): UTC+5 (AZT)

Kür Qaraqaşlı (also, Kyurkarakashly, Korakashly, and Kyurkara Kashly) is a village and municipality in the Salyan Rayon of Azerbaijan. It has a population of 2,484.
