= Bernardo Accolti =

Italian poet

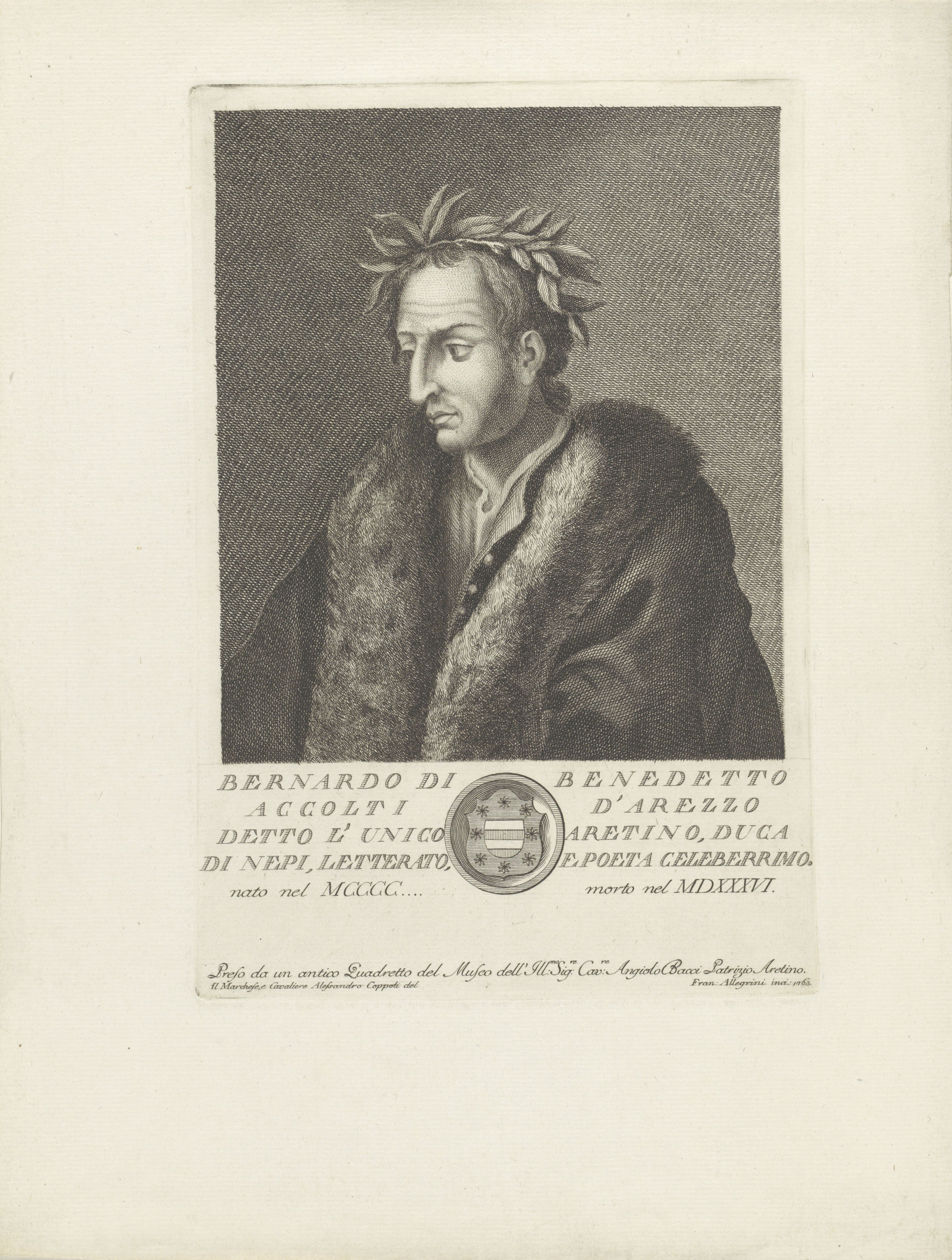
- Born: September 14, 1465; Arezzo
- Died: March 1, 1536 (aged 70)
- Other names: l'Unico Aretino
- Occupation: Poet
- Known for: Reciter of impromptu verse
- Parent: Benedetto Accolti

Bernardo Accolti (September 11, 1465 – March 1, 1536) was an Italian poet.

He was born at Arezzo, the son of Benedetto Accolti.

Known by his contemporaries as l'Unico Aretino, he acquired fame as a reciter of impromptu verse. He was listened to by large crowds, composed of the most educated men and the most distinguished prelates of the age. Among others, Cardinal Pietro Bembo left on record a testimony to his talent. He was so regarded and received such lavish remuneration by Pope Leo X that he was able to buy the Duchy of Nepi.

It is probable that he succeeded better in his extemporaneous productions than in those which were the fruit of deliberation. His works, under the title Virginia, Comedia, Capitoli e Strambotti di Messer Bernardo Accolti Aretino, were published at Florence in 1513, and have been reprinted several times.
