= Shëngjin, Tirana =

Shëngjin
- Village
- Location within Albania
- Coordinates: 41°19′N 20°4′E
- Country: Albania
- County: Tirana
- Municipality: Tirana
- Administrative unit: Shëngjergj
- Time zone: UTC+1 (CET)
  - Summer (DST): UTC+2 (CEST)

Shëngjin (Albanian for Saint Jean) is a village in the former municipality of Shëngjergj in Tirana County, Albania. At the 2015 local government reform it became part of the municipality Tirana.

== Demographic history ==
Shëngjin is recorded in the Ottoman defter of 1467 as a village belonging to the region of Tamadhea in the vilayet of Çermenika. Shëngjin was a relatively settlement with only five households which were represented by the following household heads: Andrija Rili, Gjon Menkoli, Petër Mizijo, Gjon Pigonti, and Gjon Bashka.
