= Beşdəli, Zangilan =

Beşdəli
- Location within Azerbaijan
- Coordinates: 39°05′47″N 46°36′06″E
- Country: Azerbaijan
- Rayon: Zangilan
- Time zone: UTC+4 (AZT)
  - Summer (DST): UTC+5 (AZT)

Beşdəli (also, Beshdali and Besh-Dyali) is a village in the Zangilan Rayon, located in the south-west of the country of Azerbaijan. It was under the control of Armenian forces of the Nagorno-Karabakh, however, it was recaptured by the Azerbaijan Army on or around November 7, 2020.
