= Niccolò Francesco Missanelli =

Bishop of Policastro (died 1577)

Most Reverend Niccolò Francesco Missanelli
- Bishop of Policastro
- Church: Catholic Church
- Diocese: Diocese of Policastro
- In office: 1543–1577
- Predecessor: Fabrizio Arcella
- Successor: Ludovico Bentivoglio

Orders
- Consecration: 1545

Personal details
- Died: 1577 Policastro, Italy

Niccolò Francesco Missanelli (died 1577) was a Roman Catholic prelate who served as Bishop of Policastro (1543–1577).

== Biography ==
On 7 Jun 1543, Niccolò Francesco Missanelli was appointed by Pope Paul III as Bishop of Policastro. In 1545, he was consecrated bishop. He served as Bishop of Policastro until his death in 1577.

Catholic Church titles
Preceded by Fabrizio Arcella	Bishop of Policastro; 1543–1577	Succeeded by Ludovico Bentivoglio
