= Democratic Party of the Right =

Political party in Albania

- Founded: 1994
- Split from: Democratic Party

The Democratic Party of Right is a political party in Albania. It was established in 1994 as a split from the Democratic Party.
