= Beşdəli, Agdash =

Beşdəli
- Location within Azerbaijan
- Coordinates: 40°36′N 47°30′E
- Country: Azerbaijan
- Rayon: Agdash
- Time zone: UTC+4 (AZT)
  - Summer (DST): UTC+5 (AZT)

Beşdəli (also, Beshdali and Beshdelli) is a village in the Agdash Rayon of Azerbaijan.
