= Beşdəli, Sabirabad =

Beşdəli
- Municipality
- Location within Azerbaijan
- Coordinates: 39°54′11″N 48°54′46″E
- Country: Azerbaijan
- Rayon: Sabirabad

Population
  - Total: 427
- Time zone: UTC+4 (AZT)
  - Summer (DST): UTC+5 (AZT)

Beşdəli (also, Beshdali, Yakha-Bashtali, and Yakha-Beshtali) is a village and municipality in the Sabirabad District of Azerbaijan. It has a population of 427.
