= Gur i Bardhë =

Guri Bardhë
- Village
- Location within Albania
- Coordinates: 41.45°N 20.07°E
- Country: Albania
- County: Dibër
- Municipality: Klos
- Administrative unit: Xibër

Population (2015)
  - Total: 700
- Time zone: UTC+1 (CET)
  - Summer (DST): UTC+2 (CEST)

Gur i Bardhë (Albanian definite form: Guri i Bardhë, in English: White Stone; also known in the Middle Ages as Petralba) is a village in the municipality of Klos, Albania.

== History ==
Gur i Bardhë is a small mountain village situated above the Mat Valley. There is still no exact date that corresponds to the establishment of this village, but the few excavations and discoveries that have been made in this village reveal its early existence. Stone working tools that match the time of stone use have been found. Old cemeteries have also been found, with symbolic objects and engraved stone tiles. Some historians such have connected the name Petralba with Albanopolis, a Roman-era city mentioned by Ptolemy.

In Gur i Bardhë there is a ruined castle called Petralba. The castle is located below the village Gur i Bardhë and above the village of Fshat. It is built on a mountain ridge 778 m above sea level and is not far from the Xibri Castle. According to various assumptions and traditions, it is believed that this castle was built after the collapse (destruction) of the Xibri one. Both of these castles were located at the foot of the main road, Dibër–Murriz Pass–Durrës.

The castle was captured by Skanderbeg during the winter of 1443, after Skanderbeg gave the Ottoman garrison the opportunity to flee and surrender the castle.

The village played an important role during the Albanian Middle Ages, being one of the largest producers and processors of gunpowder, with several gunpowder weapons being excavated in the area.

Gur i Bardhë (Bilakamin) is recorded in the Ottoman defter of 1467 as a hass-ı mir-liva settlement in the vilayet of Mati. The village had a total of 46 households and the anthroponymy attested depicts an Albanian character: Andrija Gazi, Peter Limani, Gazi, Gjeç Aleksi, Ishri Buluzi, Dhonabi son-in-law of Ishri, Gjin Rakizi, Martin Muzaka, Kita Dajxhi, Lesh Çokani, Gjon Puliti, Lazar Thana, Kola Spavali, Gjin Boliti, Gjon Senkuri, Kal Sghuni, Gjergj Bulushi, Andrija Shirgji, Lika Duka, Lazar Bulushi, Mastër Nikolla, Gjin Nikolla, Lal Nikolla, Veske, Lalnikolla, Gjin Spavali, Gjergj Jani, Kal Mizi, Todor Kuprini, Gjin Biza, Peter Skalabra, Gjin Skalabra, Andrija Koçani, Gjin Mirzi, Gjergj Bratisllavi, Peter Boliti, Engjëll Koçani, Gjon Bulushi, Nika Gazi, Gjon Spavali, Peter Lumashi, Nika Gropa, Peter Bulushi, and Gjin Koçani.

== Notable people ==
- Pjetër Budi, prominent humanist scholar of the Albanian Renaissance.
- Abdi Baleta Albanian diplomat and politician.
