= Roman Catholic Diocese of Policastro =

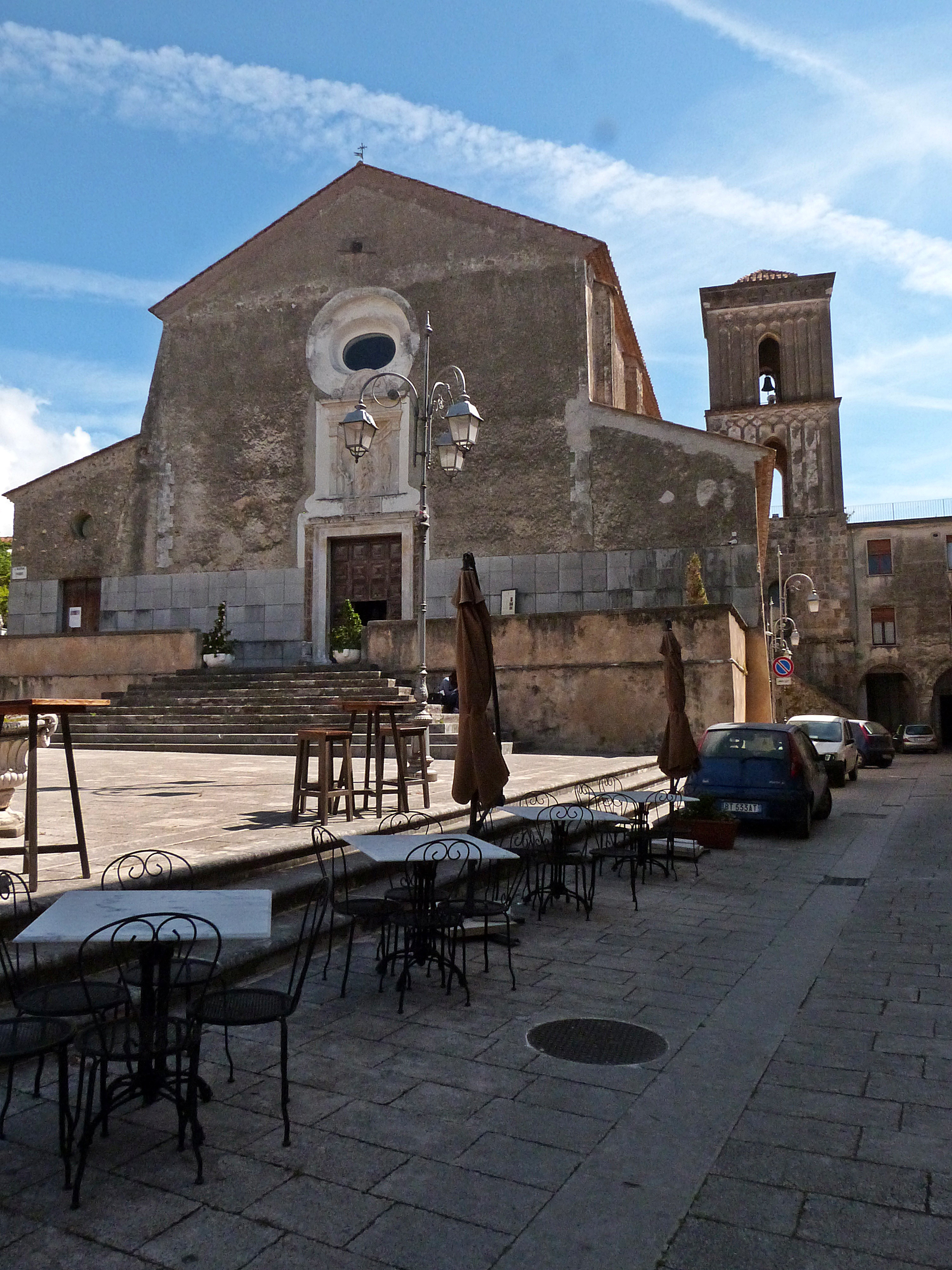
co-cathedral at Policastro

The Italian Catholic diocese of Policastro, in Campania, existed until 1986. In that year the diocese was suppressed, and its territory united to the diocese of Teggiano-Policastro. Throughout its existence, Policastro was a suffragan of the archdiocese of Salerno.

== History ==
In his Historia naturalis (Book III, ch. 17), the elder Pliny gives a list of the peoples of Lucania, in alphabetical order: "Mediterranei Lucanorum Atinates, Bantini, Grumentini, Potentini, Sontini, Sirini, Tergilani Ursentini, quibus Numestrani junguntur." The Atinates had their center at Atina, the Grumentini had their center at Grumentum, and the Tergilani at Teggiano.

Policastro is believed to be the ancient Pituntia, though there is no source which explicitly so states. It was the last city in Calabria that remained faithful to the empire of Constantinople, until it was captured by the Normans under Robert Guiscard in 1065. The city became part of the dukedom of his brother Roger. In 1290, it belonged to Pietro Ruffo, Count of Catanzaro, having been given to him by King Charles of Anjou.

=== Foundation of the diocese ===
On 22 July 1051, Pope Leo IX issued the bull "Officium Sacerdotale", in which he confirmed the metropolitan status of the archbishops of Salerno, and the privilege of ordering and consecrating the bishops of Paestum, Nola, Conza, Cosenza, and Bisignano. There is no mention of Policastro. On 24 March 1058, Pope Stephen IX issued the bull also called "Officium Sacerdotale", in which he confirmed for the archbishops of Salerno the right of consecrating bishops for (in addition to those named by Pope Leo) Malvito, Policastro, Marsico, Martirano, and Caciano. The archbishops, therefore, had the right to consecrate bishops for Policastro by 1058, though there is no indication that they actually did so. The earliest bishop of Policastro of whom evidence survives is Bishop Petrus Pappacarbone (1079–1109).

Pietro da Pappacarbone (1079), a Benedictine of Cava de' Tirreni, resigned after governing the diocese for thirty years, and was succeeded by Arnaldus on 17 February 1110.

The cathedral was dedicated to the Assumption of the Body of the Virgin Mary into Heaven. The cathedral was administered by a corporation called the Chapter, consisting of two dignities (the Archdeacon and the Cantor) and ten Canons. The bishops of Policastro had two residences, one in the city next to the cathedral, and the other at Orsaia, where the seminary for clergy was also located.

=== Frederick II vs. Innocent III ===
In 1211, a crisis arose in regard to the diocese of Policastro, with serious ecclesiastical and political implications. Upon the death of their bishop, the cathedral Chapter met and unanimously elected the archpriest of the collegiate church of Saponaria. Several canons carried the electoral announcement to Messana to the emperor, to obtain the assent of the Emperor Frederick II. The emperor (per regis familiares) rejected the bishop-elect, as well as all the other possible candidates named by the canons, and made it clear that he wished them to nominate his physician, Jacopo. The Chapter, fearing to incur the anger of the emperor, and also thoroughly unhappy, elected the physician. They then applied to the archbishop of Salerno, the metropolitan for confirmation and consecration, presenting him with letters from Frederick and from Cardinal Gregory of S. Teodoro, the papal legate. The archbishop, before proceeding, sought a papal response. Pope Innocent III suspended action on the cases of the bishops of Policastro and of Sarno, since he wanted to send nuncios to the king. In the meantime, Jacopo, sought help from the king. The Chapter of Policastro told the nuncios that they did not want Jacopo, and lodged an appeal at the papal court. Attempts were made to pressure the papal legate into acting on behalf of Jacopo, but he declined to end the matter and ordered the canons into his presence, bringing with them the papal documents in their possession. In the meantime, Jacopo obtained, with the legate's knowledge, permission for his consecration from the archbishops of Taranto and Santa Severina, and the bishop of Cerenza., and appeared in Policastro for his consecration; the canons refused to receive him, and appealed to the pope to reverse everything that had been done in the case of Jacopo.

Pope Innocent appointed the archbishop of Cosenza and the abbot of Flore to investigate the claims of Jacopo, the Chapter of Policastro, and the archbishop of Salerno. After taking testimony, they sent a written report to the pope, along with procurators of the named parties, where they were dealt with by Cardinal Benedetto of Santa Susanna on the pope's behalf. Pope Innocent then declared the election of Jacopo as contrary to canon law, as well as to the concordat which he had negotiated with Constance, Queen of Sicily, and therefore void. He ordered the Chapter to proceed with the confirmation of the archpriest of Saponaria by the archbishop of Salerno. He informed the bishop of Capaccio and the abbot of Cava as to what had been taking place, and ordered them to observe his rulings, and authorized them to impose ecclesiastical censures on those who violated them.

In 1239, the Emperor Frederick II was once again excommunicated by Pope Gregory IX. The bull cites, as a contributory reason, that he had left numerous dioceses without a bishop in his realms, including Policastro.

=== Ottoman fleets ===
Policastro's position facing the Tyrrhenian Sea (or the Gulf of Policastro, as it is called locally) made it particularly vulnerable to invasion and raiding by pirates. In 1532 and 1544, the Ottoman admiral Ariadeno Barbarossa (Hayreddin) attacked the city. In July 1552, the Ottoman fleet of 123 ships, led by Dragut Rais, ravaged the entire coast and besieged Policastro for three days. The city was destroyed, and the survivors either made galley slaves or sold in the slave markets. Similar fates struck Vibonati, Santa Marina, San Giovanni a Piro, Torre Orsaia, and Roccagloriosa.

In 1664, sufficiently grave charges as to the conduct of the bishop of Policastro, Filippo Jacobio, in the territory of Orsaia, that Pope Alexander VII, on 1 December 1664, issued a commission to his nuncio in Naples, Giulio Spinola, Archbishop of Laodicea, to launch an investigation and open legal proceedings against the bishop. The nuncio, however, was not to proceed to a verdict, but instead to submit his findings and conclusion immediately and directly to the pope for final disposition. In 1667, Bishop Jacobio announced that his cathedral, with six chapels, and the sacristy were practically in ruins. He therefore began to rebuild the episcopal palace at Orsaia, a town with a population of c. 1,500, where he preferred to live rather than in Policastro, which was nearly deserted and falling apart. In this palace, Bishop Vincenzo de Sylva, O.P. (1672) was besieged by Count Fabrizio Carafa.

In the mid-17th century, the entire diocese had a population estimated at 50,000. In 1671, the city of Policastro had a population of 61 persons. In 1747, the population had risen to about 80 inhabitants. In 1980, the total population of the diocese was said to be around 40,750.

=== Diocesan synods ===
A diocesan synod was an irregularly held, but important, meeting of the bishop of a diocese and his clergy. Its purpose was (1) to proclaim generally the various decrees already issued by the bishop; (2) to discuss and ratify measures on which the bishop chose to consult with his clergy; (3) to publish statutes and decrees of the diocesan synod, of the provincial synod, and of the Holy See.

A diocesan synod was held by Bishop Urbano Felicio (1629–1635) in 1631, and another in 1632. On 29 June 1638, Bishop Pietro Magri (1635–1651) presided over a diocesan synod. Bishop Vincenzo Maria da Silva, O.P. (1671–1679) presided over a diocesan synod in 1674. Bishop Giuseppe de Rosa (1775–1793) held a diocesan synod on 6–7 May 1784. A diocesan synod was held by Bishop Ludovico Lodovico on 18 April 1816. Bishop Nicola-Maria Laudisio (1824–1862) presided over a diocesan synod in 1830.

=== Diocesan reorganization ===
The Second Vatican Council (1962–1965), in order to ensure that all Catholics received proper spiritual attention, decreed the reorganization of the diocesan structure of Italy and the consolidation of small and struggling dioceses. It also recommended the abolition of anomalous units such as exempt territorial prelatures.

On 8 September 1976, the diocese of Policastro lost territory when Diocese of Tursi-Lagonegro was established.

On 18 February 1984, the Vatican and the Italian State signed a new and revised concordat. Based on the revisions, a set of Normae was issued on 15 November 1984, which was accompanied in the next year, on 3 June 1985, by enabling legislation. According to the agreement, the practice of having one bishop govern two separate dioceses at the same time, aeque personaliter, was abolished. Instead, the Vatican continued consultations which had begun under Pope John XXIII for the merging of small dioceses, especially those with personnel and financial problems, into one combined diocese. On 30 September 1986, Pope John Paul II ordered that the dioceses of Diano (Teggiano) and Policastro be merged into one diocese with one bishop, with the Latin title Dioecesis Dianensis-Policastrensis, or, in Italian Diocesi di Teggiano-Policastro. The seat of the diocese was to be in Teggiano, and the cathedral of Teggiano was to serve as the cathedral of the merged dioceses. The cathedral in Policastro was to become a co-cathedral, and the cathedral Chapters of Policastro was to be a Capitulum Concathedralis. There was to be only one diocesan Tribunal, in Teggiano, and likewise one seminary, one College of Consultors, and one Priests' Council. The territory of the new diocese was to include the territory of the former dioceses of Diano and Policastro.

== Bishops of Policastro ==
Erected: 11th Century
Latin Name: Policastrensis
Metropolitan: Archdiocese of Salerno

=== from 1079 to 1500 ===
- Pietro da Pappacarbone (1079–1109)
- Arnaldus (attested 1110)

...

- Petrus
- Otto
- Goffridus (d. 1139)
- Johannes (d. 1172)

...

- [Gerardo] da Saponara (1211–1218?)
- Guilelmus de Licio, O.Min. (c. 1222)

...

- Johannes Castellomata (1254–1256?)
- Fabianus
- Marcus
- Bartholomaeus (attested 1278)
- Paganus (attested 1290–1310)
- Thomasius
- Francesco Capograsso (1353–1361)
- Nicolaus (1361–1386?) Avignon Obedience
- Lucas de Roccacontrata, 0.Min. (1392–1403) Roman Obedience
- Nicolaus (restored: 1403– ? )
- Nicolas, O.S.Bas. (1418–1438)
- Jacobus Lancelotti (1438–1445)
- Carlo da Napoli, O.E.S.A. (1445– ? )
- Enrico Languardo (1466–1470)
- Gabriele Guidano (1471–1484)
- Girolamo Almensa (1485–1493)
- Gabriele Altilio (1493–1501)

=== from 1500 to 1986 ===
- Luigi d'Aragona (1501–1504 Resigned) Administrator
- Bernardo Lauri (1504–1516)
- Giovanni Pirro Scorna (1516–1530 Resigned)
- Benedetto Accolti (1531–1535 Resigned) Administrator
- Andrea Matteo Palmieri (1535–1537) Administrator
- Fabrizio Arcella (1537–1542 Resigned)
- Ubertus Gambara (1542–1543) Administrator
- Niccolò Francesco Missanelli (1543–1577)
- Ludovico Bentivoglio (1577–1581)
- Ferdinando Spinelli (4 Dec 1581 – 1603)
- Filippo Spinelli (1603–1605)
- Ilario Cortesi, C.R. (10 Oct 1605 – Sep 1608)
- Giovanni Antonio Santorio (26 Apr 1610 – May 1628)
- Urbano Felicio (14 Mar 1629 – 1635)
- Pietro Magri (1 Oct 1635 – Oct 1651)
- Filippo Jacobio (Giacomo) (26 Aug 1652 – 17 Apr 1671 Resigned)
- Vincenzo Maria da Silva, O.P. (4 May 1671 –1679)
- Tommaso de Rosa (8 May 1679 – 10 Oct 1695)
- Giacinto Camillo Maradei (2 Apr 1696 – 2 Sep 1705)
- Marco Antonio de Rosa (14 Dec 1705 – 28 Nov 1709)
- Andrea Roberti (27 Nov 1713 – 8 Apr 1747)
- Giovanni Battista Minucci, O.F.M.Conv. (1747–1761 Resigned)
- Francesco Pantuliani (25 Jan 1762 – 21 Jun 1775)
- Giuseppe de Rosa (13 Nov 1775 – 1793)
- Ludovico Ludovici, O.F.M.Obs. (1797–1819)
- Gaetano Barbaroli (4 Jun 1819 – 1823)
- Nicola-Maria Laudisio, C.SS.R. (3 May 1824 – 6 Jan 1862)

Sede vacante (1862–1872)

- Giuseppe Maria Cione (23 Feb 1872 – 7 Sep 1898)
- Giovanni Vescia (18 Apr 1899 – 27 Mar 1924 Resigned)
- Francesco Cammarota (13 Aug 1927 – 15 Dec 1935)
- Federico Pezzullo (23 Jan 1937 – 10 Sep 1979)
- Umberto Luciano Altomare (16 Sep 1980 – 3 Feb 1986)

30 September 1986: The diocese of Policastro was suppressed, and its territory added to the Diocese of Diano-Teggiano, with the name Diocese of Teggiano-Policastro, preserving the name of the former diocese.

== See also ==
- Policastro Bussentino
- List of Catholic dioceses in Italy

== Bibliography ==
=== Reference works for bishops ===
- Gams, Pius Bonifatius (1873). Series episcoporum Ecclesiae catholicae: quotquot innotuerunt a beato Petro apostolo (in Latin). Ratisbon: Typis et Sumptibus Georgii Josephi Manz. pp. 912-913. (Use with caution; obsolete)
- Eubel, Conradus, ed. (1913). Hierarchia catholica medii aevi (in Latin). Vol. I (1098–1431) (second ed.). Münster: Libreria Regensbergiana.
- Eubel, Conradus, ed. (1914). Hierarchia catholica medii aevi (in Latin). Vol. II (1431–1503) (second ed.). Münster: Libreria Regensbergiana.
- Eubel, Conradus; Gulik, Guilelmus (1923). Hierarchia catholica medii et recentioris aevi (in Latin). Vol. III (1503–c.1600) (second ed.). Münster: Libreria Regensbergiana.
- Gauchat, Patritius (Patrice) (1935). Hierarchia catholica medii et recentioris aevi (in Latin). Vol. IV (1592-1667). Münster: Libraria Regensbergiana.
- Ritzler, Remigius; Sefrin, Pirminus (1952). Hierarchia catholica medii et recentioris aevi (in Latin). Vol. V (1667-1730). Patavii: Messagero di S. Antonio.
- Ritzler, Remigius; Sefrin, Pirminus (1958). Hierarchia catholica medii et recentis aevi (in Latin). Vol. VI (1730-1799). Patavii: Messagero di S. Antonio.
- Ritzler, Remigius; Sefrin, Pirminus (1968). Hierarchia Catholica medii et recentioris aevi (in Latin). Vol. VII (1800–1846). Monasterii: Libr. Regensburgiana.

=== Studies ===
- Baldini, Andrea; Capobianco, Giuseppe; Alliegro, Raffaele (2022). Torre Orsaia. Mille anni di storia. (in Italian) Santa Maria Capua Vetere: Spartaco, 2022.
- Cappelletti, Giuseppe (1866). Le chiese d'Italia della loro origine sino ai nostri giorni (in Italian). Vol. vigesimo (20). Venezia: Giuseppe Antonelli. pp. 367–377.
- D'Avino, Vincenzio (1848). Cenni storici sulle chiese arcivescovili, vescovili, e prelatizie (nullius) del regno delle due Sicilie (in Italian). Naples: dalle stampe di Ranucci. pp. 537–539. [article by Gaetano Porfirio]
- De Rosa, Gabriele (1969), "Il Sinodo di Policastro del 1784 e la censura napoletana," Rivista di studi Salernitani 4 (Luglio-Dicembre 1969), pp. 101-125.
- Ebner, Pietro (1982). Chiesa, baroni e popolo nel Cilento. (in Italian). Vol. I (Roma: Edizioni di storia e letteratura).
- Kehr, Paul Fridolin (1935). Italia pontificia. Vol. VIII: Regnum Normannorum — Campania. Berlin: Weidmann. (in Latin)
- Lanzoni, Francesco (1927). Le diocesi d'Italia dalle origini al principio del secolo VII (an. 604). Faenza: F. Lega. (in Italian)
- Mattei-Cerasoli, Leone (1919). "Da archivii e biblioteche: Di alcuni vescovi poco noti". (in Italian). In: Archivio storico per le province Neapolitane 44 (Napoli: Luigi Lubrano 1919). pp. 310-335.
- Laudisius, N. (1831). Policastrensis dioeceseos historico-chronologica synopsis. (in Italian) Neapoli 1831.
- Strafforelli, Gustavo (ed.) (1900). La Patria: Geografia dell'Italia. (in Italian). Vol. II. Torino: Unione Tipografico Editrice.
- Ughelli, Ferdinando; Coleti, NIccolo (1721). Italia sacra sive De episcopis Italiæ, et insularum adjacentium (in Latin). Vol. Tomus septimus (7). Venice: apud Sebastianum Coleti. pp. 542–570.
- Volpe, Francesco (2004). La diocesi di Policastro nella prima metà del Settecento. (in Italian). Napoli: Edizioni scientifiche italiane, 2004.
