= Pietro Accolti =

Italian Roman Catholic cardinal and judge of the Roman Rota

His Eminence Pietro Accolti
- Cardinal-Bishop of Sabina
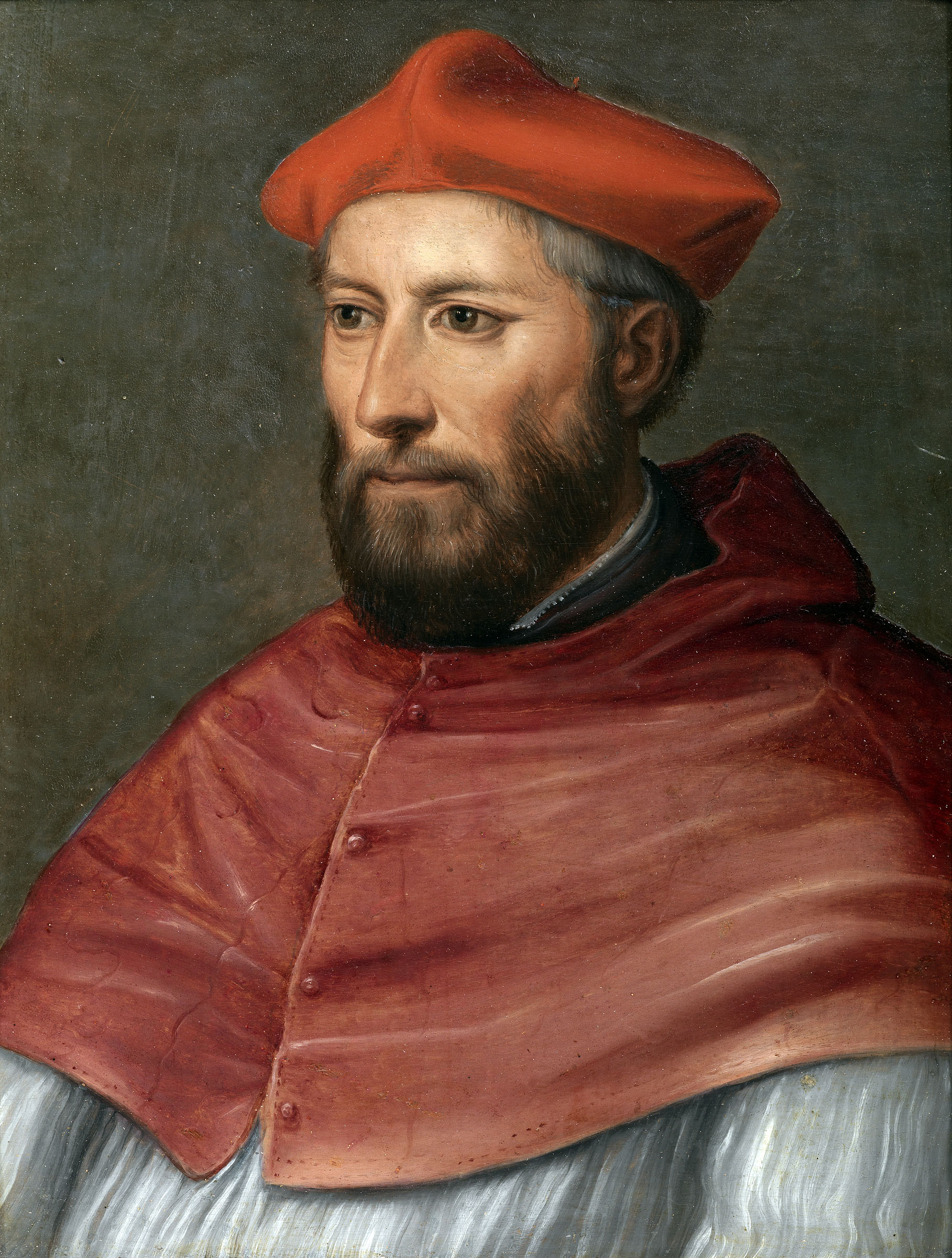
- Portrait by Baldassare Peruzzi, 16th century
- Church: Catholic Church
- Appointed: 15 June 1524
- Term ended: 11 December 1532
- Predecessor: Antonio Maria Ciocchi del Monte
- Successor: Giovanni Domenico de Cupis
- Previous posts: Bishop of Ancona (1505–14); Cardinal-Priest of Sant'Eusebio (1511–27); Cardinal-Bishop of Albano (1523–24)

Orders
- Created cardinal: 10 March 1511 by Pope Julius II
- Rank: Cardinal-Bishop

Personal details
- Born: 15 March 1455 Florence, Tuscany
- Died: 11 December 1532 (aged 77) Rome, Papal States

Pietro Accolti (15 March 1455 – 11 December 1532), known as the "cardinal of Ancona", was an Italian Roman Catholic cardinal and judge of the Roman Rota.

== Life ==
He was born in Florence on 15 March 1455, the son of the famous jurist Benedetto Accolti the Elder and his wife Laura Federighi. He studied law at Pisa. In 1481, due to the influence of his uncle, Francesco Accolti, master of law, Pietro was appointed a reader of canon law. He moved to Rome sometime after 1485, and was appointed an auditor of the Roman Rota, that is, a judge who hears cases.

In 1500, he became Dean of the Rota. He was made Bishop of Ancona in 1505, but continued sitting with the Rota. At a consistory on 10 March 1511, Pope Julius II named him Cardinal-Priest with the title of Sant'Eusebio. That same year, he given the administration of the bishoprics of Cadiz and Maillezais. To these were added the dioceses of Arras in 1518, and Ancona in 1523. He also had, as cardinal-bishop, starting from 18 Dec. 1523, the suburbicarian dioceses of Albano (until May 20, 1524), of Palestrina (May 20-June 15, 1524), and, finally, of Sabina (from June 15).

He was abbreviator under Pope Leo X, and in that capacity drew up in 1520 the bull against Martin Luther.

During the 1521–1522 papal conclave that followed the death of Leo, Cardinal Accolti was one of the Papabile who opposed the Emperor, receiving five votes on the first ballot. This prompted a satire on the part of Pietro Aretino, whose patron, Cardinal Giulio de' Medici, was also a contender. Aretino mocked Cardinal Accolti's not always impeccable morals, and the fact that he was rumored to have three illegitimate children. Mazzucchelli says Accolti had a daughter Caterina, who took the veil; a son Hadrian, alive in 1521; and a son Benedetto, supposedly hanged in Rome in 1564, for having taken part in a conspiracy against Pope Pius V. However, the last was more likely the son of his nephew Benedetto.

In 1524, he was made Archbishop of Ravenna (1524) by Pope Clement VII.

Accolti was an active participant in the main political and ecclesiastical events of his era. French chancellor Antoine Duprat, considered Accolti the most cultured and literate member of the college of cardinals. Accolti died on 11 December 1532, in Rome and was buried in the church of Santa Maria del Popolo, without an inscription.

== Sources ==
- W.W. (1842), "Accolti, Pietro," in: The Biographical Dictionary of the Society for the Diffusion of Useful Knowledge. Vol. I. London: Longman, Brown, Green, and Longmans. 1842. pp. 225–226.
- Miranda, Salvador. "ACCOLTI, Pietro (1455-1532)". The Cardinals of the Holy Roman Church. Florida International University. OCLC 53276621.
- Cheney, David M. "Pietro Cardinal de Accolti de Aretio". Catholic-Hierarchy.org. ^{[self-published]}

Attribution

Records
Preceded by Domenico Giacobazzi	Oldest living Member of the Sacred College; 1528 - 12 December 1532	Succeeded by Segismundo Pappacoda
