= Beştalı, Neftchala =

Beştalı
- Location within Azerbaijan
- Coordinates: 39.5664°N 49.0075°E
- Country: Azerbaijan
- Rayon: Neftchala
- Time zone: UTC+4 (AZT)
  - Summer (DST): UTC+5 (AZT)

Beştalı is a village in the municipality of Qaraqaşlı in the Neftchala Rayon of Azerbaijan.
