= Beştalı, Salyan =

Beştalı
- Municipality
- Location within Azerbaijan
- Coordinates: 39°34′N 49°01′E
- Country: Azerbaijan
- Rayon: Salyan

Population
  - Total: 520
- Time zone: UTC+4 (AZT)
  - Summer (DST): UTC+5 (AZT)

Beştalı (also, Beshtali) is a village and municipality in the Salyan Rayon of Azerbaijan. It has a population of 520.

== Notable natives ==
- Maharram Dadashov — Hero of the Soviet Union.
