= Zall-Bastar =

Village in Albania

- Administrative unit
- Location within Albania
- Coordinates: 41°26′N 19°56′E
- Country: Albania
- County: Tirana
- Municipality: Tirana

Population (2011)
  - Administrative unit: 3,380
- Time zone: UTC+1 (CET)
  - Summer (DST): UTC+2 (CEST)
- Postal Code: 1042
- Area Code: (0)49

Zall-Bastar (Albanian: [zaɫ bastaɾ]) is a village and administrative unit in the municipality of Tirana, central Albania. As of the 2011 census, the administrative unit of Zall-Bastar had an estimated population of 3,380 of whom 1,732 were men and 1,648 women.

== Demographic history ==
the village of Bastari appears in the Ottoman defter of 1467 as a part of the timar of Mustafa in the nahiyah of Benda. It was a relatively small settlement with a total of only five households which were represented by: Miho Manesi, Gjon Guribardi, Gjergj Shurbi, Kola Zhari, and Dom Miho.
