= Andreozzi =

Andreozzi is an Italian surname, derived from the given name Andrea. Notable people with the surname include:

- Alessandro Andreozzi (born 1991), Italian motorcycle racer
- Guido Andreozzi (born 1991), Argentine tennis player
- Silvestro Andreozzi (1575–1648), Roman Catholic prelate who served as Bishop of Penne e Atri (1621–1648)
