= Constanța (disambiguation) =

Constanța may refer to:

== Places ==
- Constanța, a city in Romania

== People ==
- Constanța Burcică
- Constanța Hodoș
- Constanța Marino-Moscu

== See also ==
- Constantia (disambiguation)
