= Francesco Cuccarese =

Italian Roman Catholic archbishop (1930–2025)

His Excellency Francesco Cuccarese
- Archbishop Emeritus of Pescara-Penne
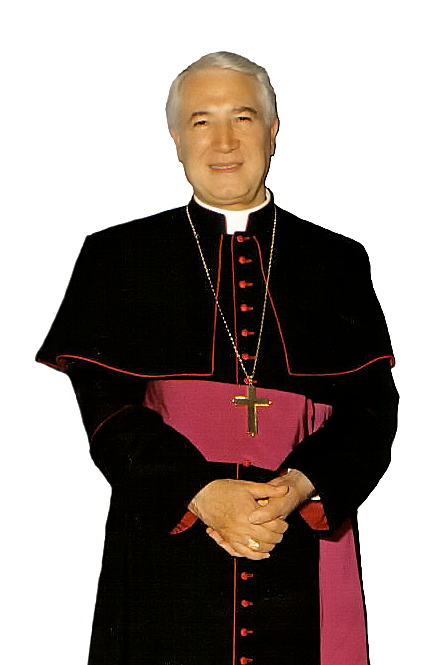
- Archdiocese: Pescara-Penne
- Appointed: 21 April 1990
- Term ended: 4 November 2005
- Predecessor: Antonio Iannucci
- Successor: Tommaso Valentinetti
- Previous posts: Archbishop of Acerenza (1979–1987); Archbishop of Caserta (Personal title) (1987–1990)

Orders
- Ordination: 19 July 1953 by Pasquale Quaremba
- Consecration: 1 April 1979 by Sebastiano Baggio

Personal details
- Born: 8 March 1930 Tursi, Italy
- Died: 11 March 2025 (aged 95) Rome, Italy

Francesco Cuccarese (8 March 1930 – 11 March 2025) was an Italian prelate of the Roman Catholic Church.

== Biography ==
Born in Tursi, Cuccarese was ordained to the priesthood in 1953. He was appointed archbishop of Acerenza in 1979. He later served as bishop of Caserta, and given the personal title of archbishop, from 1987 to 1990, when he was appointed archbishop of Pescara-Penne. He served until his retirement in 2005.

Cuccarese died in Rome on 11 March 2025, at the age of 95.

Catholic Church titles
Preceded by Antonio Iannucci	Archbishop of Pescara-Penne; 1990–2005	Succeeded by Tommaso Valentinetti
Preceded by Vito Roberti	Archbishop of Caserta; 1987–1990	Succeeded by Raffaele Nogaro
Preceded by Giuseppe Vairo	Archbishop of Acerenza; 1979–1987	Succeeded by Michele Scandiffio
