= Giorgio Lazzari =

Most Reverend Giorgio Lazzari
- Bishop of Minori
- Church: Catholic Church
- Diocese: Diocese of Minori
- In office: 1604–1615
- Predecessor: Tommaso Zerula
- Successor: Tommaso Brandolini

Orders
- Consecration: 8 August 1604 by Girolamo Bernerio

Personal details
- Born: 1564 Tarvisan
- Died: 1615 (age 51) Minori, Italy

Giorgio Lazzari (1564–1615) was a Roman Catholic prelate who served as Bishop of Minori (1604–1615).

== Biography ==
Giorgio Lazzari was born in Tarvisan in 1564 and ordained a priest in the Order of Preachers. On 19 July 1604, he was appointed during the papacy of Pope Clement VIII as Bishop of Minori. On 8 August 1604, he was consecrated bishop by Girolamo Bernerio, Cardinal-Bishop of Albano, with Agostino Quinzio, Bishop of Korčula, and Diodato Gentile, Bishop of Caserta, serving as co-consecrators. He served as Bishop of Minori until his death in 1615.

== External links and additional sources ==
- Cheney, David M. "Diocese of Minori". Catholic-Hierarchy.org. (for Chronology of Bishops) ^{[self-published]}
- Chow, Gabriel. "Titular Episcopal See of Minori (Italy)". GCatholic.org. (for Chronology of Bishops) ^{[self-published]}

Catholic Church titles
Preceded by Tommaso Zerula	Bishop of Minori; 1604–1615	Succeeded by Tommaso Brandolini
