= Carlo Carafa (bishop of Aversa) =

Bishop of Aversa

Most Reverend Carlo Carafa
- Bishop of Aversa
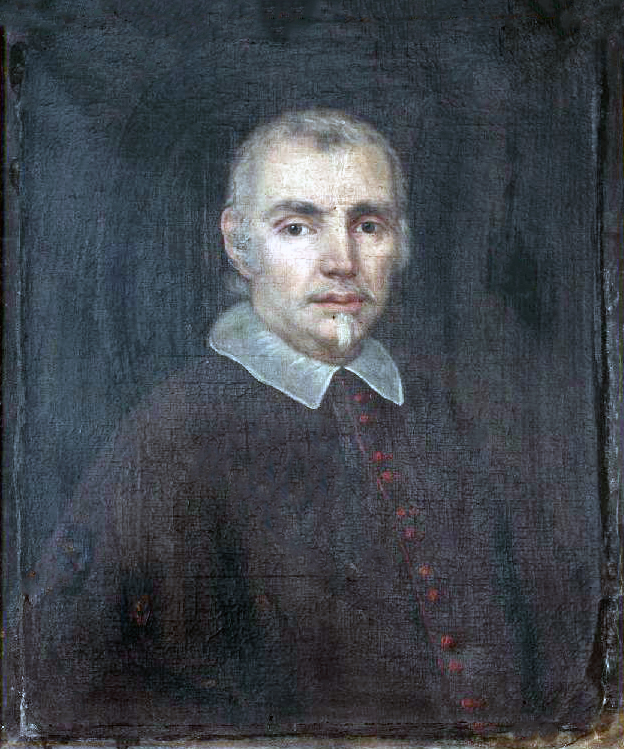
- Church: Catholic Church
- Diocese: Diocese of Aversa
- In office: 1616–1644
- Predecessor: Filippo Spinelli
- Successor: Carlo Carafa della Spina
- Previous post: Apostolic Nuncio to Emperor (1621–1628)

Orders
- Consecration: 21 September 1616 by Giambattista Leni

Personal details
- Born: 1584 Naples, Italy
- Died: April 1644 (age 60) Aversa, Italy

Carlo Carafa (1584–1644) was a Roman Catholic prelate who served as Bishop of Aversa (1616–1644) and Apostolic Nuncio to Emperor (1621–1628).

== Biography ==
Carlo Carafa was born in Naples, Italy in 1584. On 19 July 1616, he was appointed during the papacy of Pope Paul V as Bishop of Aversa. On 21 September 1616, he was consecrated bishop by Giambattista Leni, Bishop of Ferrara, with Galeazzo Sanvitale, Archbishop Emeritus of Bari-Canosa, and Antonio Díaz (bishop), Bishop of Caserta, serving as co-consecrators. On 17 April 1621, he was appointed Apostolic Nuncio to Ferdinand II, Holy Roman Emperor, by Pope Gregory XV, where he served until his resignation on 9 Sep 1628. He served as Bishop of Aversa until his death in April 1644.

== Episcopal succession ==
While bishop, he was the principal co-consecrator of:

- Miguel Juan Balaguer Camarasa, Bishop of Malta (1635);
- Domenico Ravenna, Bishop of Nicastro (1635);
- Luigi Pappacoda, Bishop of Capaccio (1635); and
- Marco Morosini, Bishop of Treviso (1639).

== External links and additional sources ==
- Cheney, David M. "Nunciature to Emperor (Germany)". Catholic-Hierarchy.org. (for Chronology of Bishops) ^{[self-published]}
- Cheney, David M. "Diocese of Aversa". Catholic-Hierarchy.org. (for Chronology of Bishops) ^{[self-published]}
- Chow, Gabriel. "Diocese of Aversa (Italy)". GCatholic.org. (for Chronology of Bishops) ^{[self-published]}

Catholic Church titles
Preceded by Ascanio Gesualdo	Apostolic Nuncio to Emperor; 1621–1628	Succeeded by Giovanni Battista Maria Pallotta
Preceded by Filippo Spinelli	Bishop of Aversa; 1616–1644	Succeeded by Carlo Carafa della Spina
