= Diocese of Constantia in Scythia =

Roman Catholic titular see in Romania

See Constantia for namesakes

The Diocese of Constantia (in Scythia) is a former bishopric and present Latin Catholic titular see.

The diocese once had its episcopal see in present Constanța (capital of the Romanian part of Dobruja region by the Black Sea), Constantia (in Scythia) in Latin, Κωνστάντια in Greek, which is Ancient Tomis, until the Byzantines renamed it. It faded.

== Titular see ==
The diocese was nominally restored (late 19th century?) as Titular archbishopric of Constantia antea Tomi in Latin or Costanza di Scizia in Curiate Italian, in 1925 renamed as Titular archbishopric of Constantia (Latin) or Costanza di Scizia (Italian)

In 1926 it was demoted as Titular bishopric of Constantia in Latin or Costanza di Scizia in Italian), but in 1929 again promoted as Titular archbishopric and given the additional Latin name Tomi (after pre-Byzantine Tomis), and in 1933 renamed as Tomi in Latin, Costanza di Scizia or Tomi in Italian.

In 1990 renamed as Titular archbishopric of Constantia in Scythia (Latin), Costanza di Scizia or Tomi in Italian.

It is vacant, having had the following incumbents, all of (now fitting) intermediate (non-Metropolitan) archiepiscopal rank :

- John Baptist Salpointe (1894.01.21 – 1898.07.15)
- Nicolae Iosif Camilli, Conventual Friars Minor (O.F.M. Conv.) (1901.03.27 – 1904.08.30)
- Vito Roberti (1962.10.13 – 1965.08.15)
- William Henry O'Connell (1906.02.21 – 1907.08.31) (later Cardinal)
- Domenico Taccone-Gallucci (1908.07.21 – 1917.10.09)
- Pietro Pisani (1919.12.15 – 1960.02.16)
- Edmond John Fitzmaurice (1960.03.02 – 1962.07.25)

== Also ==
- Scythia Minor

== Sources and external links ==
- GCatholic
