= Vito Roberti =

Italian bishop (1911–1998)

- (Arch)Bishop of Caserta
- Church: Catholic Church
- Diocese: Diocese of Caserta
- In office: 15 August 1965 – 6 June 1987
- Predecessor: Bartolomeo Mangino
- Successor: Francesco Cuccarese
- Previous posts: Apostolic Nuncio to Rwanda (1964-1965); Apostolic Nuncio to the Democratic Republic of the Congo & Burundi (1963-1965); Titular Archbishop of Constantia in Scythia (1962-1965); Apostolic Delegate to Rwanda (1962-1964); Apostolic Delegate to Belgian Congo (1962-1963)

Orders
- Ordination: 23 December 1933
- Consecration: 2 December 1962 by Amleto Giovanni Cicognani

Personal details
- Born: 12 September 1911 Matera, Province of Potenza, Kingdom of Italy
- Died: 31 August 1998 (aged 86)

Vito Roberti (12 September 1911 – 31 August 1998) was an Italian prelate of the Catholic Church who was Bishop of Caserta from 1965 to 1987. He was given the personal title of archbishop in 1962 and worked from 1962 to 1965 in the diplomatic service of the Holy See as Apostolic Nuncio to several countries in Africa.

== Biography ==
Vito Roberti was born on 11 September 1911 in Matera, Italy. He was ordained a priest on 23 December 1933. In 1950 he joined the staff of the Congregation for Extraordinary Ecclesiastical Affairs.

On 13 October 1962, Pope John XXIII named him titular archbishop of Constantia in Scythia and Apostolic Delegate to the Democratic Republic of the Congo and to Rwanda. His title in each of those positions changed promptly to Apostolic Nuncio, in the Congo on 16 February 1963 and in Rwanda on 6 June 1964. He received his episcopal consecration on 2 December 1962 from Cardinal Amleto Cicognani.

On 11 February 1963, Pope John gave him the additional responsibility of Apostolic Nuncio to Burundi.

On 15 August 1965, Pope Paul ended his diplomatic career, appointing him Bishop of Caserta with the personal title of Archbishop. On 29 May 1967, Pope Paul named him Apostolic Administrator of the Diocese of Alife, a position he held until 1978.

Pope John Paul II appointed his successor in Caserta on 6 June 1987 when he was 75.

He died on 31 August 1998.
