= Raffaele Nogaro =

Italian Roman Catholic prelate (1933–2026)

The Most Reverend Raffaele Nogaro
- Bishop of Caserta
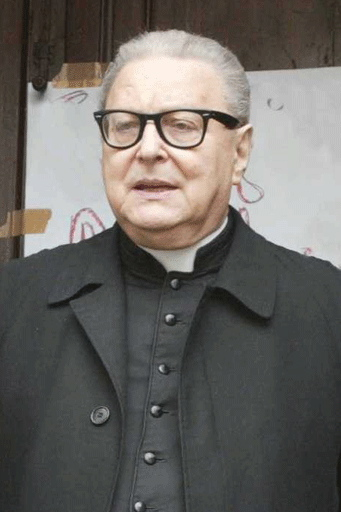
- Archdiocese: Naples
- Diocese: Caserta
- Appointed: 20 October 1990
- Term ended: 25 April 2009
- Predecessor: Francesco Cuccarese
- Successor: Pietro Farina
- Previous post: Bishop of Sessa Aurunca (1982–1990)

Orders
- Ordination: 29 June 1958 by Giuseppe Zaffonato
- Consecration: 9 January 1983 by Alfredo Battisti, Emilio Pizzoni, Vittorio Maria Costantini

Personal details
- Born: 31 December 1933 Gradisca d'Isonzo, Italy
- Died: 6 January 2026 (aged 92) Caserta, Italy
- Coat of arms

Raffaele Nogaro (31 December 1933 – 6 January 2026) was an Italian Roman Catholic prelate.

Nogaro was born in Gradisca, Sedegliano, on 31 December 1933. On 29 June 1958 he was ordained a priest at Udine Cathedral by Archbishop Giuseppe Zaffonato.

On 25 October 1982, Pope John Paul II appointed him Bishop of Sessa Aurunca; he succeeded Vittorio Maria Costantini, who had resigned due to reacheding the age limit. On 9 January 1983, he received episcopal ordination at the cathedral in Udine from Archbishop Alfredo Battisti, the co-consecrating bishops were Emilio Pizzoni and Vittorio Maria Costantini. On 20 October 1990, he was transferred to the Diocese of Caserta, where he succeeded Archbishop Francesco Cuccarese.

On 25 April 2009, Pope Benedict XVI accepted his resignation, presented upon reaching the age limit, from the pastoral care of the Diocese of Caserta; he was succeeded by Pietro Farina.

Nogaro died on 6 January 2026 at the age of 92.

Catholic Church titles
Preceded by Francesco Cuccarese	Bishop of Caserta; 1990–2009	Succeeded by Pietro Farina
Preceded by Vittorio Maria Costantini	Bishop of Sessa Aurunca; 1982–1990	Succeeded by Agostino Superbo
