= Antonio Iannucci =

Italian archbishop (1914–2008)

- Archbishop of Archdiocese of Pescara-Penne
- Church: Roman Catholic Church
- See: Archdiocese of Pescara-Penne
- In office: 1959–1990
- Predecessor: Benedetto Falcucci
- Successor: Francesco Cuccareset
- Previous post(s): Titular Bishop of Hadriania

Orders
- Ordination: 25 March 1938
- Consecration: by Cardinal Adeodato Piazza

Personal details
- Born: 13 June 1914; Bolognano, Italy
- Died: 14 October 2008 (aged 94); Pescara, Italy

Antonio Iannucci (13 June 1914 – 14 October 2008) was an Italian prelate of the Roman Catholic Church.

== Early life ==
Iannucci was born in Bolognano, Italy, in 1914 and was ordained a priest on 25 March 1938.

== Career ==
He was appointed as an auxiliary bishop of the Archdiocese of Pescara-Penne on 20 March 1955, and consecrated on 8 May 1955. The principal consecrator for Bishop Iannucci was Cardinal Adeodato Giovanni Piazza, O.C.D who also consecrated American Bishop Fulton J. Sheen. On 16 February 1959, Iannucci was appointed bishop of the Archdiocese of Pescara-Penne. Archbishop Iannucci retired from the position on 21 April 1990.

Iannucci was the titular bishop of Hadriania from 1955 to 1959. Bishop Iannucci participated as a Council Father during the Second Vatican Council which took place from 1962 to 1965. He was one of 2,625 people to participate in Vatican II. He attended all four sessions of the Second Vatican Council. Antonio Iannucci was a priest for 70.5 years and a Catholic bishop for 53.4 years.

== Death ==
He died in Pescara, Italy on 14 October 2008.

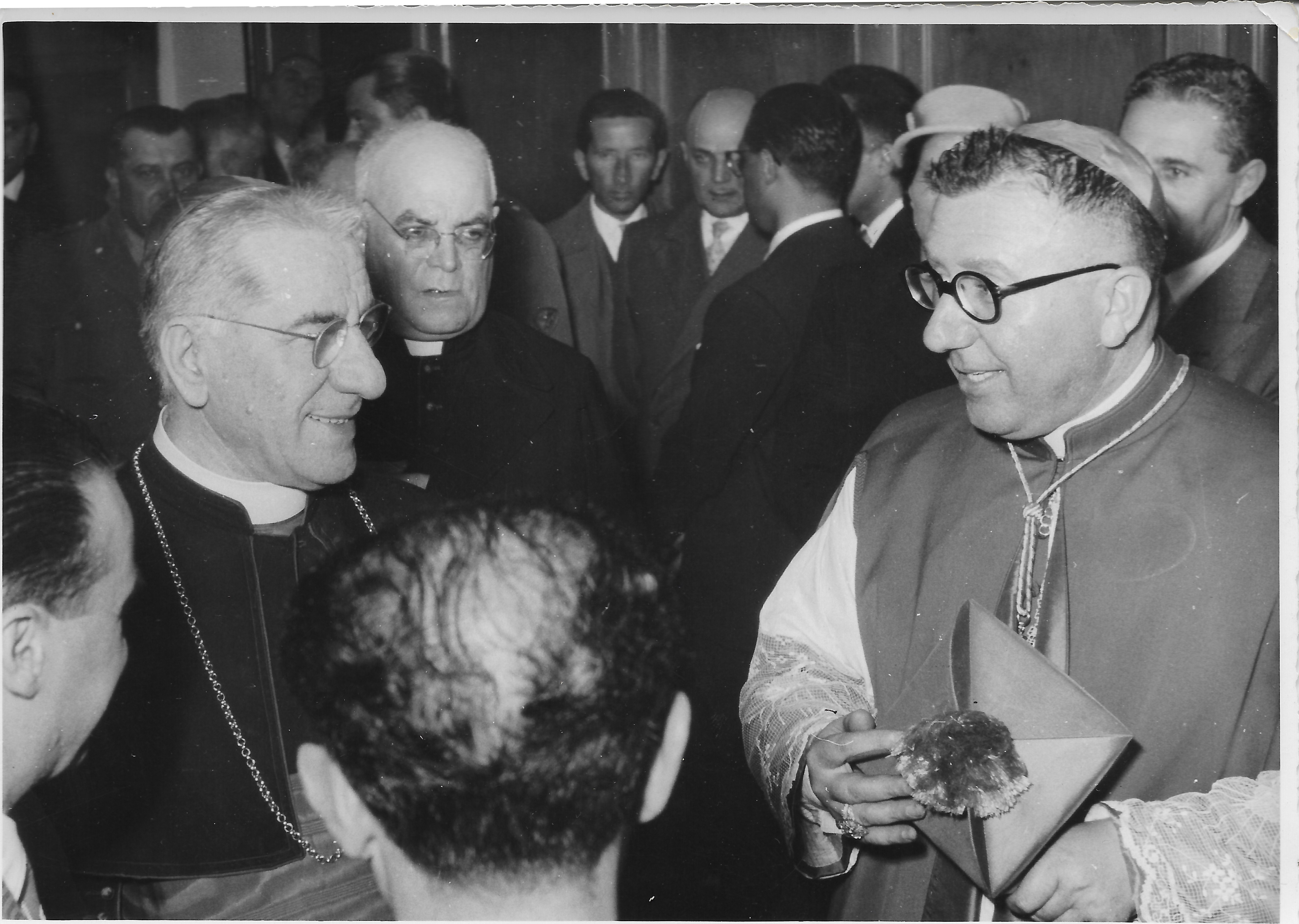
Consecration of Bishop Antonio Iannucci 1957

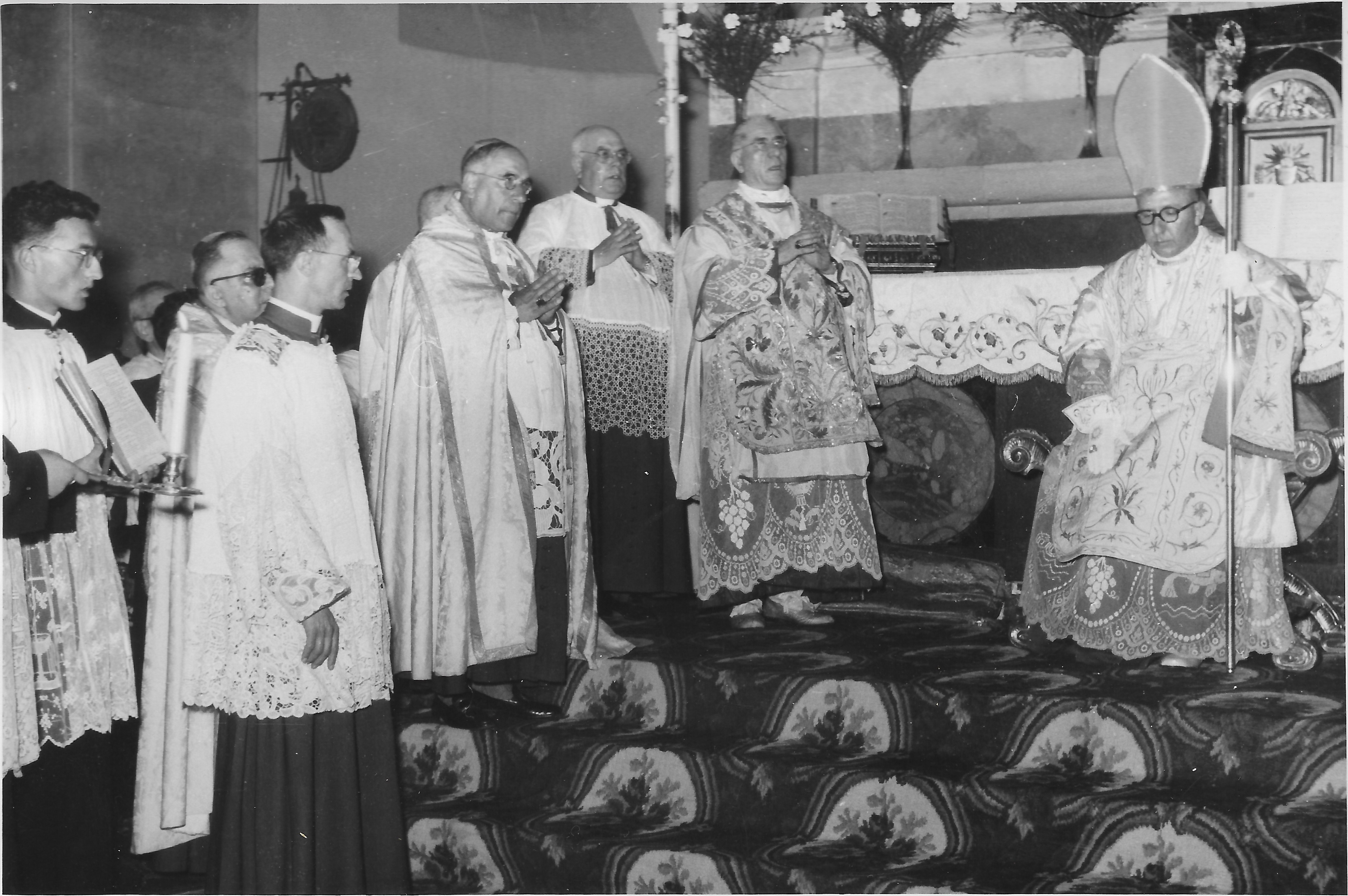
