= Giuseppe Spinucci =

17th-century Roman Catholic bishop

Most Reverend Giuseppe Spinucci
- Bishop of Penne e Atri
- Church: Catholic Church
- Diocese: Diocese of Penne e Atri
- In office: 1668–1695
- Predecessor: Esuperanzio Raffaelli
- Successor: Vincenzo Maria de Rossi

Orders
- Ordination: 6 Jan 1661
- Consecration: 21 May 1668 by Francesco Maria Brancaccio

Personal details
- Born: 1617 Fermo, Italy
- Died: 7 Dec 1695 (age 79)

Giuseppe Spinucci (1617–1695) was a Roman Catholic prelate who served as Bishop of Penne e Atri (1668–1695).

== Biography ==
Giuseppe Spinucci was born in Fermo, Italy in 1617 and ordained a priest on 6 Jan 1661. On 14 May 1668, he was appointed during the papacy of Pope Clement IX as Bishop of Penne e Atri. On 21 May 1668, he was consecrated bishop by Francesco Maria Brancaccio, Cardinal-Bishop of Frascati, with Stefano Brancaccio, Titular Archbishop of Hadrianopolis in Haemimonto, and Giuseppe della Corgna, Bishop of Orvieto, serving as co-consecrators. He served as Bishop of Penne e Atri until his death on 7 Dec 1695.

== External links and additional sources ==
- Cheney, David M. "Archdiocese of Pescara-Penne". Catholic-Hierarchy.org. (Chronology of Bishops) ^{[self-published]}
- Chow, Gabriel. "Metropolitan Archdiocese of Pescara-Penne". GCatholic.org. (Chronology of Bishops) ^{[self-published]}

Catholic Church titles
Preceded by Esuperanzio Raffaelli	Bishop of Penne e Atri; 1668–1695	Succeeded by Vincenzo Maria de Rossi
