= Diocese of Atri =

Diocese of the Catholic Church

The Diocese of Atri (Latin: Dioecesis Hatriensis seu Atriensis) was a Roman Catholic diocese located in the town of Atri in the modern civil Province of Teramo in the Abruzzo region of Italy. It was created in 1252 by order of Pope Innocent IV, and immediately united with the Diocese of Penne to form the Diocese of Penne e Atri. One single bishop held both dioceses, aeque personaliter, at the same time. The two dioceses were separated by order of Pope Pius XII on 1 July 1949. Atri was united, aeque principaliter, with the diocese of Teramo, and a new bishop of Teramo e Atri was appointed on 12 December 1949. The diocese was abolished completely on 30 September 1986, and its territory became part of the diocese of Teramo.

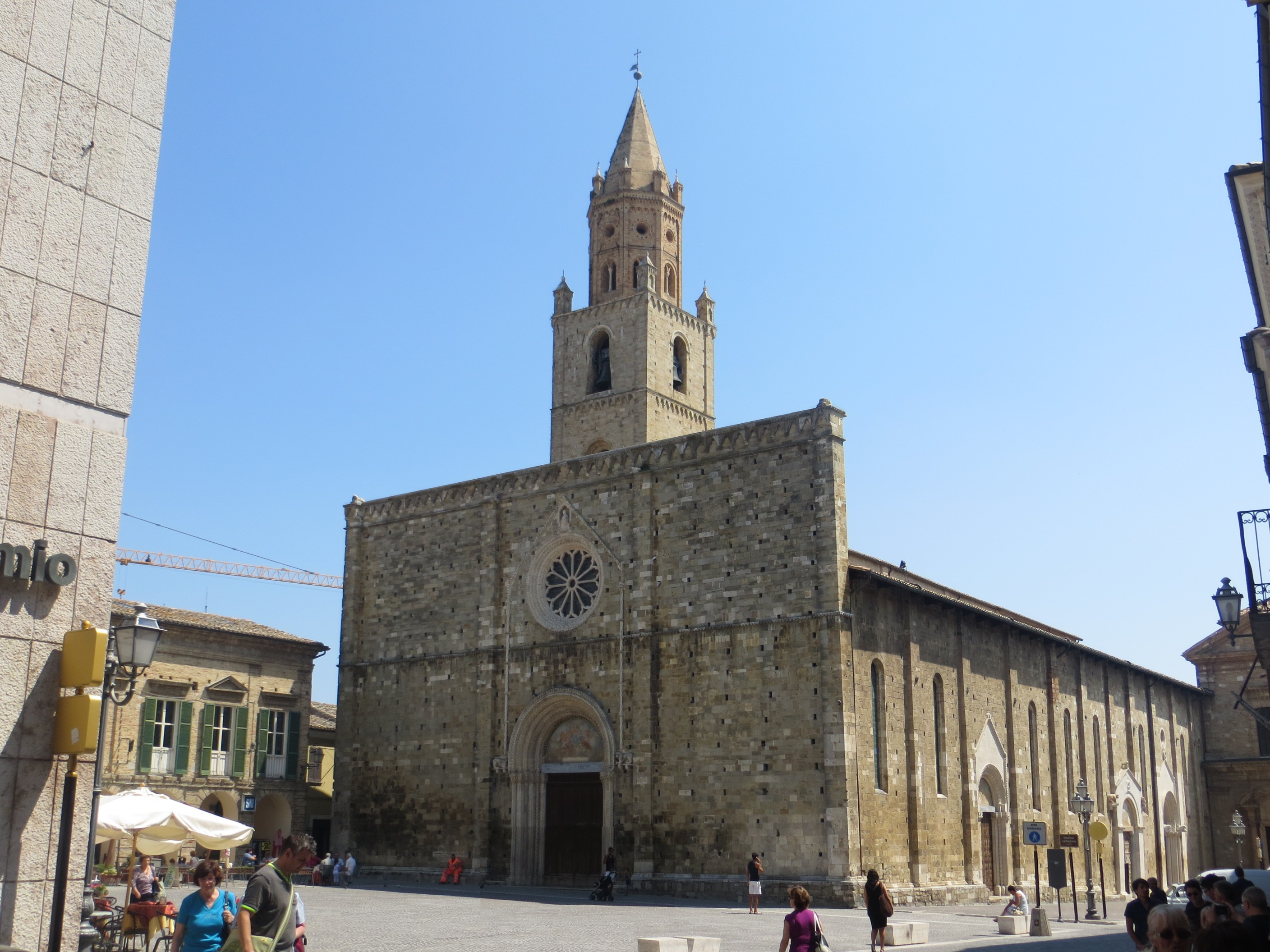
Co-cathedral of the Assumption, Atri

== History ==
After the death of King Roger II of Sicily in 1154, Atri was laid waste by Robert III, Count of Loritello and Count of Bassavilla, whose family then controlled the territory until the end of the 12th century. They were followed by the popes, the Hohenstaufen, and the Angevins. By 1195, power in Atri was in the hands of the Acquaviva family.

Cardinal Petrus Collemezzo, suburbicarian Bishop of Albano, acting on a mandate of Pope Innocent IV, made the decision that the place called Adria (Hadria, Hatria) should be raised to the status of a city, and that the church of S. Maria in Adria should become a cathedral; he then established the diocese of Atri. His acts were confirmed by Pope Innocent on 15 March 1252. In a letter to Bishop Beroaldus of Penne of 2 April 1252, Pope Innocent informed him that he was also bishop of the new diocese of Atri, and that he should treat the diocese of Adria as his spouse.

=== Chapter and cathedral ===
The cathedral of Atri is dedicated to the Assumption of the body of the Virgin Mary into heaven. The church that became the cathedral was already in existence in 1102. IT was consecrated as a cathedral in 1285.

After the diocese of Atri was established in 1252, the cathedral of Atri was staffed and administered by a corporation called the Chapter, composed of four dignities (the Archdeacon, the Archpriest, and two Primicerii) and sixteen other canons, with the addition of six minor canons called "Canonici S. Gregorii".

In electing a new bishop, the two Chapters of Canons of Penne and of Atri were to vote together as one body. The number of electors from each Chapter was to be the same, even if one Chapter had more members than the other. For the first round of voting, they could meet in one or the other cathedral, or in some mutually agreed upon place; in subsequent votes they were to meet alternately in Atri and Penne.

Following the death of Bishop Leonardus (1285–1302) at Atri, the Chapter of Atri sent notifications and special messengers several times to the Chapter of Penne and its individual members to assemble with them at a convenient place to elect a new bishop. Contrary to the statutes, the Chapter of Penne refused to meet with their colleagues, but proceeded to an election of their own, choosing Master John of Pontecorvo, a papal scriptor and chaplain of Cardinal Matteo Orsini. The Canons of Atri then gave notice that they would proceed to an election on an announced day, and when they met, they elected, by a vote of 19 to 1, Canon Bernardus of S. Pierre in Angers. When the electoral certificate was presented to the pope for confirmation, Canon Bernardus resigned the election into the hands of Pope Boniface VIII, who accepted the resignation. The pope then provided (appointed) Canon Bernardus the bishop of Penne and Atri, and ordered the Cardinal Bishop of Tusculum, Giovanni Boccamazzzi, to carry out the episcopal consecration.

=== Suffragan of Chieti ===
Both Penne and Atri were directly subject to the Holy See, until the establishment of the ecclesiastical province of Chieti in 1526 by Pope Clement VII (Medici). However, on 18 July 1539, Pope Paul III (Farnese), whose great-grandson Ottavio Farnese had become Duke of Penne, issued the bull "Inter Caetera", reversing the arrangement of Clement VII and making the diocese of Penne ed Atri again directly dependent upon the Holy See.

When a general reorganization of the dioceses of the Kingdom of the Two Sicilies took place in June 1818, the diocese of Penne ed Atri remained unchanged, directly subject to the papacy.

=== 20th century changes ===
By the mid-20th century, demographic changes had taken place in the Abruzzi which could not be ignored. Better transportation and increasing industrialization had lured people out of the inland valleys, with agriculture and animal husbandry as major occupations, to the cities. Pescara, a distance of 30 km (18 miles) from Penne, had become the largest city in the province, and the Italian Republic moved the provincial capital to the coastal town of Pescara. The Vatican took note, and felt obliged to follow suit by having the seat of a bishop in the capital of the province. Pescara presented a problem, however, since the city had been created out of two towns in two different dioceses, Chieti and Penne, while Atri's territory was within the boundaries of the civil province of Teramo. The diocese of Atri was therefore removed from the union with Penne, and transferred to the diocese of Teramo, aeque principaliter, that is, the bishop of Teramo was at the same time also bishop of Atri, and was to be called episcopus Theramensis et Hatriensis. The episcopal seat of the diocese of Penne was transferred to the new diocese of Pescara; the diocese was to be called Penne-Pescara.

A further change in the status of Atri was made in 1986, in order to conform to Italian civil law which was embodied in the Concordat between the Vatican and the Italian Republic of 18 February 1984. After extensive consultations, Pope John Paul II decreed that the status of the bishop governing several dioceses aeque personaliter was abolished, as was the case with Teramo and Atri; and that the diocese of Atri was therefore merged with the diocese of Teramo to form a single diocese. The changes were embodied in a decree of the Sacred Congregation of Bishops in the Roman Curia, promulgated on 30 September 1986. The seat of the merged dioceses was to be in Teramo, and the official name of the diocese was to be "Dioecesis Aprutina-Hatriensis". The diocesan offices (curia) was to be in Teramo, as was the diocesan tribunal, the diocesan seminary, the College of Consultors, and the Priests' Council, unless otherwise directed by the bishop. The cathedral in Atri was renamed a co-cathedral.

== See also ==
- Roman Catholic Archdiocese of Pescara-Penne#Diocese of Penne e Atri: List of bishops of Penne ed Atri
- Roman Catholic Archdiocese of Chieti-Vasto
- Roman Catholic Archdiocese of Pescara-Penne
- Catholic Church in Italy

== Sources ==
- Bindi, Vincenzo (1889). Monumenti storici ed artistici degli Abruzzi: studi (in Italian). Avezzano: Studio bibliografico A. Polla, 1889.
- Cappelletti, Giuseppe (1870). Le chiese d'Italia dalla loro origine sino ai nostri giorni (in Italian). Vol. vigesimoprimo (21). Venezia: Antonelli. pp. 443–448.
- Eubel, Conradus, ed. (1913). Hierarchia catholica (in Latin). Vol. 1 (Tomus I) (second ed.). Münster: Libreria Regensbergiana.
- Kehr, Paul Fridolin (1909). Italia pontificia Vol. IV (Berlin: Weidmann 1909), pp. 283–309. (in Latin)
- Sorricchio, Luigi (1897). "Notizie storiche ed artistiche intorno alia cattedrale di Atri," (in Italian), in: Rivista Abruzzese di scienze, lettere ed arti Vol. XII (1897), pp. 1–9.
- Ughelli, Ferdinando; Coleti, Niccolò (1717). Italia sacra, sive De Episcopis Italiae (in Latin). Vol. I (Tomus primus) (secunda ed.). Venice: apud Sebastianum Coleti. pp. 1111–1153.
