= Archdiocese of Pescara-Penne =

Latin Catholic archdiocese in Italy

Coordinates: 42.9167°N 12.9000°E

Archdiocese of Pescara-Penne Archidioecesis Piscariensis-Pinnensis

Catholic
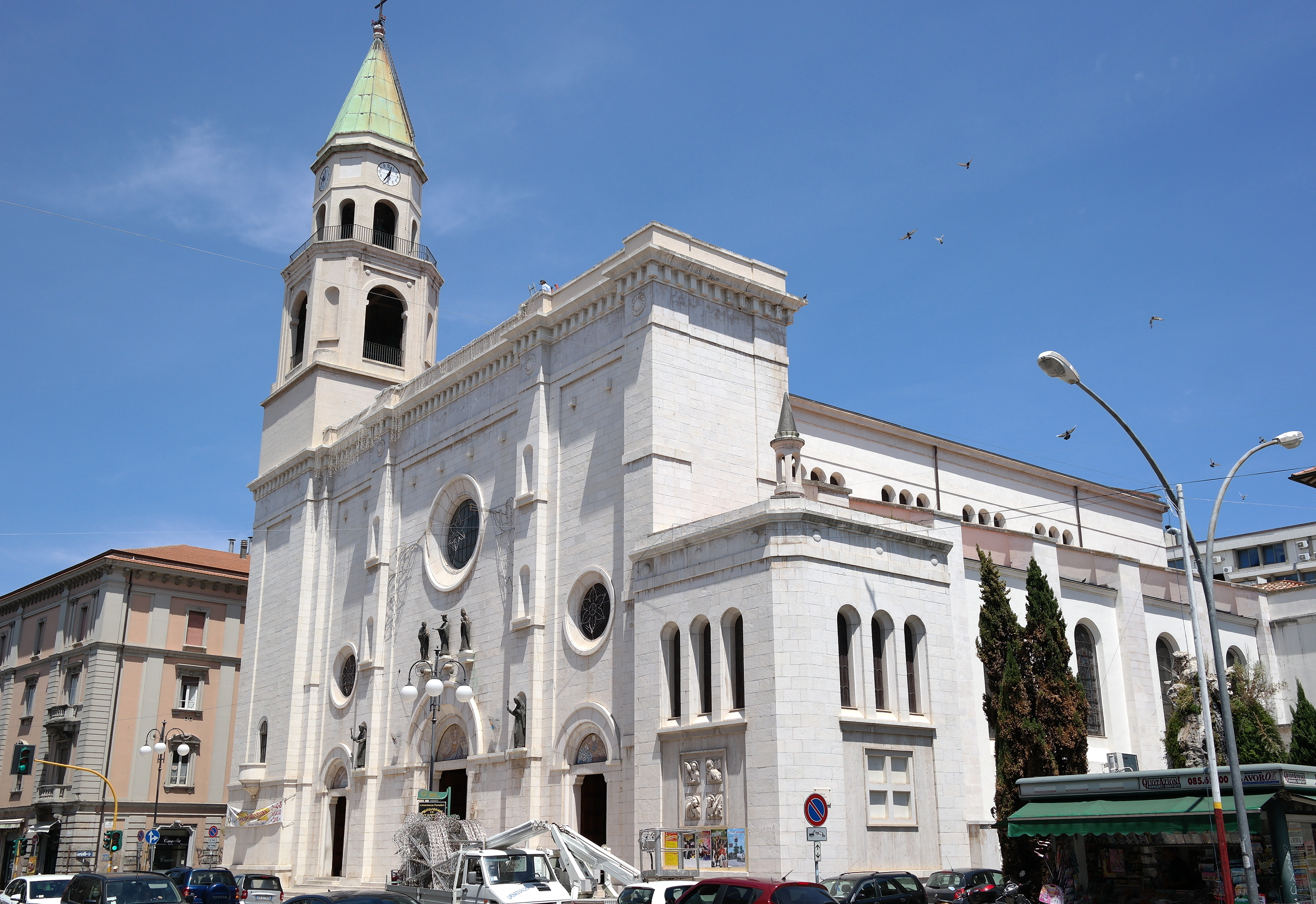
- Pescara Cathedral

Location
- Country: Italy
- Ecclesiastical province: Pescara-Penne

Statistics
- Area: 1,600 km^{2} (620 sq mi)
- Population: Total; Catholics: (as of 2023); 299,800 (est.) ▼; 285,900 (guess) ▼
- Parishes: 123

Information
- Denomination: Catholic Church
- Sui iuris church: Latin Church
- Rite: Roman Rite
- Established: 5th century
- Cathedral: Cattedrale di S. Cetteo Vescovo e Martire (Pescara)
- Co-cathedral: Concattedrale di S. Massimo (Penne)
- Secular priests: 112 (diocesan); 40 (Religious Orders) ▼25 Permanent Deacons ▲

Current leadership
- Pope: Leo XIV
- Archbishop: Tommaso Valentinetti

Map
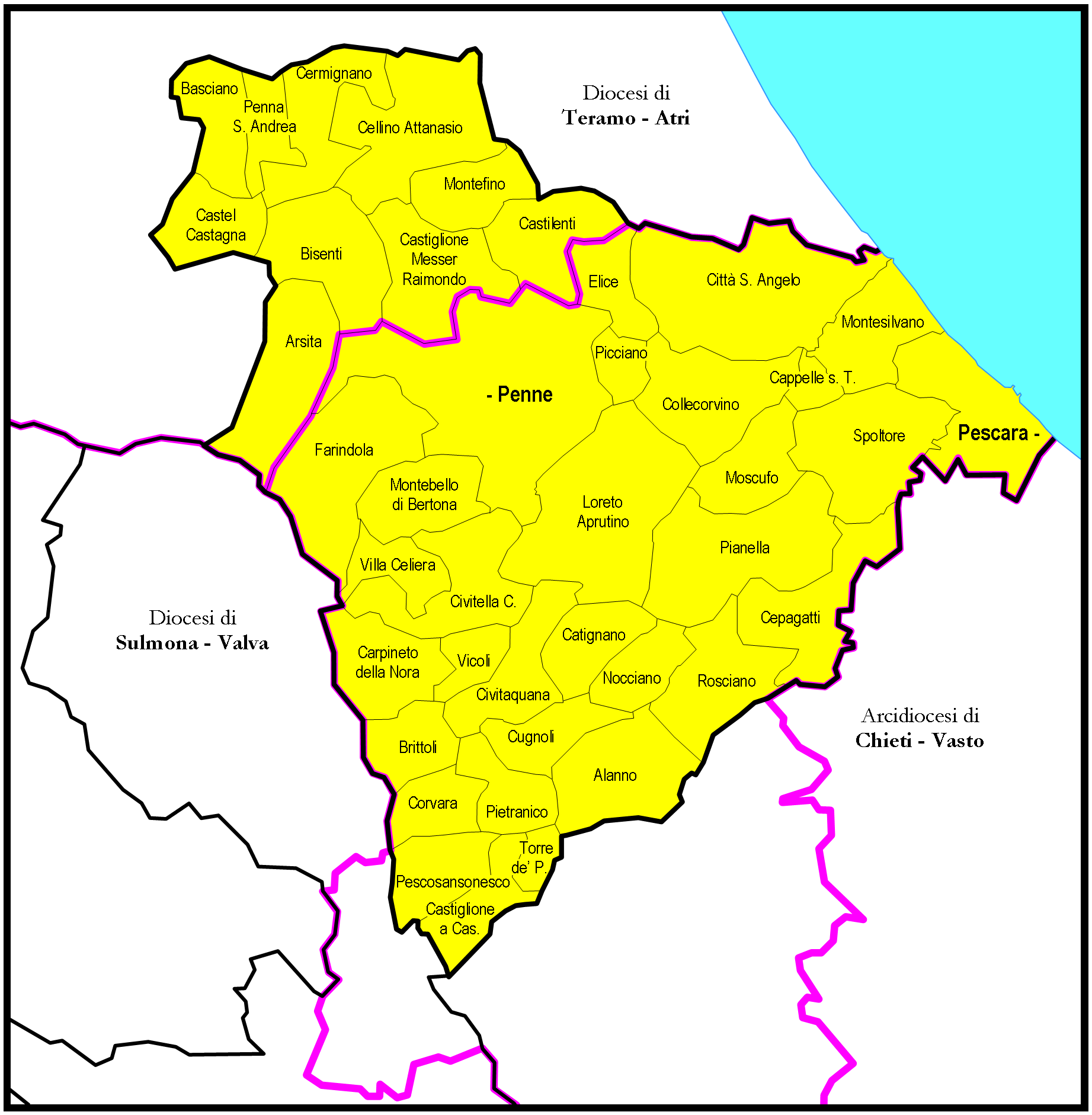

Website
- www.diocesipescara.it

The Archdiocese of Pescara-Penne (Latin: Archidioecesis Piscariensis-Pinnensis) is a Latin Church diocese of the Catholic Church on the east coast in central Italy.

It was promoted to the status of metropolitan archbishopric in 1982, and its name was changed from the Diocese of Penne e Pescara to Pescara-Penne. That was in turn created in 1949, when the historic diocese of Penne-Atri was split up, with Atri going to form the Diocese of Teramo-Atri. The Diocese of Atri had been united with the Diocese of Penne in 1252.

The seat of the archbishops is in the Pescara Cathedral.

== History ==
The diocese of Penne was always immediately subject to the Holy See (Papacy), except for the period 1526 to 1539, when it was subject to the archbishop of Chieti.

The diocese of Atri (Adriensis) was established by Cardinal Petrus Capoccius, Cardinal Deacon of S. Giorgio ad velum aureum, Legate of the Marches, under authority of Pope Innocent IV, on 1 April 1251 by the Bull Solet S. Mater. He appointed the church of S. Maria to be the new cathedral. In a letter to the people of Atri of 21 August 1251, Pope Innocent thanked them for their support against the attacks of the Emperor Frederick II. On 15 March 1252, the Pope united the diocese of Atri and the diocese of Penne in the person of one and the same bishop, aequaliter et personaliter.

In 1927, Pescara became the capital of a new province of the Italian state. On 2 June 1946, a plebiscite of the Italian peoples abolished the monarchy and established a republic. On 1 January 1948, the new constitution of the Italian Republic went into effect. The political changes had a notable effect on the arrangement of the ecclesiastical provinces in the Abruzzi, as Pope Pius XII was well aware. He was especially concerned about the substantial movement of population to Pescara in the first half of the 20th century, and the decision of the Italian government, partially due to destruction of parts of the area during the military operations of World War II, to direct its resources toward the rebuilding and improvement of Pescara. As the capital of a province, Pescara might be expected to become the seat of a bishop; but the city extended over two different dioceses, Chieti and Penne. The Pope, therefore decided on the rearrangement of the diocesan system, which he effected in the Bull Dioecesium subscriptiones of 1 July 1949.

First of all, the Bull brought together all of the parishes of the city of Pescara, by transferring five parishes from the diocese of Chieti to the diocese of Penne. Second, the seat of the diocese of Penne was transferred from Penne. to the city of Pescara, and its name changed to Pinnensis-Piscarensis. Third, the parish of S. Cetteo in Pescara was elevated to the status of a cathedral, and the Chapter of the cathedral of Penne was transferred to S. Cetteo; the Archpriest of the Chapter was to be the parish priest of the cathedral. The cathedral in Penne was named a co-cathedral. The diocesan seminary was transferred to Pescara. Since the diocese of Atri was entirely in the civil province of Teramo, Atri was united aequaliter principaliter with the diocese of Teramo, forming the diocese of Teramo e Atri.

Pope John Paul II made additional changes in the ecclesiastical structure of the Abruzzi. In the Bull Ad majorem quidam of 2 March 1982, he created a new ecclesiastical province, and named the bishop of Penne-Pescara as the metropolitan archbishop. He assigned the diocese of Teramo e Altri, which had been immediately subject to the Holy See (Papacy), as a suffragan of the new archdiocese. He also changed the name of the archdiocese from Penne-Pescara to Pescara-Penne. These changes divested the Papacy of the direct control of two more dioceses.

=== Cathedral and Chapter ===
When the diocese of Atri was established in 1251, the number of Canons in the Chapter of the cathedral was fixed at twenty secular Canons. In electing a new bishop, the two Chapters of Canons were to vote together as one body. The number of electors from each Chapter was to be the same, even if one Chapter had more members than the other. For the first round of voting, they could meet in one or the other cathedral, or in some mutually agreed upon place; in subsequent votes they were to meet alternately in Atri and Penne.

A document of 4 January 1252 mentions that among the dignities of the Chapter of Penne were the Primicerius and the Archpriest. Another, of 26 January 1260, names the Archdeacon, the Archpriest of civitas S. Angeli, the Archpriest of Monte Silvano, and two Primicerii; it also states that there were sixteen Canons of Penne.

In 1698, the city of Penne had a population of c. 4000 persons, and its Cathedral Chapter was composed of three dignities and fourteen Canons. The city of Atri had a population of c. 6000 persons, and its Cathedral Chapter was composed of four dignities and twenty Canons. In 1755, there were three dignities and twelve Canons in Penne, and four dignities and sixteen Canons in Atri.

Bishop Tommaso Balbani (1599–1621) held a diocesan synod in 1599. Bishop Giuseppe Spinucci (1668–1695) held a diocesan synod in the cathedral of Penne in November 1681.

== Bishops ==
=== Diocese of Penne ===
[Romanus (499)]
...

- Amadeus (attested 817, 844)

...

- Giraldus (attested 868)
- Helmoinus (872–879)

...

- Joannes (attested 953–990)

...

- Joannes (attested 1059)

...

- Pampo (attested 1070)

...

- Heribertus (attested 1111)
- Grimaldus (before 1118–after 1153)

...

- Oderisius (before 1169 – after 1190)
- Oddo (1194–1199)
- Anastasius Venantii (attested 1215)
- Gualterius, O.S.B. (attested 1216, 1220)

=== Diocese of Penne e Atri ===
United: 15 March 1252 with the Diocese of Atri

- Beroaldus (1252–c.1263)
- Gualterius (1264–1268)
- Beroaldus (1268–1285)
- Leonardus (Cajus), O.S.M. (1285–1302)
- Bernardus (1302-1321)
- Raimundus (1321–1324)
- Guillaume de Saint-Victor (1324–1326) Bishop-elect
- Nicolaus, O.Cist. (1326–1352)
- Marco Ardinghelli, O.P. (1352–1360)
- Giojosus (1360–1370)
- Barnabo Malaspina (1374–1380)
- Agostino da Lanzano (1380–1390)
- Pietro Scaglia, O.P. (1391–1393)
- Antonius (1393–1413)
- Pietro de Castroveteri (1413–1415)
- Giacomo de Camplo Turco (1415–1419)
- Delfino Nanni Gozzadini (1420–1433)
- Giovanni de Polena (1433–1454)
- Jacobinus Benedicti (1454–1456)
- Amicus Bonamici (1456–1463)
- Antonio Probo (1463–1482)
- Troilo Agnesi (30 Oct 1482 – 17 Dec 1483 Appointed, Bishop of Telese o Cerreto Sannita)
- Matteo Giudici (17 Dec 1483 – 1495 Died)
- Giovanni Battista Cantalicio (1503–1514)
- Valentino Cantalicio (1515–1550)
- Leonello Cibo (Cybo) (1551–1554)
- Tommaso Contuberio (1554–1561)
- Giacomo Guidi (1561–1568 Resigned)
- Paolo Odescalchi (27 Feb 1568 – 1572 Resigned)
- Giambattista de Benedictis (5 Sep 1572 – 1591 Died)
- Orazio Montani (Montano) (20 Mar 1591 – 25 Nov 1598 Appointed, Archbishop of Arles)
- Tommasi Balbani (1599–1621)
- Silvestro Andreozzi (17 Mar 1621 – Jan 1648 Died)
- Francesco Massucci (18 May 1648 – Sep 1656 Died)
- Gaspare Borghi (Burgi) (15 Jan 1657 – Aug 1661 Died)
- Esuperanzio Raffaelli (21 Nov 1661 – 24 Mar 1668 Died)
- Giuseppe Spinucci (1668–1695)
- Vincenzo Maria de Rossi, O.F.M. Conv. (23 Jul 1696 – 10 Jun 1698 Died)
- Fabrizio Maffei (22 Dec 1698 – Jun 1723 Died)
- Francesco Antonio Bussolini, O.S.B. (27 Sep 1723 – 20 Mar 1746 Died)
- Innocenzo Gorgoni, O.S.B. (2 May 1746 – 13 Feb 1755 Resigned)
- Gennaro Perrelli (21 Jul 1755 – 27 May 1761 Died)
- Giuseppe Maria de Leone (25 Jan 1762 – 7 Apr 1779 Died)
- Bonaventura Calcagnini (12 Jul 1779 – 1797 Died)
- Nicola Francesco Franchi (26 Jun 1805 – Nov 1815 Died)
- Domenico Ricciardone (25 May 1818 – 24 Jul 1845 Died)
- Vincenzo d'Alfonso (12 Apr 1847 – 23 Dec 1880 Died)
- Luigi Martucci (23 Dec 1880 – 16 Dec 1889 Died)
- Giuseppe Morticelli (23 Jun 1890 – Feb 1905 Resigned)
- Raffaele Piras (6 Dec 1906 – 23 Aug 1911 Died)
- Carlo Pensa, O.Ss.C.A. (27 Aug 1912 – 16 Dec 1948 Died)

=== Diocese of Penne e Pescara ===
United 1 July 1949 with the Diocese of Teramo to form the Diocese of Teramo e Atri and then separated from the new entity to form the Diocese of Penne e Pescara
Latin Name: Pinnensis et Piscariensis
Immediately Subject to the Holy See

- Benedetto Falcucci (2 Jul 1949 – 1 Jan 1959 Resigned)
- Antonio Iannucci (15 Feb 1959 – 21 Apr 1990 Retired)

=== Archdiocese of Pescara-Penne ===
Name Changed: 2 March 1982
Latin Name: Piscariensis-Pinnensis
Metropolitan See

- Francesco Cuccarese (21 Apr 1990 – 4 Nov 2005 Retired)
- Tommaso Valentinetti (4 Nov 2005 – )

== See also ==
- Roman Catholic Diocese of Atri

== Bibliography ==
=== Reference works for bishops ===
- Gams, Pius Bonifatius (1873). Series episcoporum Ecclesiae catholicae: quotquot innotuerunt a beato Petro apostolo (in Latin). Ratisbon: Typis et Sumptibus Georgii Josephi Manz. pp. 911–912.
- Eubel, Conradus, ed. (1913). Hierarchia catholica (in Latin). Vol. Tomus 1 (second ed.). Münster: Libreria Regensbergiana. (in Latin)
- Eubel, Conradus, ed. (1914). Hierarchia catholica (in Latin). Vol. Tomus 2 (second ed.). Münster: Libreria Regensbergiana.
- Eubel, Conradus; Gulik, Guilelmus (1923). Hierarchia catholica (in Latin). Vol. Tomus 3 (second ed.). Münster: Libreria Regensbergiana.
- Gauchat, Patritius (Patrice) (1935). Hierarchia catholica. Vol. Tomus IV (1592-1667). Münster: Libraria Regensbergiana.
- Ritzler, Remigius; Sefrin, Pirminus (1952). Hierarchia catholica medii et recentis aevi. Vol. Tomus V (1667-1730). Patavii: Messagero di S. Antonio.
- Ritzler, Remigius; Sefrin, Pirminus (1958). Hierarchia catholica medii et recentis aevi. Vol. Tomus VI (1730-1799). Patavii: Messagero di S. Antonio.
- Ritzler, Remigius; Sefrin, Pirminus (1968). Hierarchia Catholica medii et recentioris aevi (in Latin). Vol. VII (1800–1846). Monasterii: Libreria Regensburgiana.
- Remigius Ritzler; Pirminus Sefrin (1978). Hierarchia catholica Medii et recentioris aevi (in Latin). Vol. VIII (1846–1903). Il Messaggero di S. Antonio.
- Pięta, Zenon (2002). Hierarchia catholica medii et recentioris aevi (in Latin). Vol. IX (1903–1922). Padua: Messagero di San Antonio. ISBN 978-88-250-1000-8.

=== Studies ===
- Cappelletti, Giuseppe (1870). Le chiese d'Italia (in Italian). Vol. vigesimoprimo (XXI). Venezia: G. Antonelli. pp. 443–448.
- Del Monte, Michele (2008). Episcopati e monasteri a Penne e in Abruzzo (secc. XII-XIV): esperienze storiografiche e storiche a confronto. Biblioteca di studi medievali e moderni., Sezione medievale, 4. (in Italian). Naples: Loffredo. ISBN 978-88-7564-281-5.
- Gentili, Vincenzo (1832). Quadro di citta di Penna, o Saggio storico-statistico su citta di Penna (in Italian). Napoli: Pe' tipi della Minerva.
- Kehr, Paul Fridolin (1909). Italia pontificia Vol. IV (Berlin: Weidmann 1909), pp. 283–309. (in Latin)
- Schwartz, Gerhard (1907). Die Besetzung der Bistümer Reichsitaliens unter den sächsischen und salischen Kaisern: mit den Listen der Bischöfe, 951-1122. Leipzig: B.G. Teubner. pp. 238–239. (in German)
- Ughelli, Ferdinando; Coleti, Niccolò (1717). Italia sacra, sive De Episcopis Italiae (in Latin). Vol. Tomus primus (secunda ed.). Venice: apud Sebastianum Coleti. pp. 1111–1153.

Attribution

- Herbermann, Charles, ed. (1913). "Diocese of Penne and Atri". Catholic Encyclopedia. New York: Robert Appleton Company.
