= Diodato Gentile =

Italian Roman Catholic prelate

Most Reverend Diodato Gentile
- Bishop of Caserta; Apostolic Nuncio to Naples
- Church: Catholic Church
- Diocese: Diocese of Caserta
- In office: 1604–1616
- Predecessor: Benedetto Mandina
- Successor: Antonio Díaz (bishop)
- Previous post: Apostolic Nuncio to Naples (1611–1616)

Orders
- Consecration: 1 August 1604 by Domenico Pinelli

Personal details
- Born: 1555 Genoa, Italy
- Died: April 1616 (age 61) Caserta, Italy

Diodato Gentile, O.P. (1555–1616) was a Roman Catholic prelate who served as Bishop of Caserta (1604–1616) and Apostolic Nuncio to Naples (1611–1616).

== Biography ==
Diodato Gentile was born in Genoa, Italy 1555 and ordained a priest in the Order of Preachers. On 9 July 1604, he was appointed during the papacy of Pope Clement VIII as Bishop of Caserta. On 1 August 1604, he was consecrated bishop by Domenico Pinelli, Cardinal-Bishop of Frascati, with Giuseppe Ferrerio, Archbishop of Urbino, and Agostino Quinzio, Bishop of Korčula, serving as co-consecrators. On 6 March 1611, he was appointed during the papacy of Pope Paul V as Apostolic Nuncio to Naples. He served as Bishop of Caserta and Apostolic Nuncio to Naples until his death in April 1616.

While bishop, he was the principal co-consecrator of Martius Andreucci, Bishop of Trogir (1604); and Giorgio Lazzari, Bishop of Minori (1604).

== External links and additional sources ==
- Cheney, David M. "Diocese of Caserta". Catholic-Hierarchy.org. (for Chronology of Bishops) ^{[self-published]}
- Chow, Gabriel. "Diocese of Caserta". GCatholic.org. (for Chronology of Bishops) ^{[self-published]}
- Cheney, David M. "Nunciature to Naples". Catholic-Hierarchy.org. (for Chronology of Bishops) ^{[self-published]}

Catholic Church titles
Preceded by Valeriano Muti	Apostolic Nuncio to Naples; 1611–1616	Succeeded by Paolo Emilio Filonardi
Preceded by Benedetto Mandina	Bishop of Caserta; 1604–1616	Succeeded by Antonio Díaz (bishop)
