= Arrigo Minerbi =

Italian sculptor

- Born: 10 February 1881; Ferrara, Italy
- Died: 9 May 1960 (aged 79)
- Known for: Sculpture

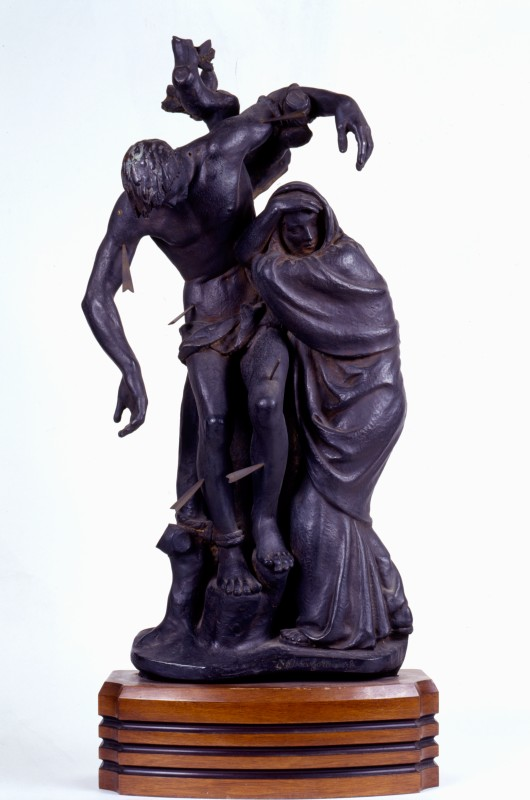
San Sebastiano, c. 1955 (Fondazione Cariplo)

Arrigo Minerbi (10 February 1881 – 9 May 1960) was an Italian sculptor.

== Life ==
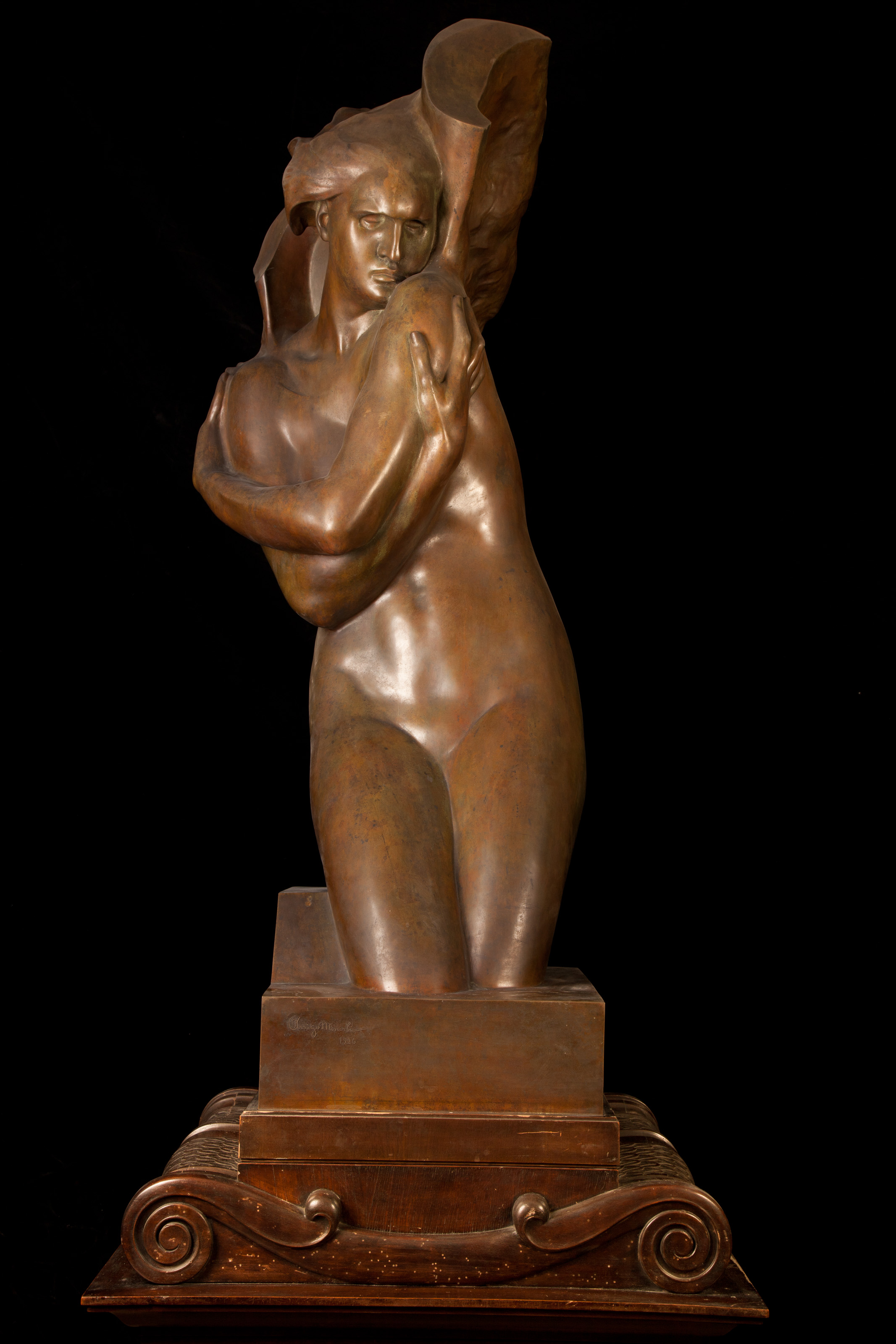
Arrigo Minerbi, La Vittoria del Piave (The Victory of the Piave), 1921, Museo nazionale della scienza e della tecnologia Leonardo da Vinci, Milan

Born to a Jewish family in Ferrara on 10 February 1881, he took a course in arts and crafts before working as a ceramicist, designer, teacher and stucco-artist in Florence, Ferrara and Genoa (in this period he produced a gigantic "Neptune" in iron and cement in 1910 at Monterosso al Mare, and other fountains in Genoa).

Aged 35 he moved to Milan where, in 1919, he put on an exhibition of his work to the critics and the public in the Galleria Pesaro. That exhibition also toured successfully to the 1920 Regionale di Ferrara, back to Milan in 1922 before going to the Primaverile Fiorentina that year, and finally being invited to the Venice Biennale, where he exhibited his silver group "Last Supper" (now in Oslo Cathedral). On 14 June 1925, in the Parco delle Rimembranze at Bondeno, he unveiled his "La Madre" as a monument to the dead of the First World War, for which he was later made an honorary citizen of Bondeno, though this was revoked by the promulgation of the Fascist race laws and only re-conferred in 2004.

Minerbi was the favourite artist of Gabriele D'Annunzio, for whom he produced "Luisa", a portrait of D'Annunzio's mother (as well as the tomb in the Chiesa di San Cetteo at Pescara, now Pescara Cathedral) and the bust of Eleonora Duse: both these portrait busts were exhibited at the Vittoriale degli Italiani of Gardone Riviera. In 1937 he was commissioned to produce the first (from the left) of five bronze doors for Milan Cathedral (on the theme of The Edict of Constantine), but he was subsequently forced into hiding at Gavazzana by racial persecution and only completed the doors in 1948.

== Works ==
- Self-portrait (1914, bronze, Galleria dell'Autoritratto a Firenze; marble, Galleria d'Arte Moderna in Ferrara);
- The Martyr (bust of Cesare Battisti, 1917, Castello del Buon Consiglio in Trento);
- The Victory of the Piave (1920, three bronze exemplars: Torre della Vittoria in Ferrara; Vittoriale degli Italiani in Gardone Riviera; cuggiono);
- Monument to Italian Doctors Fallen in War (1924, Chiostro della Sanità Militare in Florence);
- Mattino di Primavera (1929, Galleria d'Arte Moderna in Rome);
- Saint Francis preaching to the birds (1929, Tomba Cusini, Cimitero Monumentale in Milan);
- The Last Supper (1930, silver group, Oslo Cathedral),
- Luisa (bust of Gabriele D'Annunzio's mother, Vittoriale degli Italiani in Gardone Riviera);
- Eleonora Duse (bust, Vittoriale degli Italiani in Gardone Riviera);
- Tomb of Luisa D'Annunzio (1939, Pescara Cathedral);
- L'Assunta (1940, Chiesa delle Grazie, Milan);
- La Porta dell'editto di Costantino (1948, Milan Cathedral),
- Don Orione morente (1952, Rome),
- Madonna Salus Populi Romani (1953, Rome – Monte Mario)
- ungilded copy of the Madonna Salus Populi Romani (1954, East Boston – Don Orione Shrine)
