= Esuperanzio Raffaelli =

Roman catholic

Most Reverend Esuperanzio Raffaelli
- Bishop of Penne e Atri
- Church: Catholic Church
- Diocese: Diocese of Penne e Atri
- In office: 1661–1668
- Predecessor: Gaspare Borghi
- Successor: Giuseppe Spinucci

Orders
- Consecration: 30 November 1661 by Giulio Cesare Sacchetti

Personal details
- Died: 24 March 1668

Esuperanzio Raffaelli (died 24 March 1668) was a Roman Catholic prelate who served as Bishop of Penne e Atri (1661–1668).

== Biography ==
On 21 November 1661, Esuperanzio Raffaelli was appointed during the papacy of Pope Alexander VII as Bishop of Penne e Atri. On 30 November 1661, he was consecrated bishop by Giulio Cesare Sacchetti, Cardinal-Bishop of Sabina, with Ottaviano Carafa, Titular Archbishop of Patrae, and Emilio Bonaventura Altieri, Bishop of Camerino, serving as co-consecrators. He served as Bishop of Penne e Atri until his death on 24 March 1668.

== See also ==
- Catholic Church in Italy

== External links and additional sources ==
- Cheney, David M. "Archdiocese of Pescara-Penne". Catholic-Hierarchy.org. (Chronology of Bishops) ^{[self-published]}
- Chow, Gabriel. "Metropolitan Archdiocese of Pescara-Penne". GCatholic.org. (Chronology of Bishops) ^{[self-published]}

Catholic Church titles
Preceded by Gaspare Borghi	Bishop of Penne e Atri; 1661–1668	Succeeded by Giuseppe Spinucci
