= Francesco Massucci =

Most Reverend Francesco Massucci
- Bishop of Penne e Atri
- Church: Catholic Church
- Diocese: Diocese of Penne e Atri
- In office: 1648–1656
- Predecessor: Silvestro Andreozzi
- Successor: Gaspare Borghi

Orders
- Consecration: 1 June 1648 by Alfonso de la Cueva-Benavides y Mendoza-Carrillo

Personal details
- Born: 1610 Recanati, Italy
- Died: September 1656 (aged 45–46)

Francesco Massucci (1610 – September 1656) was a Roman Catholic prelate who served as Bishop of Penne e Atri (1610–1656).

== Biography ==
Francesco Massucci was born in Recanati, Italy in 1610. On 18 May 1648, he was appointed during the papacy of Pope Innocent X as Bishop of Penne e Atri. On 1 June 1648, he was consecrated bishop by Alfonso de la Cueva-Benavides y Mendoza-Carrillo, Cardinal-Bishop of Palestrina, with Giovanni Battista Scanaroli, Titular Bishop of Sidon, and Stefano Martini, Bishop of Noli, serving as co-consecrators. He served as Bishop of Penne e Atri until his death in September 1656.

== External links and additional sources ==
- Cheney, David M. "Archdiocese of Pescara-Penne". Catholic-Hierarchy.org. (Chronology of Bishops) ^{[self-published]}
- Chow, Gabriel. "Metropolitan Archdiocese of Pescara-Penne". GCatholic.org. (Chronology of Bishops) ^{[self-published]}

Catholic Church titles
Preceded by Silvestro Andreozzi	Bishop of Penne e Atri; 1648–1656	Succeeded by Gaspare Borghi
