= Antonio Díaz (bishop) =

Italian Roman Catholic prelate

Most Reverend Antonio Díaz
- Apostolic Nuncio to Naples; Bishop Emeritus of Caserta
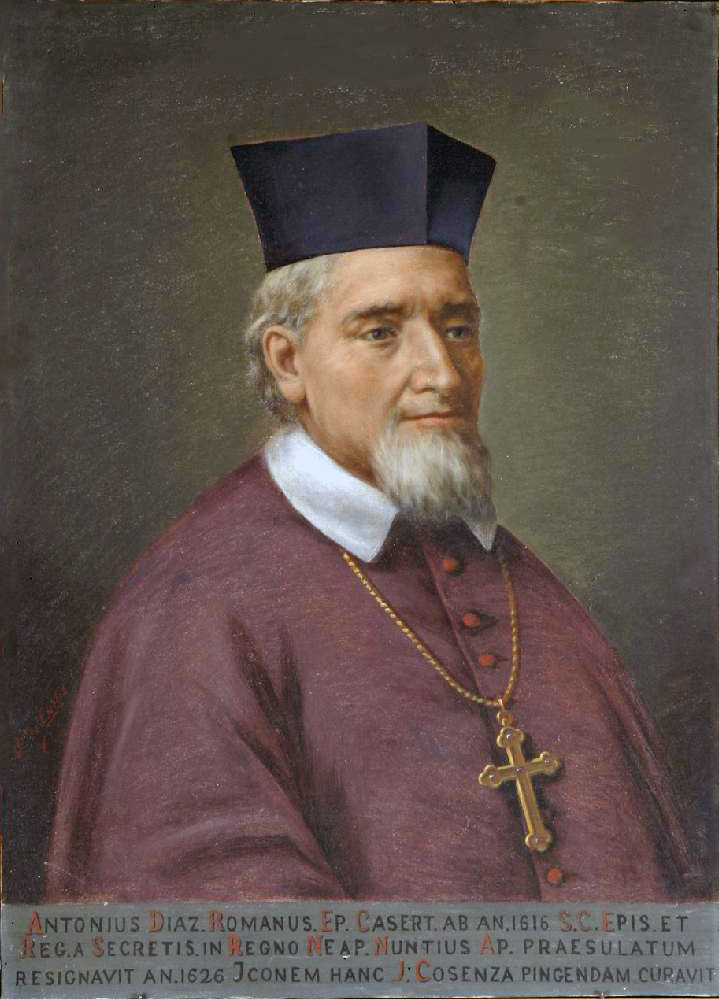
- Church: Catholic Church
- In office: 1626–1627
- Predecessor: Lorenzo Tramallo
- Successor: Cesare Monti
- Previous post: Bishop of Caserta (1616–1626)

Orders
- Consecration: 5 June 1616

Personal details
- Born: Naples, Italy

Antonio Díaz was a Roman Catholic prelate who served as Apostolic Nuncio to Naples (1626–1627) and Bishop of Caserta (1616–1626).

== Biography ==
Antonio Díaz was born in Naples, Italy. On 18 May 1616, Antonio Díaz was appointed during the papacy of Pope Paul V as Bishop of Caserta. On 5 June 1616, he was consecrated bishop by Maffeo Barberini, Bishop of Spoleto. On 15 May 1626, he was appointed Apostolic Nuncio to Naples by Pope Urban VIII. He resigned as Bishop of Caserta two weeks later on 31 March 1626. He served as Apostolic Nuncio to Naples until his resignation on 17 April 1627.

== Episcopal succession ==
While bishop, he was the principal co-consecrator of:

- Carlo Carafa, Bishop of Aversa (1616);
- Lorenzo Campeggi, Bishop of Cesena (1624);
- Basile Cacace, Titular Archbishop of Ephesus and Auxiliary Bishop of Ravenna (1624); and
- Antonio Marcello Barberini, Bishop of Senigallia (1625).

== External links and additional sources ==
- Cheney, David M. "Diocese of Caserta". Catholic-Hierarchy.org. (for Chronology of Bishops)
- Chow, Gabriel. "Diocese of Caserta". GCatholic.org. (for Chronology of Bishops)
- Cheney, David M. "Nunciature to Naples". Catholic-Hierarchy.org. (for Chronology of Bishops)

Catholic Church titles
Preceded by Diodato Gentile	Bishop of Caserta; 1616–1626	Succeeded by Giuseppe della Corgna
Preceded by Lorenzo Tramallo	Apostolic Nuncio to Naples; 1626–1627	Succeeded by Cesare Monti
