= Pescara Cathedral =

Church in Pescara, Italy

Coordinates: 42°27′37″N 14°12′44″E

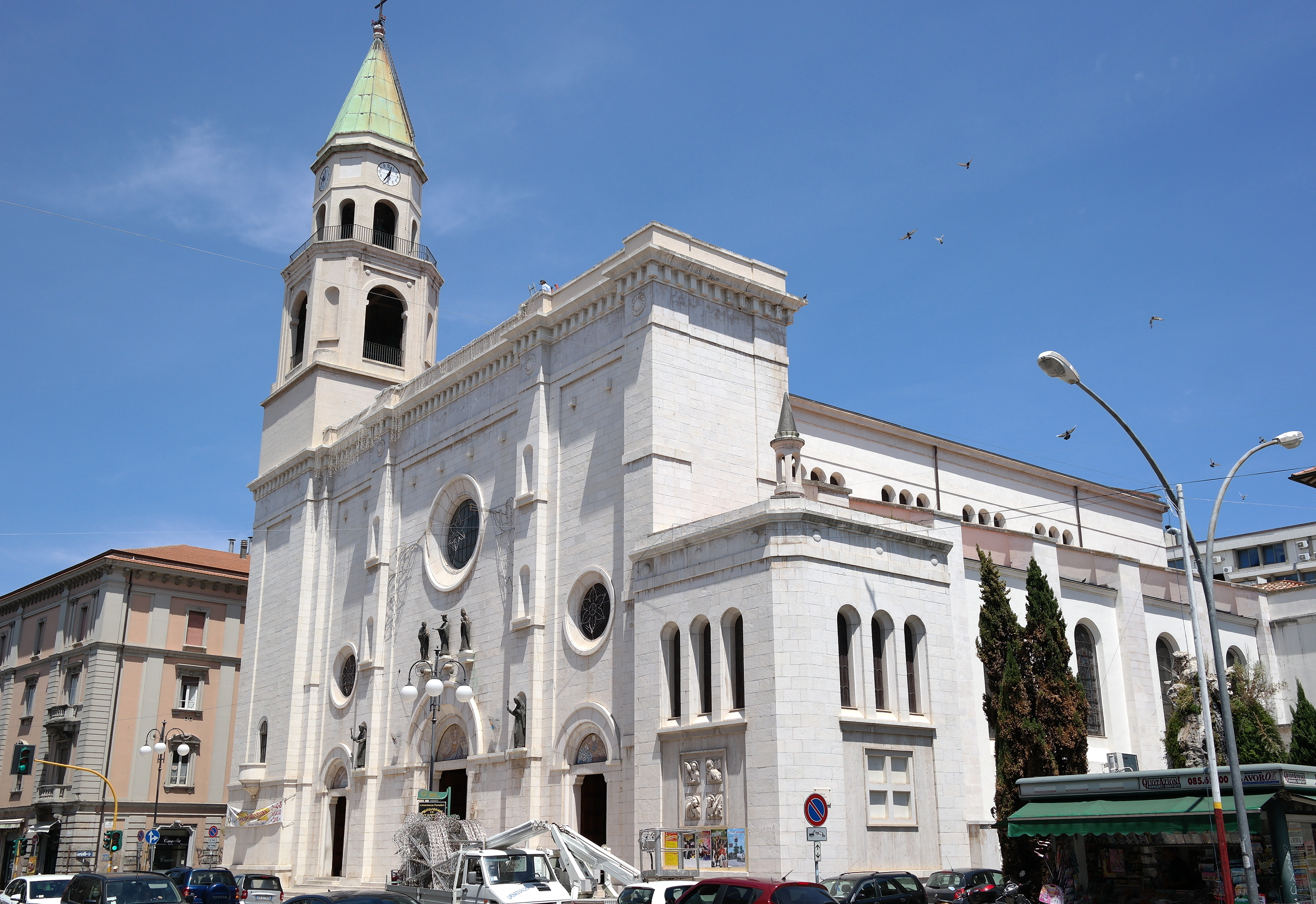
Pescara Cathedral

Pescara Cathedral (Italian: Duomo di Pescara, Cattedrale di San Cetteo Vescovo e Martire) is a Roman Catholic cathedral in the Via D'Annunzio in the city of Pescara. The cathedral, dedicated to Saint Cetteus, patron saint of Pescara, has been the seat of the Archbishop of Pescara-Penne since the creation of the archdiocese in 1982. The present Romanesque Revival building, originally called the Tempio della Conciliazione ("Temple of Conciliation"), was constructed in the 1930s, replacing the medieval church of San Cetteo.

== History ==
The construction of the present church was linked with the wave of intensive building activity that accompanied the creation of the city and province of Pescara in 1927. The medieval church of St. Cetteus (Italian: Chiesa di San Cetteo) that formerly stood on the site had fallen into such disrepair that it was demolished (a few traces of the old building can be seen on the pavement opposite). The construction of the new church was vigorously promoted by the writer Gabriele D'Annunzio, who had been baptised in the demolished church, and who was a generous donor to the project. D'Annunzio, one of whose principal concerns was to build a suitable tomb for his mother, commissioned the architect Cesare Bazzani. Work lasted from 1933 to 1938 or 1939. The façade had to be reconstructed after World War II as a result of war damages.

The original name of the new building, the Tempio della Conciliazione ("Temple of Conciliation"), is connected to the Lateran Pacts of 1929, marking the agreements made between the Italian Fascist government and the Vatican.

It was declared the cathedral of the former Diocese of Penne e Pescara in 1949 on the creation of the diocese, and when the diocese was elevated to an archdiocese in 1982, became the seat of the new Archbishop of Pescara-Penne.

== Exterior ==
Although the church is a modern build, it is clearly influenced by the architectural tradition of Abruzzo, above all Romanesque architecture, and particularly follows the style of the 11th-century Church of Santa Gerusalemme in Pescara. Typical of this and of the region is the severely rectangular façade decorated with rose windows (, ) a choice made jointly by D'Annunzio and the architect. The round-arched portals reflect the internal sub-division into three aisles, indicated on the outside by lesenes (applied strips). Adjoining the west front to the north, the campanile consists of an octagonal upper storey on a square base, while to the south is a small baptistry.

== Interior ==
In form this is a basilica with three aisles, as mentioned, separated by arcades of marble columns. The church has extremely good natural light. The choir ends in an apse. The church also has a transept. In one arm is a chapel dedicated to Saint Cetteus. In the other is the tomb of d'Annunzio's mother, Luisa De Benedictis, to which the sculptor Arrigo Minerbi contributed the funeral monument, consisting of an arch on which lies the figure of a young woman asleep.

The interior of the church houses various statues of saints and also Saint Francis Adoring a Crucifix, a c. 1649 painting attributed to Guercino and donated to the new building by D'Annunzio.

The church organ is one of the best in Abruzzo.

== See also ==
- Roman Catholic Archdiocese of Pescara-Penne
