= Pietro Farina =

Italian Roman Catholic bishop

- Bishop of Caserta
- Church: Catholic Church
- Diocese: Diocese of Caserta
- In office: 25 April 2009 – 24 September 2013
- Predecessor: Raffaele Nogaro
- Successor: Giovanni D'Alise
- Previous post: Bishop of Alife-Caiazzo (1999-2009)

Orders
- Ordination: 26 June 1966
- Consecration: 17 April 1999 by Lucas Moreira Neves

Personal details
- Born: 7 May 1942 Maddaloni, Province of Caserta, Kingdom of Italy
- Died: 24 September 2013 (aged 71)
- Coat of arms

Pietro Farina (7 May 1942 − 24 September 2013) was an Italian Roman Catholic bishop.

Ordained to the priesthood in 1966, Farina was named bishop of the Diocese of Alife-Caiazzo, Italy, in 1999 and then Bishop of the Diocese of Caserta in 2009, where he died in office.
