= Constantia =

Constantia may refer to:

== Places and jurisdictions ==
=== Europe ===
- Constanța or Constantia (in Scythia) (Κωνστάντια), Ancient Tomis, capital of (the Romanian part of) Dobruja region by the Black Sea
  - the former Diocese of Constantia in Scythia, now a Latin Catholic titular see
- Salamis, Cyprus, renamed Constantia in the 4th century, also Salamina (Italian), former seat of a Metropolitan archbishopric, now double (Latin Catholic and Cypriot Orthodox) titular see
- Coutances, France
- Konstanz, Germany

=== Asia ===
- Constantia, Lucknow, in Lucknow, India, built as the residence of Claude Martin
- Constantia (Osrhoene), a Roman/Byzantine city in northern Mesopotamia now in Asian Turkey

=== Elsewhere ===
- Constantia (town), New York, United States
  - Constantia (CDP), New York, a subdivision of Constantia, New York
- Constantia, Cape Town, South Africa

== Biology ==
- Constantia (plant), an orchid genus
- Constantia (gastropod) a genus of sea snails in the family Vanikoridae

== Other ==
- Constantia (wife of Gratian), wife of Roman emperor Gratian
- Leona Constantia, 17th-century alchemist
- Constantia (wine), a South African wine
- Constantia (typeface), a typeface introduced as part of Windows Vista
- Chevrolet Constantia, an automobile marketed in South Africa from 1969 to 1978
- Constantia, one of several ships of that name
