= Diocese of Caserta =

Roman Catholic diocese in Italy

Diocese of Caserta Dioecesis Casertana

Catholic
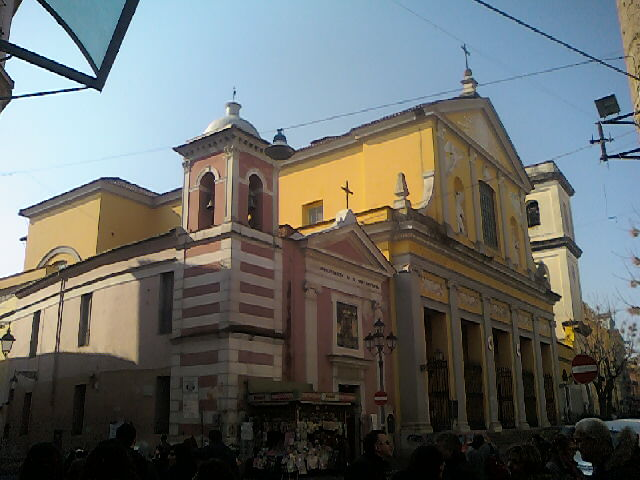
- Caserta Cathedral

Location
- Country: Italy
- Ecclesiastical province: Naples

Statistics
- Area: 185 km^{2} (71 sq mi)
- Population: Total; Catholics: (as of 2019); 210,000 (est.); 192,000 (guess)
- Parishes: 65

Information
- Denomination: Catholic Church
- Rite: Roman Rite
- Established: 12th Century
- Cathedral: Cattedrale di S. Michele Arcangelo
- Secular priests: 66 (diocesan); 25 (Religious Orders); 40 Permanent Deacons

Current leadership
- Pope: Leo XIV
- Bishop: Pietro Lagnese

Website
- www.diocesicaserta.it

The Diocese of Caserta (Latin: Dioecesis Casertana) is a Latin diocese of the Catholic Church in Campania, southern Italy. It is a suffragan of the Archdiocese of Naples. In 1818 Pope Pius VII united this see with the diocese of Caiazzo, but Pope Pius IX made them separate sees. In 2013 in the diocese of Caserta there was one priest for every 1,703 Catholics; in 2016, there was one priest for every 2,008 Catholics. The diocesan Major Seminary (as of 2019) has four seminarians.

== History ==
It is not known when Caserta became an episcopal see. The first-known bishop was Ranulfo whose election by the cathedral Chapter in 1113 was confirmed by Senne, Archbishop of Capua, the papal legate of the duchy of Capua. The cathedral Chapter was headed by three dignities (the Dean, the Archdeacon, and the Primicerius), in addition to whom there were eighteen Canons. A fourth dignity, the Archpriest, was added by Bishop Antonio Ricciulli (1639–1641).

In 1479, the diocese recovered by testamentary bequest the fiefs of Poccianello (Pozzianello) and Pozzovetere, which had been illegally seized and held by the Counts of Caserta. Bishop Agapito Bellomo (1554–1594), however, alienated them again, to the Princes of Caserta, to the anger of the ecclesiastical authorities (the Kingdom of Naples was a papal fief, and the pope was the overlord), which brought on extensive litigation with civil authorities.

In 1567, Bishop Agapito Bellomo (1554–1594) began the construction of a seminary building for Caserta, in accordance with the decrees of the Council of Trent. The institution was hampered, however, by a meager endowment, and the difficulties associated with introducing reform into the diocese. The choice of a site in Casertavecchio was unfortunate, since the bishops did not reside in the town, but in one of their palaces, either at Puccianiello or at Falciano. In 1708, Bishop Giuseppe Schinosi (1696–1734) moved the major seminary to Falciano. The major seminary was moved to Casertanuova in 1842, by decree of Pope Gregory XVI, though, between 1848 and 1860, the seminary was in temporary quarters until the new building in Casertanuova was completed.

In 1597, Bishop Benedetto Mandina (1594–1604) held a diocesan synod, during which he decreed the establishment of a Canon Theologus in the cathedral. He noted that his predecessor, Bishop Agapito Bellomo had already established the office of Canon Penitentiary, in accordance with the decrees of the Council of Trent. Bishop Ettore del Quarto (1734–1747) held a diocesan synod on 8 May 1745. Bishop Enrico de Rossi (1856–1893) held a diocesan synod on 8—10 May 1884.

In 1690, the city (civitas) of Caserta had a total population of c. 300 persons.

In 1750, King Charles VII of Naples purchased the entire feudal property of Caserta, which belonged to Count Michelangelo Gaetani. The king had been informed by his medical staff of the salubrious nature of the area. He announced plans to build a royal palace on a site some 7.5 km from Caserta Vecchia, which would become Caserta Nova. The population and government of Caserta Vecchia would be moved to the new site. Ground was broken for the new palace on the King's birthday, 20 January 1752. The palace was completed under the next king, Ferdinand IV, in 1774. Provisions for a new diocesan seat were delayed, however, by the long minority of King Ferdinand, by the French invasion, by the Parthenopean Republic, by the reconquest, by the kingship of Joseph Bonaparte, and the kingship of Joachim Murat.

On 2 May 1754, the King of Naples acquired the right to nominate the bishop of Caserta, subject to the approval of the pope.

=== Concordat of 1818 ===
Following the extinction of the Napoleonic Kingdom of Italy, the Congress of Vienna authorized the restoration of the Papal States and the Kingdom of Naples. Since the French occupation had seen the abolition of many Church institutions in the Kingdom, as well as the confiscation of most Church property and resources, it was imperative that Pope Pius VII and King Ferdinand IV reach agreement on restoration and restitution. Ferdinand, however, was not prepared to accept the pre-Napoleonic situation, in which Naples was a feudal subject of the papacy. Lengthy, detailed, and acrimonious negotiations ensued.

In 1818, a new concordat with the Kingdom of the Two Sicilies committed the pope to the suppression of more than fifty small dioceses in the kingdom. The ecclesiastical province of Naples was spared from any suppressions, but the province of Capua was affected. Pope Pius VII, in the bull "De Utiliori" of 27 June 1818, chose to unite the two dioceses of Calvi and Teano under the leadership of one bishop, aeque principaliter. He also suppressed the diocese of Venafro completely, and assigned its people and territory to the diocese of Isernia. Similarly, Carinola was suppressed and assigned to Suessa. Caiazzo was suppressed, and assigned to the diocese of Caserta. In the same concordat, the King was confirmed in the right to nominate candidates for vacant bishoprics, subject to the approval of the pope. That situation persisted down until the final overthrow of the Bourbon monarchy in 1860.

The diocese of Caiazzo was revived, however, and a new bishop was appointed on 15 March 1852. Caserta lost the territory which it had gained in 1818.

=== New cathedral in Casertanuova ===
After the second Bourbon restoration, King Ferdinando IV (Ferdinando I of the Two Sicilies) accepted the proposal of Bishop Francesco Gualtieri (1818–1832) that a new cathedral be constructed in Casertanuova. The first stone was laid on 30 May 1822. In 1832, the new church near the royal palace, built under the patronage of Ferdinand II of the Two Sicilies and intended to be the new cathedral, was consecrated. It was dedicated to S. Michele Arcangelo. It did not become a cathedral, however, until 1841, when, responding to the petition of Bishop Domenico Narni Mancinelli (1832–1848), and with the agreement of Ferdinand II, Pope Gregory XVI authorized the transfer of the episcopal seat from Casertavecchia.

In the papal bull, "Inter Apostolicae", of 15 July 1841, Pope Gregory permanently suppressed the current cathedral in Casertavecchia, and reduced it to the status of a simple parish church. The bishop was to appoint a parochial vicar, and pay his salary; care of the parishioners was to be in the hands of the Alcantarine fathers. The new cathedral was to be the church of S. Michele Arcangelo in Casertanuova, and it was designated to be a parish church as well (to be administered by a Vicar Curate). The new cathedral was to be administered by a cathedral Chapter, which was to consist of four dignities and twenty Canons (one of whom was to be the Theologus, and the other the Penitentiarius). Of the four thousand Masses which were formerly said in the old cathedral, three thousand were to be transferred to the new cathedral.

The Pope also ordered the closing of the seminary in Casertavecchia, and the consolidation of the students with the seminary of Falciano, near Casertanuova.

The new cathedral was found to be inadequate both for architectural splendor befitting a royal capital and capital of a province, and the inadequate liturgical space for episcopal functions. Agitation for a replacement began even as the cathedral was being completed. Bishop Enrico de Rossi therefore began the construction of a newer cathedral, laying the foundation stone on 8 May 1859. It was financed by the King, who took possession of the episcopal residence and seminary in Falciano, which were turned into military buildings. A newer episcopal palace and seminary were constructed in Casertanuova, near the newer cathedral.

=== New ecclesiastical province ===
Following the Second Vatican Council, and in accordance with the norms laid out in the council's decree, Christus Dominus chapter 40, major changes were made in the ecclesiastical administrative structure of southern Italy. Wide consultations had taken place with the bishops and other prelates who would be affected. Action, however, was deferred, first by the death of Pope Paul VI on 6 August 1978, then the death of Pope John Paul I on 28 September 1978, and the election of Pope John Paul II on 16 October 1978. Pope John Paul II issued a decree, "Quamquam Ecclesia," on 30 April 1979, ordering the changes. Three ecclesiastical provinces were abolished entirely: those of Conza, Capua, and Sorrento. A new ecclesiastical province was created, to be called the Regio Campana, whose Metropolitan was the Archbishop of Naples. The dioceses formerly members of the suppressed province of Capua (Gaeta, Calvi and Teano, Caserta, and Sessa Arunca) became suffragans of Naples.

== Bishops of Caserta ==
=== to 1600 ===
...

- Ranulfus (attested 1113, 1127)
- Nicolaus (attested 1130)
- Joannes (attested 1153–1164)

...

- Porphyrius (attested 1178–1183)

...

- Stabile (attested 1208)

...

- Hieronymus
- Andreas (1234)

...

- Roger (Ruggero) (1241–1264)

Ennichius (attested 1267) Administrator

- Philippus, O.Min. (attested 1267)
- Nicolaus de Fiore (attested 1279)
- Secundus (1285)
- Atto (Azzo) (attested 1290, 1310)
- Antonius, O.Min. (attested 1310)
- Benvenutus (attested 1322–c. 1343)
- Nicolaus (1344–1351)
- Jacobus Martoni (1351–1370)
- Nicolaus Sullimene (1374– ? )
- Lisulus Avignon Obedience
- Joannes de Achillo (1394– ? ) Avignon Obedience
- Ludovicus Landi (1397–1413) Roman Obedience
- Logerius (1413–1415?) Roman Obedience?
- Giovanni Acresta, O.P. (1415– ? )
- Stefano de Raho (1450– ? )
- Joannes (attested in 1456)
- Antonio Cicco da Pontecorvo, O.F.M. (5 Nov 1459 – 21 Apr 1477)
- Giovanni de Lioni Gallucci (1477–1493)
- Giovanni Battista Petrucci (1493–1514)
- Giambattista Boncianni (1514–1532)
- Pietro Lamberti (1533–1541)
- Girolamo Verallo (1541–1544)
- Girolamo Dandini (14 Nov 1544 –1546)
- Marzio Cerboni (17 May 1546 – 1549 Died)
- Bernardino Maffei (7 Jun 1549 – 9 Nov 1549 Appointed, Archbishop of Chieti)
- Federico Cesi (9 Nov 1549 – 12 Feb 1552 Resigned)
- Antonio Bernardo de Mirandola (12 Feb 1552 – 1554 Resigned)
- Agapito Bellomo (5 Dec 1554 – 1594 Died)
- Benedetto Mandina, C.R. (1594–1604)

=== 1600 to 1900 ===
- Diodato Gentile, O.P. (1604–1616)
- Antonio Díaz (18 May 1616 – 31 Mar 1626 Resigned)
- Giuseppe della Corgna (Cornea), O.P. (27 May 1626 –1636)
- Alessandro Suardi ((Fabrizio Suardi) (9 Feb 1637 – Apr 1638 Died)
- Antonio Ricciulli (7 Feb 1639 –1641)
- Bruno Sciamanna (10 Mar 1642 – 1647 Died)
- Bartolomeo Cresconi (6 May 1647 – 16 Apr 1660 Died)
- Giambattista Ventriglia (20 Sep 1660 – 23 Dec 1662 Died)
- Giuseppe de Auxilio (2 Jul 1663 – 28 Jul 1668 Died)
- Bonaventura Cavalli, O.F.M. (10 Dec 1668 –1689)
- Ippolito Berarducci, O.S.B. (1690–1695)
- Giuseppe Schinosi (1696–1734)
- Ettore Quarti (del Quarto) (1734–1747)
- Antonio Falangola (29 May 1747 – 25 Mar 1761 Died)
- Gennaro Maria Albertini, C.R. (13 Jul 1761 – 26 May 1767 Died)
- Nicola Filomarini (Filomarino), O.S.B. (31 Aug 1767 – 4 Sep 1781 Died)
- Domenico Pignatelli di Belmonte, C.R. (25 Feb 1782 –1802)
- Vincenzo Rogadei, O.S.B. (1805–1816)
- Francesco Saverio Gualtieri (1818–1831)
- Domenico Narni Mancinelli (24 Feb 1832 – 17 Apr 1848 Died)
- Vincenzo Rozzolino (28 Sep 1849 – 10 Nov 1855 Died)
- Enrico de Rossi (16 Jun 1856 – 12 Jun 1893 Resigned)
- Gennaro Cosenza (1893–1913)

=== since 1900 ===
- Mario Palladino (4 Jun 1913 – 17 Oct 1921 Died)
- Gabriele Natale Moriondo, O.P. (19 May 1922 – 1 Jun 1943 Resigned)
- Bartolomeo Mangino (18 Feb 1946 – 26 May 1965 Died)
- Vito Roberti (15 Aug 1965 – 6 Jun 1987 Retired)
- Francesco Cuccarese (6 Jun 1987 – 21 Apr 1990 Appointed, Archbishop of Pescara-Penne)
- Raffaele Nogaro (20 Oct 1990 – 25 Apr 2009 Retired)
- Pietro Farina (25 Apr 2009 – 24 Sep 2013 Died)
- Giovanni D'Alise (21 Mar 2014 – 4 October 2020 Died)
- Pietro Lagnese (19 Dec 2020 – present)

== Bibliography ==
=== Reference works ===
- Gams, Pius Bonifatius (1873). Series episcoporum Ecclesiae catholicae: quotquot innotuerunt a beato Petro apostolo. Ratisbon: Typis et Sumptibus Georgii Josephi Manz. p. 870-871.(Use with caution; obsolete)
- Eubel, Conradus, ed. (1913). Hierarchia catholica (in Latin). Vol. Tomus 1 (second ed.). Münster: Libreria Regensbergiana.
- Eubel, Conradus, ed. (1914). Hierarchia catholica (in Latin). Vol. Tomus 2 (second ed.). Münster: Libreria Regensbergiana.
- Eubel, Conradus; Gulik, Guilelmus (1923). Hierarchia catholica (in Latin). Vol. Tomus 3 (second ed.). Münster: Libreria Regensbergiana.
- Gauchat, Patritius (Patrice) (1935). Hierarchia catholica. Vol. Tomus IV (1592-1667). Münster: Libraria Regensbergiana.
- Ritzler, Remigius; Sefrin, Pirminus (1952). Hierarchia catholica medii et recentis aevi. Vol. Tomus V (1667-1730). Patavii: Messagero di S. Antonio.
- Ritzler, Remigius; Sefrin, Pirminus (1958). Hierarchia catholica medii et recentis aevi. Vol. Tomus VI (1730-1799). Patavii: Messagero di S. Antonio.
- Ritzler, Remigius; Sefrin, Pirminus (1968). Hierarchia Catholica medii et recentioris aevi (in Latin). Vol. VII (1800–1846). Monasterii: Libreria Regensburgiana.
- Remigius Ritzler; Pirminus Sefrin (1978). Hierarchia catholica Medii et recentioris aevi (in Latin). Vol. VIII (1846–1903). Il Messaggero di S. Antonio.
- Pięta, Zenon (2002). Hierarchia catholica medii et recentioris aevi (in Latin). Vol. IX (1903–1922). Padua: Messagero di San Antonio. ISBN 978-88-250-1000-8.

=== Studies ===
- Cappelletti, Giuseppe (1866). Le chiese d'Italia: dalla loro origine sino ai nostri giorni : opera (in Italian). Vol. vigesmo (20). Venice: G. Antonelli. pp. 241–260.
- Collezione degli atti emanati dopo la pubblicazione del Concordato dell'anno 1818: contenente i brevi e le lettere apostoliche, i reali decreti e rescritti, le circolari ed istruzioni pubblicate da aprile 1840 a tutto dicembre 1841; non che una copiosa appendice a' precedenti volumi. 9 (in Italian and Latin). Vol. Parte nona (9). Napoli: Stamperia dell'Iride. 1842.
- De Blasiis, Nicola (1842). Della origine, e traslazione della chiesa cattedrale di Caserta. Ragionamento storico (in Italian). Caserta: Tipografia di Donato Orfano.
- Esperti, Crescenzio (1773). Memorie istoriche ed ecclesiastiche della città di Caserta (in Italian). Napoli: Stamperia Avelliniana.
- Giorgi, Lucia (2008). "Le residenze dei vescovi di Caserta dalla fine del 1400 e gli interventi barocchi nella cattedrale di S. Michele Archangelo di Casertavecchia," in: Rivista di Terra di Lavoro. Bolletino on-line dell'Archivio di Stato di Caserta. Vol. III, no. 1 (April 2008), pp. 21–49. (in Italian)
- Kamp, Norbert (1973). Kirche und Monarchie im staufischen Königreich Sizilien. Prosopographische Grundlegung. Bistümer und Bischöfe des Königreichs 1194-1266. 1. Abruzzen und Kampanien, Munich 1973, pp. 169–177. (in German)
- Kehr, Paul Fridolin (1925). Italia pontificia Vol. VIII (Berlin: Weidmann 1925), pp. 276–278. (in Latin)
- Ughelli, Ferdinando; Coleti, Niccolo (1720). Italia sacra sive De episcopis Italiæ, et insularum adjacentium (in Latin). Vol. Tomus sextus (6). Venice: apud Sebastianum Coleti. pp. 483–531.
