= Giovanni Battista Cantalicio =

Roman Catholic bishop

Giovanni Battista Valentini, (Cantalicio) (Cantalice, circa 1450 - Rome, 1515), was an Italian humanist, author and Catholic bishop.

== Biography ==
Cantalcio was born in Cantalice, but his origins are obscure. It is known that, 1460s, he became a follower of Cardinal Papiense at Pavia. He then became a master of the school, and for over 20 years he taught grammar, poetry, rhetoric and history, in different parts of Tuscany. In his capacity as teacher, he is known to have been in San Gimignano from 1471 to 1476. He was then in Siena (where he wrote Rheatina: pro defensione Senensius ). He was summoned to Florence by Lorenzo de' Medici, to whom he had dedicated a poem in 1472 on the sack of Volterra. The relations between him and the Medici court was encouraged by Cantalicio's friend, the humanist Agnolo Poliziano.

Cantalicio later he taught at Rieti, Foligno, Spoleto, Perugia and Viterbo, where he continued to write. From this period date his Summa perutilis in regulas distinctas totius artis grammatices et artis metricae and Epigrammata (in 12 books) published in 1493. Most of his poems are dedicated to the classical Latin authors, among whom Juvenal, Martial, Ovid, Horace and Terence. Others are dedicated to the lords of the courts where he stayed, including Giulio Cesare Varano and Federico da Montefeltro, to whom he dedicated the De pometto gestis et moribus invictissimi Phederici Pheretrani Urbini Ducis.

In 1494 he was in Naples, in the retinue of Cardinal Giovanni Borgia, for the investiture of Alfonso II of Naples. His enthusiasm for the dynasty of Aragon made him sing the praises of the Duchess Isabella as well as Bartolomeo d'Alviano, to whom he dedicated a poem to the defense of Bracciano of 1497. Later, he dedicated to Lucrezia Borgia, Lucretiana the Spectacula, a detailed account of the celebrations held in Rome for her marriage to Alfonso I d'Este: it was, according to Benedetto Croce, best published description of that event.

Traveling between Rome and Naples, he was able to befriend Gonsalvo or Gonzalo Fernández de Córdoba, Viceroy of Naples, by whose influence he attained from Pope Julius II the Diocese of Atri-Penne, whose bishop he became on 1 December 1503. Not surprisingly, in 1506, dedicated to Gonsalvo a poem in four books, De bis recepta parthenope Gonsalviae. He attended the first session of the Fifth Lateran Council, before giving up the bishopric in favor of his nephew. (The Diocese of Atri - Penne is today divided between the Archdiocese of Pescara-Penne and the Diocese of Teramo-Atri).

== See also ==
- Renaissance humanism
- Renaissance poetry
- Italian poets

== Bibliography ==
- B. Croce, Uomini e cose della vecchia Italia, s. I, Laterza, Bari 1927.
- B. Croce, Un poema inedito del Cantalicio sulla caccia, in Idem, Aneddoti di varia letteratura, vol. I, Laterza, Bari 1953.
- E. Giammarco, Storia della cultura e della letteratura abruzzese, Edizioni dell'Ateneo, Roma 1969.
- G. Procacci, La disfida di Barletta tra storia e romanzo, Mondadori, Milano 2001.
- F.A. Soria, Memorie storico-critiche degli storici napoletani, t. I, Simoniana, Napoli 1781, pp. 124–128
