= Silvestro Andreozzi =

Roman Catholic Bishop

Most Reverend Silvestro Andreozzi
- Bishop of Penne e Atri
- Church: Catholic Church
- Diocese: Diocese of Penne e Atri
- In office: 1621–1648
- Predecessor: Tommasi Balbani
- Successor: Francesco Massucci

Orders
- Consecration: 18 April 1621 by Giovanni Garzia Mellini

Personal details
- Born: 1575 Lucca, Italy
- Died: January 1648 (age 73) Penne e Atri, Italy

Silvestro Andreozzi (1575–1648) was a Roman Catholic prelate who served as Bishop of Penne e Atri (1621–1648).

== Biography ==
Silvestro Andreozzi was born in Lucca, Italy, in 1575. On 17 March 1621, he was appointed during the papacy of Pope Paul V as Bishop of Penne e Atri. On 18 April 1621, he was consecrated bishop by Giovanni Garzia Mellini, Cardinal-Priest of Santi Quattro Coronati, with Attilio Amalteo, Titular Archbishop of Athenae, and Paolo De Curtis, Bishop Emeritus of Isernia, serving as co-consecrators. He served as Bishop of Penne e Atri until his death in January 1648. While bishop, he was the principal co-consecrator of Costantino de Rossi, Bishop of Cefalonia e Zante (1634).

== External links and additional sources ==
- Cheney, David M. "Archdiocese of Pescara-Penne". Catholic-Hierarchy.org. (Chronology of Bishops) ^{[self-published]}
- Chow, Gabriel. "Metropolitan Archdiocese of Pescara-Penne". GCatholic.org. (Chronology of Bishops) ^{[self-published]}

Catholic Church titles
Preceded by Tommasi Balbani	Bishop of Penne e Atri; 1621–1648	Succeeded by Francesco Massucci
