= Bolognano =

Municipality and town in Abruzzo, Italy

- Comune
- Comune di Bolognano
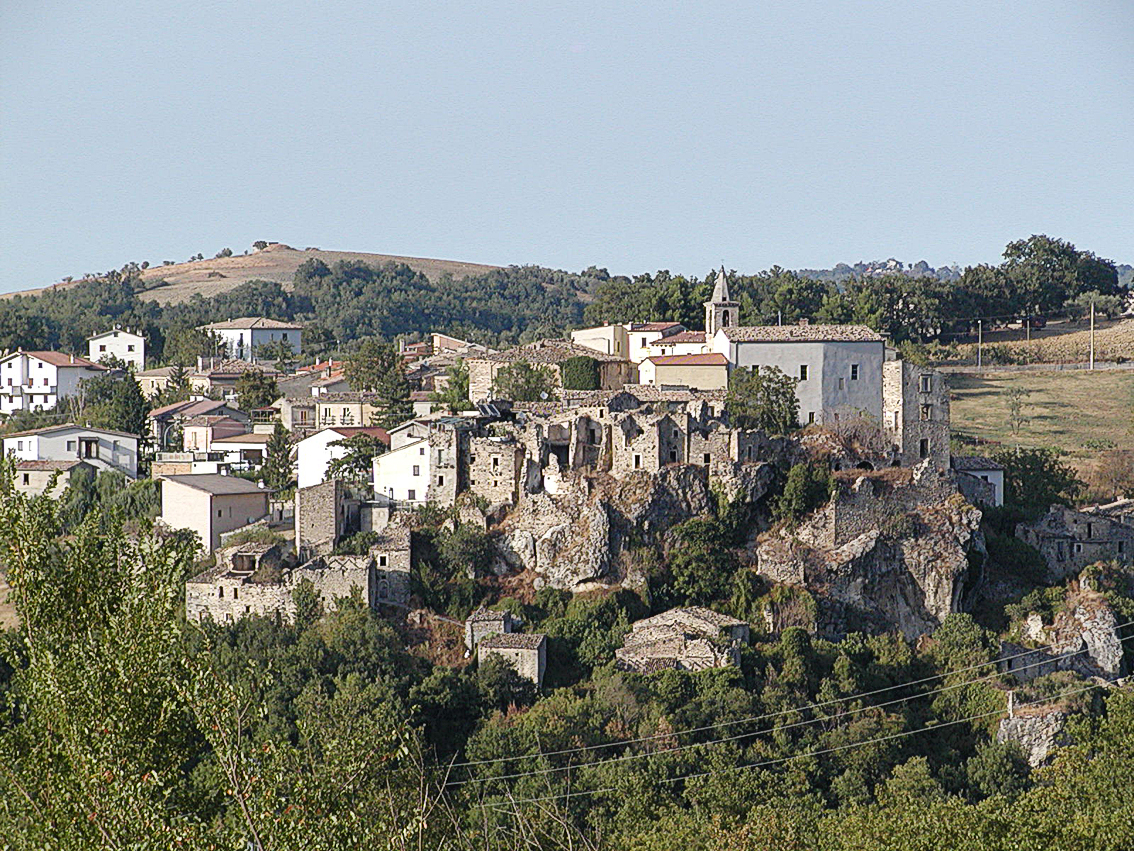
- View of Musellaro (frazione of Bolognano)

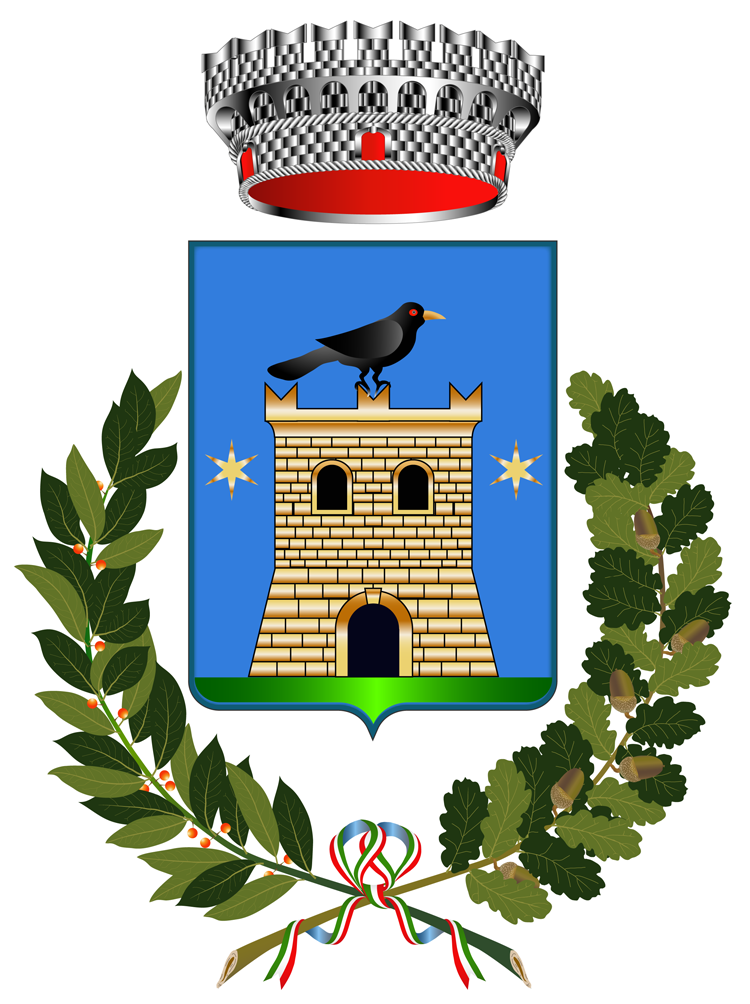
- Coat of arms

- Location within Italy Location within Abruzzo
- Coordinates: 42°13′N 13°57′E
- Country: Italy
- Region: Abruzzo
- Province: Pescara (PE)
- Frazioni: Fara, Madonna del Monte, Musellaro, Piano d'Orta

Government
  - Mayor: Agapito Grossi (Ind.)

Area
  - Total: 16.96 km^{2} (6.55 sq mi)
- Elevation: 276 m (906 ft)

Population (30 April 2017)
  - Total: 1,100
  - Density: 65/km^{2} (170/sq mi)
- Demonym: Bolognanesi
- Time zone: UTC+1 (CET)
  - Summer (DST): UTC+2 (CEST)
- Postal code: 65020
- Dialing code: 085
- Patron saint: St. Anthony the Abbot
- Saint day: 13 January
- Website: Official website

Bolognano is a municipality (Italian: comune) and town in the province of Pescara in the Abruzzo region of Italy.
