= Gregorio Santacroce =

Roman Catholic prelate

Most Reverend Gregorio Santacroce
- Bishop of Giovinazzo
- Church: Catholic Church
- Diocese: Diocese of Giovinazzo
- In office: 1610–1611
- Predecessor: Giovanni Antonio Viperani
- Successor: Giulio Masi
- Previous post: Coadjutor Bishop of Giovinazzo (1606-1610)

Personal details
- Died: 1611 Giovinazzo, Italy

Gregorio Santacroce (died 1611) was a Roman Catholic prelate who served as Bishop of Giovinazzo (1610–1611).

== Biography ==
Gregorio Santacroce was ordained a priest in the Order of Saint Benedict. On 12 June 1606, he was appointed by Pope Paul V as Coadjutor Bishop of Giovinazzo and Titular Bishop of Dragobitia. He succeeded to the bishopric on March 1610 after the death of his predecessor. He served as Bishop of Giovinazzo until his death in 1611.

== External links and additional sources ==
- Cheney, David M. "Diocese of Giovinazzo e Terlizzi". Catholic-Hierarchy.org. (for Chronology of Bishops) ^{[self-published]}
- Chow, Gabriel. "Diocese of Giovinazzo (Italy)". GCatholic.org. (for Chronology of Bishops) ^{[self-published]}

Catholic Church titles
Preceded by Juan Antolínez Brecianos de la Rivera	Bishop of Giovinazzo; 1610–1611	Succeeded by Giulio Masi
