= Giovanni Antonio Viperani =

Roman Catholic prelate

Most Reverend Giovanni Antonio Viperani
- Church: Catholic Church
- Diocese: Diocese of Giovinazzo
- In office: 1589–1610
- Predecessor: Luciano Rosso
- Successor: Gregorio Santacroce

Personal details
- Died: March 1610 Giovinazzo, Italy

Giovanni Antonio Viperani (1535 - March 1610) was an Italian Renaissance humanist and Roman Catholic prelate who served as Bishop of Giovinazzo (1589–1610).

== Biography ==
Giovanni Antonio Viperani was born in Messina, Sicily. On 17 May 1589, he was appointed by Pope Sixtus V as Bishop of Giovinazzo in the region of Apulia. He served as Bishop of Giovinazzo until his death in March 1610. While bishop, he was the principal consecrator of Camillo Borghese, Bishop of Castro di Puglia, and Decio Caracciolo Rosso, Archbishop of Bari.

== Works ==
A learned humanist, Viperani achieved some early fame with a systematic treatise on the writing of history (De scribenda historia, 1569) and wrote numerous other works, always in Latin, over the subsequent three decades, on biography, providence, and virtue, among many others, as well as a volume of his own poems. In 1579 Viperani published his De poetica libri tres, dedicated to Philip II's Secretary of State, Antoine Perrenot de Granvelle. Shortly after the De poetica came a rhetoric and a commentary on Cicero's De Optimo Genere Oratorum (1581). Viperani's De scribenda historia was included in the Artis Historicae Penus of 1579. His writings were collected and published in 1605 in Naples.

== External links and additional sources ==
- De Blasi, Guido (2020). "VIPERANO, Giovanni Antonio". Dizionario Biografico degli Italiani (in Italian). Vol. 99: Verrazzano–Vittorio Amedeo. Rome: Institute of the Italian Encyclopaedia. ISBN 978-88-12-00032-6.
- Cheney, David M. "Diocese of Giovinazzo e Terlizzi". Catholic-Hierarchy.org. (for Chronology of Bishops) ^{[self-published]}
- Chow, Gabriel. "Diocese of Giovinazzo (Italy)". GCatholic.org. (for Chronology of Bishops) ^{[self-published]}

Catholic Church titles
Preceded by Luciano Rosso	Bishop of Giovinazzo; 1589–1610	Succeeded by Gregorio Santacroce
