= Giacinto Gaetano Chiurlia =

Roman Catholic Bishop of Giovinazzo (1659–1730)

Most Reverend Gregorio Santacroce
- Bishop of Giovinazzo
- Church: Catholic Church
- Diocese: Diocese of Giovinazzo
- In office: 1693–1730
- Predecessor: Agnelo Alfieri
- Successor: Paolo de Mercurio

Orders
- Consecration: On 24 August 1693 by Galeazzo Marescotti

Personal details
- Born: 4 January 1659 Rome, Italy
- Died: 23 March 1730 (age 71) Giovinazzo, Italy

Giacinto Gaetano Chiurlia (also Giacinto Gaetano Chyurlia) (4 January 1659 – 23 March 1730) was a Roman Catholic prelate who served as Bishop of Giovinazzo (1693–1730).

== Biography ==
Giacinto Gaetano Chiurlia was born in Rome, Italy. On 24 August 1693, he was appointed by Pope Innocent XII as Coadjutor Bishop of Giovinazzo. On 24 August 1693, he was consecrated bishop by Galeazzo Marescotti, Cardinal-Priest of Santi Quirico e Giulitta with Sperello Sperelli, Bishop of Terni, and Stefano Giuseppe Menatti, Titular Bishop of Cyrene, serving as co-consecrators. He served as Bishop of Giovinazzo until his death on 23 March 1730.

== Episcopal succession ==
Episcopal succession of Giacinto Gaetano Chiurlia

While bishop, he served as the principal co-consecrator of:

- Ludovico Agnello Anastasio, Archbishop of Sorrento (1724);
- Agostino Pipia, Bishop of Osimo (1724);
- Alberto Gualtieri, Bishop of Nicotera (1725);
- Jean François Fouquet, Titular Bishop of Eleutheropolis in Macedonia (1725);
- Filippo Coscia, Titular Bishop of Targa (1725);
- Vittorio Mazzocca, Bishop of Novigrad (1725);
- Nicola Stanislavich, Bishop of Nicopoli (1725);
- Stephen MacEgan, Bishop of Clonmacnoise (1725);
- Thomas Dominic Williams, Vicar Apostolic of the Northern District (1725);
- Alessandro Burgos, Bishop of Catania (1726);
- Nicolò Maria de' Franchi, Archbishop of Genoa (1726);
- Cherubino Tommaso Nobilione, Bishop of Avellino e Frigento (1726);
- Giovanni Battista Lomellini, Bishop of Alghero (1727);
- Benedetto Bussi, Bishop of Recanati e Loreto (1727);
- Carlo Vincenzo Maria Ferreri Thaon, Bishop of Alessandria (1727); and
- VIncenzo Maria Mazzoleni, Archbishop of Corfù (1727).

== See also ==
- Catholic Church in Italy

== External links and additional sources ==
- Cheney, David M. "Diocese of Giovinazzo e Terlizzi". Catholic-Hierarchy.org. (for Chronology of Bishops) ^{[self-published]}
- Chow, Gabriel. "Diocese of Giovinazzo (Italy)". GCatholic.org. (for Chronology of Bishops) ^{[self-published]}

Catholic Church titles
Preceded by Agnelo Alfieri	Bishop of Giovinazzo; 1693–1730	Succeeded by Paolo de Mercurio
