= Diocese of Molfetta-Ruvo-Giovinazzo-Terlizzi =

Roman Catholic diocese in Italy

Coordinates: 41.2000°N 16.6000°E

Diocese of Molfetta-Ruvo-Giovinazzo-Terlizzi Dioecesis Melphictensis-Rubensis-Iuvenacensis-Terlitiensis

Catholic
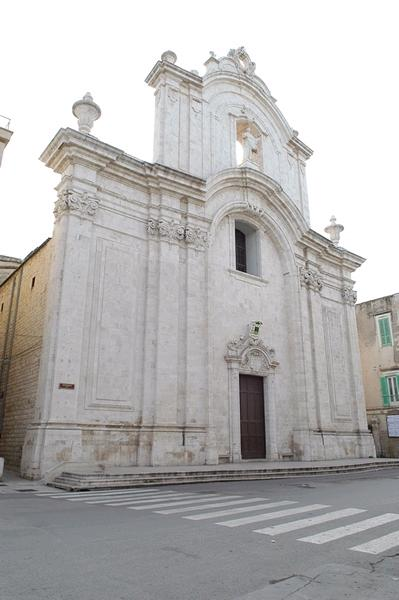
- Cathedral of S. Maria Assunta, Molfetta

Location
- Country: Italy
- Ecclesiastical province: Bari-Bitonto

Statistics
- Area: 442 km^{2} (171 sq mi)
- Population: Total; Catholics: (as of 2023); 128,730 ▼; 125,758 ▼ (97.7%)
- Parishes: 36

Information
- Denomination: Catholic Church
- Rite: Roman Rite
- Established: 12th Century
- Cathedral: Cattedrale di S. Maria Assunta
- Co-cathedral: Concattedrale di S. Maria Assunta (Ruvo); Concattedrale di S. Maria Assunta (Giovinazzo); Concattedrale di S. Michele Arcangelo (Terlizzi)
- Secular priests: 69 (diocesan) ▼18 (religious Orders) ▼7 Permanent Deacons ▼

Current leadership
- Pope: Leo XIV
- Bishop: Domenico Basile
- Bishops emeritus: Domenico Cornacchia

Website
- Diocesi di Molfetta-Ruvo-Giovinazzo-Terlizzi (in Italian)

The Diocese of Molfetta-Ruvo-Giovinazzo-Terlizzi (Latin: Dioecesis Melphictensis-Rubensis-Iuvenacensis-Terlitiensis) is a Latin diocese of the Catholic Church in Apulia, southern Italy, which was established in 1986, when the diocese of Molfetta-Giovinazzo-Terlizzi was united with the diocese of Ruvo. Giovinazzo is only four miles south-east of Molfetta along the Adriatic coast, and Ruvo only ten miles inland to the south-west; Terlizzi is likewise only four miles from Molfetta, some four miles nearer than Ruvo. The historical diocese of Molfetta was expanded in 1818. The current diocese is a suffragan of the archdiocese of Bari-Bitonto.

== History ==
The name Molfetta appears nowhere before the 10th century. The diocese of Molfetta is not older than the 11th century. The first bishop of Molfetta of whom there is any record was Bishop Joannes, who issued a charter in 1136. The diocese was at first a suffragan (subordinate diocese) of Bari, but in 1484 it became immediately dependent upon Rome.

=== Boniface VIII and Bishop Paulus ===
Following the death of Pope Nicholas IV on 4 April 1292, a dozen cardinals took 27 months to agree on a successor, the hermit monk Pietro del Morrone, a man in his mid-80s. The cardinals wanted him to come to Perugia, where the Conclave had taken place, but he was convinced by Cardinal Pietro Colonna, the agent of Charles II, King of Naples, to go to Naples for his coronation. The new pope, Celestine V as Pietro del Morrone called himself, reserved for himself all the benefices in the Church which were vacant or would become vacant.But within five months, it became apparent that Celestine was not up to the tasks involved in being pope, and he decided, on the urging of many people, to resign. His successor, Boniface VIII (Benedetto Caetani), was elected on Christmas Eve, 1294. Three days later, he revoked all of the provisions in anticipation of vacancies made by his predecessors, Nicholas IV and Celestine V, as well as those made by himself and Cardinal Gerardo Bianchi when they were legates in France. He also suspended all holders of benefices which had been made without the consent of the cardinals in consistory, contrary to practice.

These circumstances directly affected the Church of Molfetta. Celestine V had specially reserved the appointment of the next bishop to the papacy. When he heard that the bishop of Molfetta had died, he granted to Cardinal Thomas de Aquila (d'Ocre) and Cardina Pietro Colonna by letter the right to provide a bishop for the diocese of Molfetta. With these faculties, they provided Fra Petrus, O.Min., whom Celestine later confirmed, and granted Petrus the privilege of being consecrated by whichever bishop he should choose. He was consecrated by the bishop of Civitas, Boniface VIII's bull, however, had suspended all of Celestine's provisions, and additionally the provision of Petrus, O.Min. had been irregular, at least in Boniface's view, and Petrus too was suspended. After investigating the entire affair, and taking counsel with the cardinals, Boniface VIII himself preferred (appointed) Petrus, O.Min. to the post of bishop of Molfetta on 2 December 1295.

=== Directly subject to Papacy ===
Pope Innocent VIII (Cibo), who had been Bishop of Molfetta from 1472 to 1484, granted the diocese the privilege of being immediately subject to the Roman pontiff, without any other Metropolitan.

=== Statistics ===
In 1600 the city of Molfetta had a population of around 10,000; in 1775 it was around 9,000. In the city were five religious houses for men, and one monastery of male monks. In 1775 there were four religious houses.

=== Enlargement of diocese ===
Following the expulsion of the French, a concordat with Naples was signed on 16 February 1818, and ratified by Pope Pius VII on 25 February 1818. King Ferdinand I of the Two Sicilies issued the concordat as a law on 21 March 1818. The right of the king to nominate the candidate for a vacant bishopric was recognized, as in the Concordat of 1741, subject to papal confirmation (preconisation). On 27 June 1818, Pius VII issued the bull De Ulteriore, in which, among many other things, he dealt with dioceses which had been directly subject to the Holy See. The decision was made to suppress permanently the united diocese of Giovinazzo and diocese of Terlizzi, once the current incumbent had vacated the seats, and to incorporate the two dioceses into the diocese of Molfetta.

On 4 March 1836, Pope Gregory XVI, in the bull "Aeterni Patris", united the dioceses of Giovenazzo and Terlizzi with the diocese of Molfetta. The dioceses were under the governance of one and the same bishop, aeque principaliter. It was determined that there would be only one priestly seminary for the three dioceses, in Molfetta. Molfetta remained directly subject to the Holy See.

=== Diocesan Reorganization ===
Following the Second Vatican Council, and in accordance with the norms laid out in the council's decree, Christus Dominus chapter 40, Pope Paul VI ordered a reorganization of the ecclesiastical provinces in southern Italy. He ordered consultations among the members of the Congregation of Bishops in the Vatican Curia, the Italian Bishops Conference, and the various dioceses concerned.

On 18 February 1984, the Vatican and the Italian State signed a new and revised concordat. Based on the revisions, a set of Normae was issued on 15 November 1984, which was accompanied in the next year, on 3 June 1985, by enabling legislation. According to the agreement, the practice of having one bishop govern two separate dioceses at the same time, aeque personaliter, was abolished. The Vatican continued consultations which had begun under Pope John XXIII for the merging of small dioceses, especially those with personnel and financial problems, into one combined diocese.

On 30 September 1986, Pope John Paul II ordered that the dioceses of Molfetta, Giovenazza, Terlizzi and Ruvo be merged into one diocese with one bishop, with the Latin title Dioecesis Melphictensis-Rubensis-Iuvenacensis-Terlitiensis. The seat of the diocese was to be in Molfetta, whose cathedral was to serve as the cathedral of the merged diocese. The cathedrals in Giovenazza, Terlizzi, and Ruvo were to have the honorary titles of "co-cathedral"; the Chapters were each to be a Capitulum Concathedralis. There was to be only one diocesan Tribunal, in Molfetta, and likewise one seminary, one College of Consultors, and one Priests' Council. The territory of the new diocese was to include the territory of the suppressed dioceses. The new diocese was a suffragan of the archdiocese of Bari-Bitonto.

=== Chapter and cathedral ===
Under Bishop Simon Alopa (1386–1401), the number of Canons in the Cathedral Chapter was fixed at twenty-four, reducing the number from thirty-six. In addition to the Canons there were six dignities in the Chapter, the Archdeacon, the Archpriest, two Primicerii (Cantores), the Penitentiary and the Sacristan. The current Chapter preserves these six dignities, but there are only eleven Canons and two Honorary Canons.

== Bishops ==
=== Diocese of Molfetta ===
Latin Name: Melphictensis
Erected: 12th Century

==== to 1300 ====
...

- [Anonymous] (1071)

...

- Ioannes (attested 1136)
- Riccardus (attested 1155 – 1162)

...

- Ioannes (attested 1179–1188?)
- Accarinus (attested 1205 – 1218)

...

- Risandus (attested 1222 – 1236)

...

- Richardus ( – 5 August 1271)
- Petrus (1271 – 1279)
- Angelus Saracenus de Urbe (1280 – 1287)
- Nicolaus (attested 1292)
- Paulus, O.Min. (1294 – 1307)

==== 1300 to 1600 ====
- Jacobus (attested 1321)
- Leo (attested 1344)
- Nicolaus (8 January 1375 – ? )
- Simon de Lopa (6 October 1386 – 26 March 1401)
- Ioannes Brancia (11 April 1401 – c. 1410)
- Paulus de Joviniaco (c. 1410 – 1421?)
- Pietro Piezi (18 Jul 1421 – 1427 Died)
- Gentile del Monte (28 February 1427 – 1432)
- Andreas de Rocha (16 November 1433 – 1472)
- Leonardo Palmieri (23 July 1472 – September? 1472)
- Cardinal Giovanni Battista Cibo (16 Sep 1472 – 29 Aug 1484) (Elected Pope Innocent VIII)
- Angelo Lacerti (15 Sep 1484 – 1508 Died)
- Alessio Celadoni di Celadonia (7 Jun 1508 – 1517 Died)
- Cardinal Ferdinando Ponzetti (Poncetti) (20 Apr 1517 – 12 Jul 1518 Resigned)
- Giacomo Ponzetti (Poncetti) (12 Jul 1518 – 1553 Resigned)
- Nicola Maggiorani (Majorano) (15 Dec 1553 – 13 Mar 1566 Resigned)
- Maggiorano Maggiorani (Majorano) (13 Mar 1566 – 31 Jul 1597 Died)
- Offredo de Offredi (18 May 1598 – Jun 1606 Died)

==== 1600 to 1833 ====
- Juan Antonio Bovio, O. Carm. (29 Jan 1607 – 12 Aug 1622 Died)
- Giacinto Petroni, O.P. (5 Sep 1622 – Sep 1648 Died)
- Giovanni Tommaso Pinelli, C.R. (18 May 1648 – 29 Mar 1666)
- Francesco de' Marini (29 Mar 1666 – 6 Oct 1670 Resigned)
- Carlo Loffredo, C.R. (6 Oct 1670 – 26 Nov 1691)
- Pietro Vecchia, O.S.B. (19 Dec 1691 – Jul 1695 Died)
- Domenico Belisario de Bellis (23 Jan 1696 – 17 Jan 1701 Died)
- Giovanni degli Effetti (18 Jul 1701 – 1712 Died)
- Fabrizio Antonio Salerni (17 Sep 1714 – 14 Apr 1754 Died)
- Celestino (Pietro Antonio) Orlandi, O.S.B. (16 Sep 1754 – before 8 Jul 1775 Died)
- Gennaro Antonucci (13 Nov 1775 – 21 Mar 1804 Died)
- Domenico Antonio Cimaglia (2 Oct 1818 Confirmed – Jul 1819 Died)
- Filippo Giudice Caracciolo, C.O. (21 Feb 1820 Confirmed – 15 Apr 1833)

Sede vacante (1833 – 1837)

=== Diocese of Molfetta-Giovinazzo-Terlizzi ===
Latin Name: Melphictensis-Iuvenacensis-Terlitiensis
United: 4 March 1836 with Diocese of Giovinazzo e Terlizzi
Metropolitan: Archdiocese of Bari (-Canosa)

- Giovanni Constantini (19 May 1837 – 19 Jan 1852 Died)
- Niccola Maria Guida (27 Sep 1852 – 6 Dec 1862)
- Gaetano Rossini (27 Mar 1867 – 4 Jan 1890)
- Pasquale Corrado (2 Jan 1890 – 6 Dec 1894)
- Pasquale Picone (18 Mar 1895 – 5 Sep 1917)
- Giovanni Jacono (2 Jul 1918 – 1921)
- Pasquale Gioia, C.R.S. (30 Sep 1921 – 2 Apr 1935)
- Achille Salvucci (17 Oct 1935 – 18 Mar 1978 Died)
- Aldo Garzia (18 Mar 1978 – 1982)
- Antonio Bello (10 Aug 1982 – 20 Apr 1993 Died)

=== Diocese of Molfetta-Ruvo-Giovinazzo-Terlizzi ===
Latin Name: Melphictensis-Rubensis-Iuvenacensis-Terlitiensis
United: 30 September 1986 with Diocese of Ruvo
Metropolitan: Archdiocese of Bari-Bitonto

- Donato Negro (22 Dec 1993 – 29 Apr 2000 Appointed, Archbishop of Otranto)
- Luigi Martella (13 Dec 2000 – 6 Jul 2015 Died)
- Domenico Cornacchia (15 Jan 2016 – 2026)
- Domenico Basile (9 Jan 2026 – pres.)

== Co-cathedrals ==
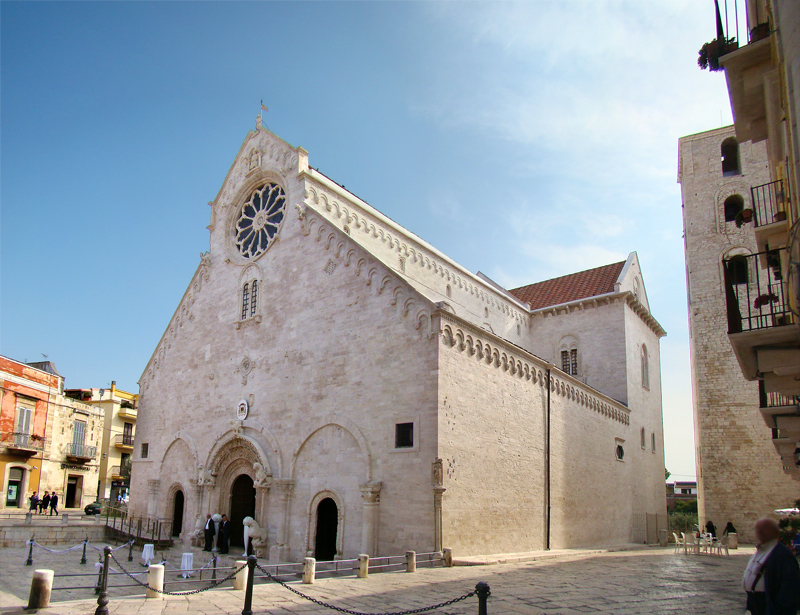
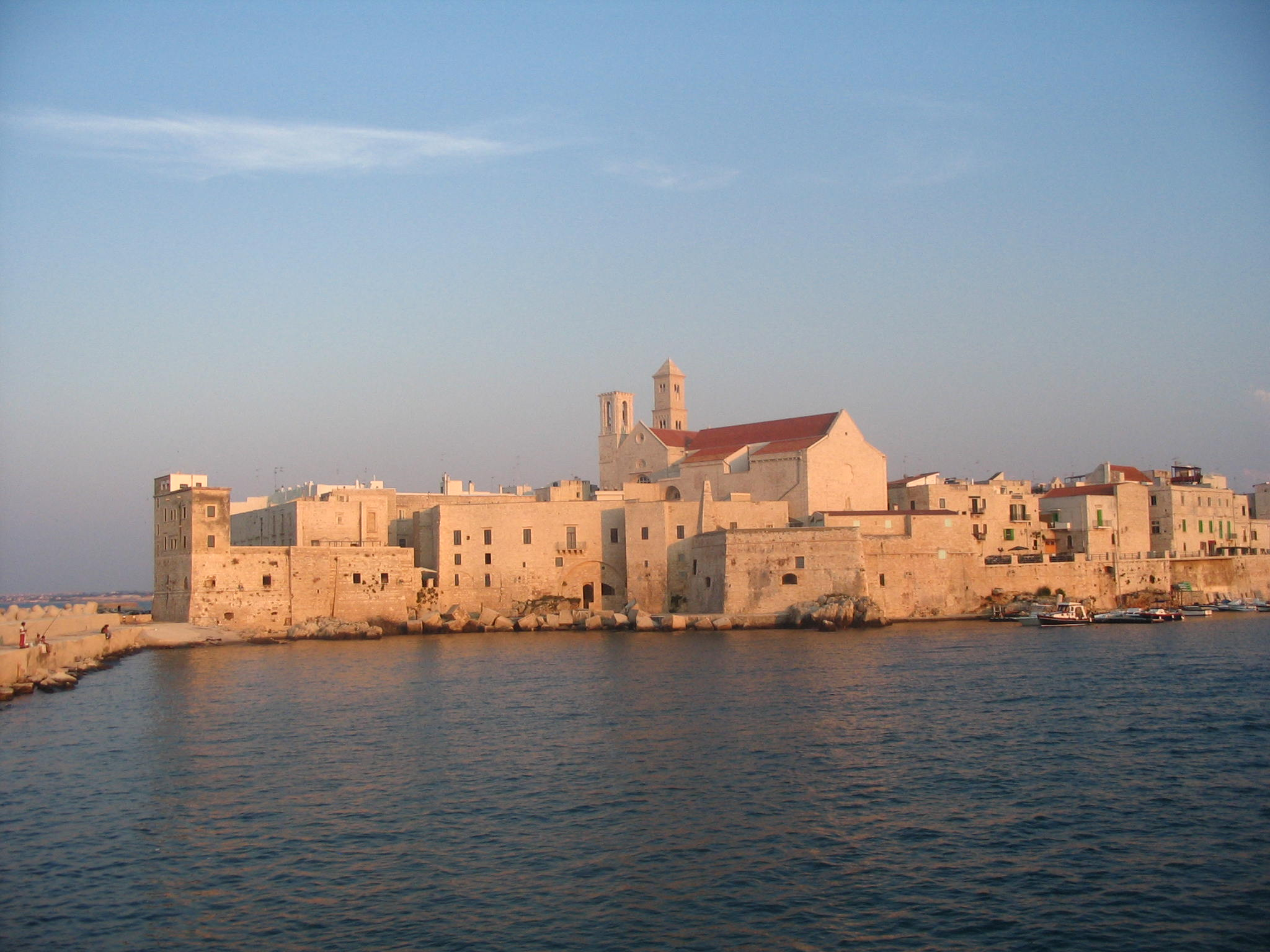
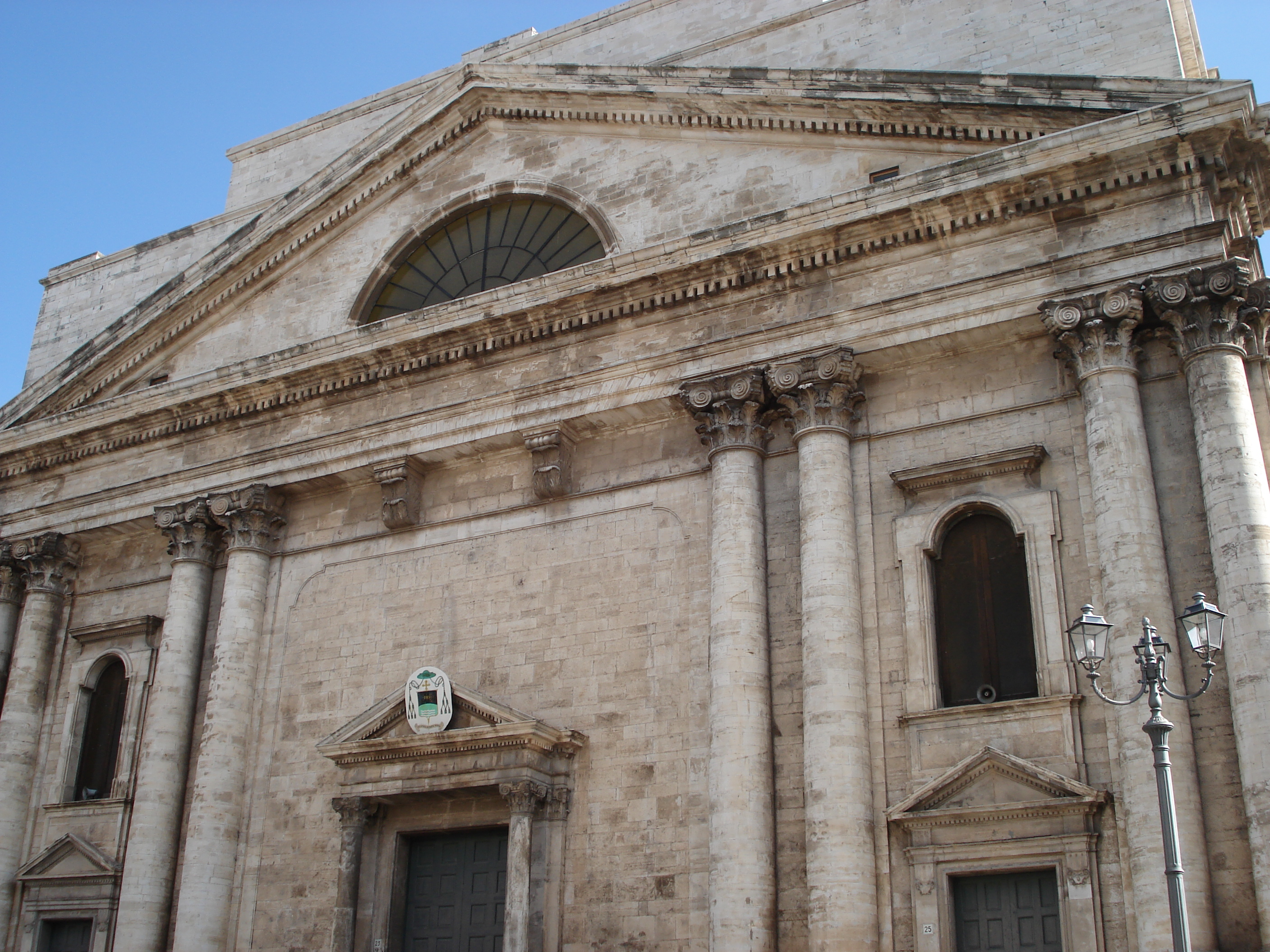
Co-cathedrals: Co-cathedral in Ruvo (left) Co-cathedral in Giovinazzo (center) Co-cathedral in Terlizzi (right)

== See also ==
- Roman Catholic Diocese of Ruvo
- Roman Catholic Diocese of Giovinazzo e Terlizzi
- Roman Catholic Diocese of Terlizzi
- Terlizzi (the commune)

== Books ==
=== Reference Works ===
- Eubel, Conradus, ed. (1913). Hierarchia catholica, Tomus 1 (second ed.). Münster: Libreria Regensbergiana. (in Latin)
- Eubel, Conradus, ed. (1914). Hierarchia catholica, Tomus 2 (second ed.). Münster: Libreria Regensbergiana. (in Latin)
- Eubel, Conradus, ed. (1923). Hierarchia catholica, Tomus 3 (second ed.). Münster: Libreria Regensbergiana.
- Gams, Pius Bonifatius (1873). Series episcoporum Ecclesiae catholicae: quotquot innotuerunt a beato Petro apostolo. Ratisbon: Typis et Sumptibus Georgii Josephi Manz. pp. 898-899. (Use with caution; obsolete)
- Gauchat, Patritius (Patrice) (1935). Hierarchia catholica IV (1592-1667). Münster: Libraria Regensbergiana. (in Latin)
- Ritzler, Remigius; Sefrin, Pirminus (1952). Hierarchia catholica medii et recentis aevi V (1667-1730). Patavii: Messagero di S. Antonio. (in Latin)
- Ritzler, Remigius; Sefrin, Pirminus (1958). Hierarchia catholica medii et recentis aevi VI (1730-1799). Patavii: Messagero di S. Antonio. (in Latin)
- Ritzler, Remigius; Sefrin, Pirminus (1968). Hierarchia Catholica medii et recentioris aevi sive summorum pontificum, S. R. E. cardinalium, ecclesiarum antistitum series... A pontificatu Pii PP. VII (1800) usque ad pontificatum Gregorii PP. XVI (1846) (in Latin). Vol. VII. Monasterii: Libr. Regensburgiana.
- Ritzler, Remigius; Pirminus Sefrin (1978). Hierarchia catholica Medii et recentioris aevi... A Pontificatu PII PP. IX (1846) usque ad Pontificatum Leonis PP. XIII (1903) (in Latin). Vol. VIII. Il Messaggero di S. Antonio.
- Pięta, Zenon (2002). Hierarchia catholica medii et recentioris aevi... A pontificatu Pii PP. X (1903) usque ad pontificatum Benedictii PP. XV (1922) (in Latin). Vol. IX. Padua: Messagero di San Antonio. ISBN 978-88-250-1000-8.

=== Studies ===
- Benigni, Umberto. "Diocese of Molfetta, Terlizzi, and Giovinazzo." The Catholic Encyclopedia. Vol. 10. New York: Robert Appleton Company, 1911. Retrieved: 17 Mar. 2017. [obsolete and unbalanced]
- Cappelletti, Giuseppe (1870). Le chiese d'Italia dalla loro origine sino ai nostri giorni (in Italian). Vol. vigesimoprimo (21). Venezia: Antonelli. pp. 394–399.
- Carabellese, Francesco (1899). La città di Molfetta dai primi anni del secolo x ai primi del xiv (in Italian). Trani: V. Vecchi.
- D'Avino, Vincenzio (1848). Cenni storici sulle chiese arcivescovili, vescovili, e prelatizie (nullius) del regno delle due Sicilie (in Italian). Naples: dalle stampe di Ranucci. pp. 341–342.
- De Palma, L.M. (1983). La sede episcopale di Molfetta nei secc. XI-XIII. (in Italian). Molfetta 1983 [Quaderni dell' Archivio diocesano di Molfetta, 5].
- De Palma, L.M. (1989). "Contributo alla storia dell’episcopato meridionale. Cronotassi dei vescovi di Molfetta (1071-1986)," (in Italian). in Rivista di Scienze Religiose, III (1989), pp. 143-161.
- Kamp, Norbert (1975). Kirche und Monarchie im staufischen Königreich Sizilien: I. Prosopographische Grundlegung, Bistumer und Bistümer und Bischöfe des Konigreichs 1194–1266: 2. Apulien und Calabrien München: Wilhelm Fink 1975.
- Kehr, Paulus Fridolin (1962). Italia pontificia. Regesta pontificum Romanorum. Vol. IX: Samnia – Apulia – Lucania. Berlin: Weidmann. (in Latin), pp. 351–352.
- Romano, Michele (1842a). Saggio sulla storia di Molfetta (in Italian). Vol. Parte prima. Napoli.
- Romano, Michele (1842b). Saggio sulla storia di Molfetta dall'epoca dell'antica Respa sino al 1840 del dottor fisico Michele Romano: 2 (in Italian). Vol. Parte seconda. Napoli: De Bonis.
- Ughelli, Ferdinando; Coleti, Niccolò (1717). Italia sacra, sive De Episcopis Italiae (in Latin). Vol. Tomus primus (I). Venice: apud Sebastianum Coleti. pp. 916–920.
