= Jean-François Foucquet =

Burgundy French Jesuit, bishop and scientist

Most Reverend Jean François Fouquet
- Titular Bishop of Eleutheropolis in Macedonia
- Church: Catholic Church
- Predecessor: Johannes Werner von Veyder

Orders
- Consecration: 25 March 1725 by Pope Benedict XIII

Personal details
- Born: 12 March 1665 Vézelay, France
- Died: 14 March 1741 (age 76)

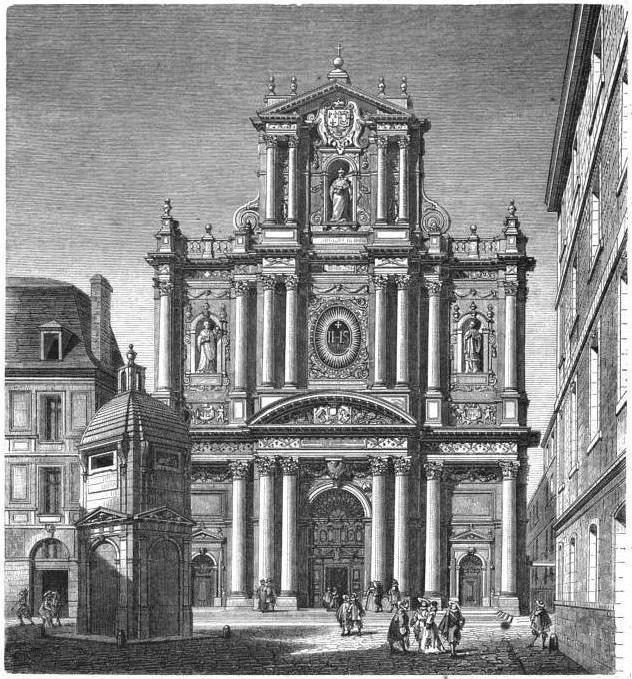
Église Saint-Paul in Le Marais

Jean-François Foucquet S.J., also Jean-François Fouquet (French: [ʒɑ̃ fʁɑ̃swa fukɛ]; 12 March 1665 – 14 March 1741), was a Burgundy French Jesuit, bishop and scientist who was active in the Jesuit China missions for 22 years. He also was Titular Bishop of Eleutheropolis in Macedonia (1725–1741).

== Life ==
Fouquet was born in Vézelay in a wealthy family. He studied at Lycée Louis le Grand in Paris. In 1681 he entered the order of the Jesuits. Four years later he taught mathematics. In 1693 he became a priest and in the following year he decided he wanted to volunteer in Asia. In 1699 he arrived in Amoy. Until 1711 he worked in Fujian and Jiangxi, then he was invited to Peking, to teach math and astronomy. He left hurriedly in 1720 with 1200 manuscripts. In Canton he had to wait one year for a French ship. He returned to Europe in 1722.

Fouquet had taken with him a Chinese man, named Jean Hu (Hu Ruowang 胡若望), who liked Paris and got lost in Quartier Latin. Hu preached for a while in the Chinese language in front of Saint-Paul-Saint-Louis, attracting a crowd. Fouquet decided to go to Rome and planned to take Hu with him; Hu did not like to travel by stagecoach, got furious and preferred to go by foot. When Fouquet set off by himself, Hu was taken with a lettre de cachet to an asylum in Charenton, etc.

On 8 June 1723, Fouquet was received by Pope Innocent XIII. Fouquet met another Chinese in Rome, who offered him help with translating. In 1725 he was appointed as bishop of Eleutheropolis in Macedonia by Pope Benedict XIII, with Giovanni Francesco Nicolai, Titular Archbishop of Myra, and Giacinto Gaetano Chiurlia, Bishop of Giovinazzo, serving as co-consecrators. He remained as Titular Bishop of Eleutheropolis in Macedonia until his death on 14 March 1741.

While bishop, he was the principal co-consecrator of Antoine-Joseph-Amable Feydeau, Bishop of Digne (1730); and Domenico Maria Salvini, Archbishop of Nachitschewan (1732).

He published the Tabula Chronologica Historiæ Sinicæ ("Chronological table of Chinese History"). Foucquet, a Figurist, endeavoured to show that the Book of changes (I Ching) anticipated the coming of Jesus Christ.

== Works ==
- De la Doctrine et des Livres des Chinois
- Tabula Chronologica Historiæ Sinicæ Connexa cum Cyclo qui vulgo Kia-Tse dicitur

== Notes ==
Catholic Church titles
Preceded by Johannes Werner von Veyder	Titular Bishop of Eleutheropolis in Macedonia; 1725–1741	Succeeded by
