= Marcello Planca =

Most Reverend Marcello Planca
- Bishop of Giovinazzo
- Church: Catholic Church
- Diocese: Diocese of Giovinazzo
- In office: 1517–1528
- Predecessor: Lorenzo Pucci
- Successor: Ludovico Furconio

Personal details
- Died: 1528 Giovinazzo, Italy

Marcello Planca (died 1528) was a Roman Catholic prelate who served as Bishop of Giovinazzo (1517–1528).

== Biography ==
On 21 August 1517, Marcello Planca was appointed by Pope Leo X as Bishop of Giovinazzo. He served as Bishop of Giovinazzo until his death in 1528.

== External links and additional sources ==
- Cheney, David M. "Diocese of Giovinazzo e Terlizzi". Catholic-Hierarchy.org. (for Chronology of Bishops) ^{[self-published]}
- Chow, Gabriel. "Diocese of Giovinazzo (Italy)". GCatholic.org. (for Chronology of Bishops) ^{[self-published]}

Catholic Church titles
| Preceded by Lorenzo Pucci | Bishop of Giovinazzo; 1517–1528 | Succeeded by Ludovico Furconio |
