= Camporeale (surname) =

Camporeale is a surname. Notable people with the surname include:

- Enzo Camporeale (born 1966), Italian pianist, composer, and vocalist
- Scott Camporeale (born 1975), Australian rules footballer
