= Antonio Bello =

Italian Roman Catholic bishop

Venerable Antonio Bello TOFS
- Bishop of Molfetta-Ruvo-Giovinazzo-Terlizzi
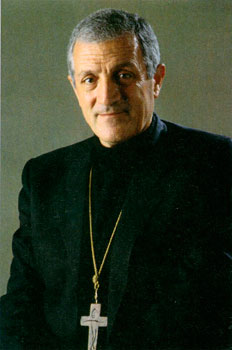
- Bello in 1982
- Church: Roman Catholic Church
- Diocese: Molfetta-Ruvo-Giovinazzo-Terlizzi
- See: Molfetta-Ruvo-Giovinazzo-Terlizzi
- Appointed: 10 August 1982
- Installed: 21 November 1982
- Term ended: 20 April 1993
- Predecessor: Aldo Garzia
- Successor: Donato Negro
- Other post: President of Pax Christi (1985–1993)
- Previous posts: Bishop of Molfetta (1982–1986); Bishop of Ruvo (1982–1986)

Orders
- Ordination: 8 December 1957 by Giuseppe Ruotolo
- Consecration: 30 October 1982 by Michele Mincuzzi

Personal details
- Born: Antonio Bello; 18 March 1935 Alessano, Lecce, Kingdom of Italy
- Died: 20 April 1993 (aged 58) Molfetta, Bari, Italy
- Buried: Cimitero Comunale di Alessano, Italy
- Education: University of Lecce; Pontifical Lateran University
- Motto: Audiant et lætentur ("Hear and rejoice")
- Coat of arms: Antonio Bello's coat of arms

Ordination history of Antonio Bello
History
Diaconal ordination
- Ordained by: Giacomo Lercaro
Priestly ordination
- Ordained by: Giuseppe Ruotolo
Episcopal consecration
- Principal consecrator: Michele Mincuzzi
- Co-consecrators: Aldo Garzia; Mario Miglietta

Antonio Bello (18 March 1935 – 20 April 1993) was an Italian Catholic prelate who served as the Bishop of Molfetta-Ruvo-Giovinazzo-Terlizzi from 1982 until his death from cancer in 1993. Bello studied in various colleges and seminaries in places such as Bologna and Rome before being named to several positions in his region where he served as a priest. He was later made a bishop and became known for his eloquent teaching and for his pastoral sensitivities while being noted for his emphasis on greater diocesan participation on the part of the faithful. Bello also was a member of the Secular Franciscan Order and was a vocal critic of international conflicts such as the Gulf War.

Bello's beatification cause opened over a decade after his death and he became titled as a Servant of God. Pope Francis named him as Venerable on 25 November 2021.

== Life ==
=== Childhood and education ===
Antonio Bello was born in Alessano, Province of Lecce on 18 March 1935 at 12:10 am on Via Scipione Sangiovanni as the first of three children to the Carabinieri marshal Tommaso Bello, who died on 29 January 1942, and the housewife Maria Imperato; he was baptized in the church of SS. Salvatore in Alessano on 15 April and received Confirmation in the same church on 8 June 1941. His parents married on 8 March 1934. His two brothers (in order) were Trifone and Marcello.

His mother was later hired after she became a widow in Lucugnano in manufacturing tobacco products. His uncle Antonuccio encouraged Bello to keep a journal to record his thoughts and was an influence on him as were his uncles Totò and Pippi. His aunts Flora and Maria in addition to Elvira and Assunta were also formative influences on him during his childhood. His father – who died in 1942 from a heart attack – had been a widower with two children Giacinto and Vittorio who both died during World War II. Giacinto died of a heart attack in Milan on 3 October 1944 and Vittorio died on 9 September 1943 on board the sinking battleship Roma.

He attended school first in his hometown from 1940 to 1945 and then entered the seminaries in Ugento (1940–1948) and Molfetta from 1950 to 1953 at the Pontifico Seminario Regionale Pio XI (he applied for admission to do his high school studies on 13 August 1950). He later attended the Opera Nazionale Assistenza Religiosa e Morale degli Operai for additional studies from September 1953 in Bologna. From 1953 until 1957, he attended a series of theological courses at the Pontifico Seminario Regionale Benedetto XV there in Bologna.

=== Priesthood ===
On 30 November 1955, he received the minor orders (from Cardinal Giacomo Lercaro) and he later was inducted into the subdiaconate on 22 December 1957 (this timeline cannot be correct). Bello was later elevated to the diaconate (also from Lercaro) on 7 July 1957. Bello received his ordination to the priesthood on 8 December 1957, from Bishop Giuseppe Ruotolo in the church of SS. Salvatore in Alessano. On 1 November 1958 he was appointed as the vice-rector for seminarians in Ugento and later on 26 June 1959, obtained a licentiate in sacred theological studies from the Facoltà teologica dell'Italia Settentrionale and another licentiate in Bologna on 4 November. He enrolled in a philosophical course and a literature course in the college in Lecce on 30 April 1962. Bello later attended the Pontifical Lateran in Rome from 20 October 1962 until 3 July 1965 (accepting Bishop Ruotolo's invitation to do so) when he obtained his degree. On 3 March 1965, he defended his doctoral thesis entitled "The Eucharistic Congresses and their theological and pastoral significance". On 7 March 1968 he became a Monsignor after being named as a Chaplain of His Holiness. From 1969, he served as an assistant to the Catholic Action organization. On 30 September 1976 he was promoted as rector in Ugento.

On 1 October 1977, he was named as the administrator for the Sacred Heart parish in Ugento before being appointed as a parish priest in Tricase on 1 January 1979 which was a position he held until his episcopal nomination. In this time he collaborated with the Caritas Internationalis organization.

=== Episcopate ===
In 1982, Pope John Paul II appointed him as the Bishop of Molfetta and the Bishop of Ruvo. He received his episcopal consecration on 30 October 1982 and he assumed the name "Tonino" after his consecration. The co-consecrators were Aldo Garzia and Mario Miglietta. The unification of his dioceses saw him retained as its bishop on 30 September 1986. In 1982, after his appointment he travelled to Rome and met the President Sandro Pertini who was impressed with the new bishop. In response Bello gave Pertini his pectoral cross. Bello was enthroned in Molfetta on 21 November 1982 but was enthroned in Giovinazzo on 28 November before two more installations in Terlizzi (5 December) and Ruvo (8 December). In 1985, he established a center to treat drug addiction. Bello also made a visit to Australia as well as to the Latin American countries Argentina and Venezuela to visit immigrants from his diocese.

He was selected as the President for Pax Christi in 1985 and held that position until his death; the president of the Italian Episcopal Conference Cardinal Anastasio Alberto Ballestrero appointed him to that post to succeed Bishop Luigi Bettazzi. Bello was also an outspoken critic of the Gulf War and other international conflicts. He further railed against NATO, after the organization decided to install bombers in Apulia. Bello attended a peaceful march on Sarajevo on 7 December 1992; he left with 500 others from Ancona to the Dalmatian coast to begin the march which culminated in arriving in Sarajevo in bad weather and fog.

Bishop Bello dreamed that the Church could be called "the Church of the apron" and he said this because he believed that the apron represented the sole vestment that could be attributed to Jesus Christ. He added that Jesus removed his outer garments to take a towel which he fastened to his waist. Bello was noted for his frugal manner of living; he took the bus and often rode a bike since he disliked cars due to their pollution. Bello interacted with people in the streets and often in bars and restaurants. Bello at some point became professed into the Secular Franciscan Order. In September 1990 he founded the "Mosaico di Pace" magazine in Molfetta and from 1990 to 1992 wrote articles for the newspaper "Il manifesto".

=== Death ===
He died from stomach cancer in Molfetta on 20 April 1993 looking at a picture of the Mother of God; his remains were buried in the Cimitero Comunale di Alessano after his funeral held on 24 April. His last public appearance was in a wheelchair in the diocesan cathedral for the chrism Mass on 8 April which he spoke at. He was fatigued after the Mass due to the aggravating nature of his disease. On 18 March 2015 the Capuchin friars in Giovinazzo inaugurated a state dedicated to Bello in the presence of the late bishop's brother Marcello.

== Beatification process ==
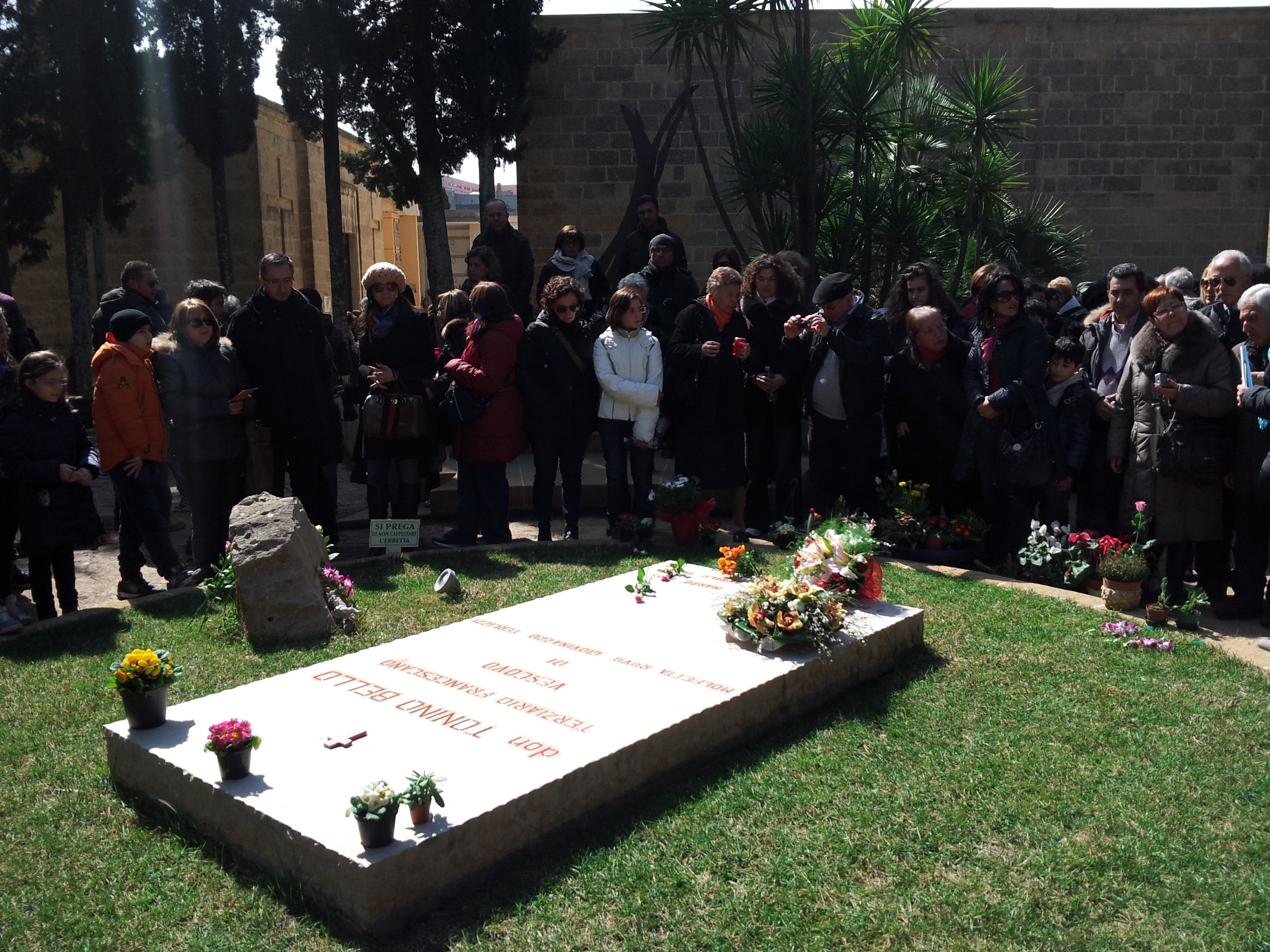
Tomb in Molfetta.

The beatification process opened under Pope Benedict XVI on 27 November 2007 after the Congregation for the Causes of Saints issued the official "nihil obstat" (no objections to the cause) edict and titled Bello as a Servant of God. The diocesan bishop for Molfetta later issued an edict on 20 April 2008 which introduced the diocesan investigation which was opened on 30 April 2010; this investigation was later closed on 30 November 2013. The C.C.S. in Rome later validated the investigation on 17 April 2015. Pope Francis confirmed Bello's heroic virtue and awarded him the title Venerable on 25 November 2021.

The first postulator for this cause until 2014 was Archbishop Agostino Superbo and the first vice-postulator until 2014 was Monsignor Domenico Amato. The current postulator for the cause (since 21 June 2014) is Monsignor Luigi M. de Palma and the relator for the cause (appointed on 26 June 2015 and who is assigned to draft the Positio dossier) is Fr. Maurizio Tagliaferri.

== See also ==
- List of people declared venerable by Pope Francis
- Roman Catholic Diocese of Molfetta-Ruvo-Giovinazzo-Terlizzi
- Streetwise priest
