= Angelo Marcuzzi =

Roman Catholic bishop

Most Reverend Angelo Marcuzzi
- Bishop of Telese
- Church: Catholic Church
- Diocese: Diocese of Telese
- In office: 1413–1453

Orders
- Consecration: 5 March 1413 by Benedetto de Pradosso

Personal details
- Died: 1453

Angelo Marcuzzi (died 1453) was a Roman Catholic prelate who served as Bishop of Telese (1413–1453).

== Biography ==
On 20 January 1413, Angelo Marcuzzi was appointed during the papacy of Pope Gregory XII as Bishop of Telese. On 5 March 1413, he was consecrated bishop by Benedetto de Pradosso, Bishop of Capri, with Angelo de Consilio, Bishop of Acerra, Grimaldo Turculis, Bishop of Giovinazzo, and Pietro de Gattula, Bishop of Sant'Agata de' Goti, serving as co-consecrators. He served as Bishop of Telese until his death in 1453.

== See also ==
- Catholic Church in Italy

== External links and additional sources ==
- Cheney, David M. "Diocese of Cerreto Sannita-Telese-Sant'Agata de' Goti". Catholic-Hierarchy.org. (Chronology of Bishops) ^{[self-published]}
- Chow, Gabriel. "Diocese of Cerreto Sannita-Telese-Sant'Agata de' Goti". GCatholic.org. (Chronology of Bishops) ^{[self-published]}

Catholic Church titles
Preceded by	Bishop of Telese; 1413–1453	Succeeded by
