= Benedetto de Pradosso =

Most Reverend Benedetto de Pradosso
- Bishop of Ravello
- Church: Catholic Church
- Diocese: Diocese of Ravello
- In office: 1418–1432

Personal details
- Died: 1432 Ravello, Italy

Benedetto de Pradosso (died 1432) was a Roman Catholic prelate who served as Bishop of Ravello (1418–1432) and Bishop of Capri (1398–1418).

== Biography ==
On 10 December 1398, Benedetto de Pradosso was appointed during the papacy of Pope Martin V as Bishop of Capri. On 16 February 1418, he was appointed during the papacy of Pope Eugene IV as Bishop of Ravello. He served as Bishop of Ravello until his death in 1432. While bishop, he was the principal consecrator of Angelo Marcuzzi, Bishop of Telese o Cerreto Sannita (1413).

== External links and additional sources ==
- Cheney, David M. "Diocese of Capri". Catholic-Hierarchy.org. (for Chronology of Bishops) ^{[self-published]}
- Chow, Gabriel. "Titular Episcopal See of Capri (Italy)". GCatholic.org. (for Chronology of Bishops) ^{[self-published]}
- Cheney, David M. "Diocese of Ravello e Scala". Catholic-Hierarchy.org. (for Chronology of Bishops) ^{[self-published]}
- Chow, Gabriel. "Titular Episcopal See of Ravello (Italy)". GCatholic.org. (for Chronology of Bishops) ^{[self-published]}

Catholic Church titles
Preceded by	Bishop of Capri; 1398–1418	Succeeded by
Preceded by	Bishop of Ravello; 1418–1432	Succeeded by
