= Molfetta Cathedral =

Coordinates: 41°12′15″N 16°35′59″E

- Church of the Assumption of Mary and St Ignatius of Loyola
- Chiesa di Santa Maria Assunta e Sant'Ignazio di Loyola
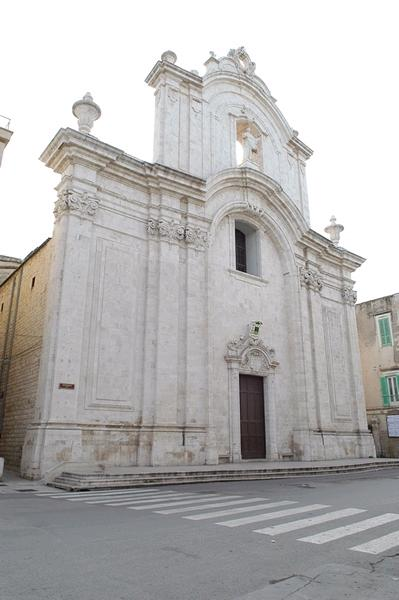
- Molfetta Cathedral, western façade
- Molfetta Cathedral
- Location: Molfetta, Bari, Apulia
- Country: Italy
- Denomination: Roman Catholic

History
- Status: Cathedral
- Dedication: Assumption of Mary & St. Ignatius of Loyola

Architecture
- Style: Baroque
- Groundbreaking: 1610
- Completed: 1744

Administration
- Diocese: Diocese of Molfetta-Ruvo-Giovinazzo-Terlizzi

Molfetta Cathedral, otherwise the Church of the Assumption and of Saint Ignatius Loyola (Italian: Duomo di Molfetta, Cattedrale or Chiesa di Santa Maria Assunta e Sant'Ignazio di Loyola), is a Roman Catholic cathedral in Molfetta (the "new cathedral"), dedicated to the Assumption of the Virgin Mary and Saint Ignatius Loyola. Originally a Jesuit church, it became the seat of the bishops of Molfetta in the late 18th century. Since 1986 it has been the episcopal seat of the Diocese of Molfetta-Ruvo-Giovinazzo-Terlizzi.

== History and description ==
The present cathedral was built by the Jesuits during the 17th century and dedicated to their founder, Saint Ignatius Loyola. Begun in 1610, it was not completed until 1744 with the construction of the façade, which bears the image of Loyola. At the suppression of the Society of Jesus in 1767 the church was abandoned until 1785, when it was restored and extended and made into the new cathedral of the diocese of Molfetta, when the relics of the patron saint of the city, Saint Conrad of Bavaria (San Corrado), were translated to it from the previous cathedral ("duomo vecchio" or the "old cathedral"), which is now the church of San Corrado.

Among the works of art in the cathedral are the Dormitio Mariae ("Dormition of Mary") attributed to Scacco (16th century), the monument of the Molfettese naturalist and historian Giuseppe Maria Giovene, to the left of the altar dedicated to Saint Conrad, and on it, the magnificent canvas by Corrado Giaquinto of the Assumption of the Virgin Mary. In 1887 the ceiling vault was decorated in tempera by the Molfettese painter Michele Romano.

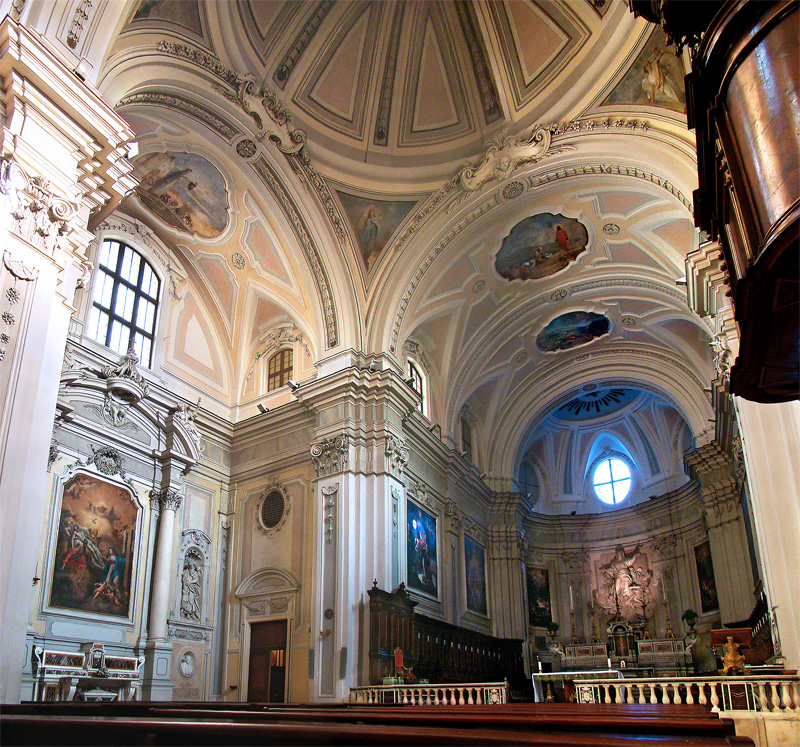
Interior

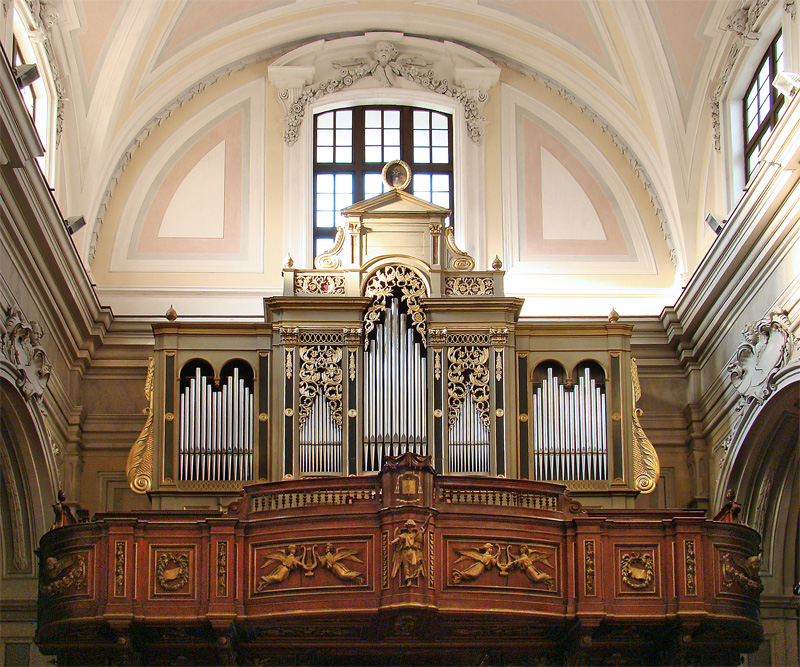
Organ

== Bibliography ==
- Cattedrali di Puglia. Una storia lunga duemila anni (ed. Cosimo Damiano Fonseca). Mario Adda Editore: Bari. 2001
