= Angelo de Consilio =

Most Reverend Angelo de Consilio
- Bishop of Acerra
- Church: Catholic Church
- Diocese: Diocese of Acerra
- In office: 1403–1429
- Predecessor: Tommaso
- Successor: Filippo

Personal details
- Died: 1429 Acerra, Italy

Angelo de Consilio or Angelo de Conciliis (died 1429) was a Roman Catholic prelate who served as Bishop of Acerra (1403–1429).

== Biography ==
On 30 July 1403, Angelo de Consilio was appointed Bishop of Acerra by Pope Boniface IX. He served as Bishop of Acerra until his death in 1429.

While bishop, he was the principal co-consecrator of Angelo Marcuzzi, Bishop of Telese o Cerreto Sannita (1413).

== See also ==
- Catholic Church in Italy

Catholic Church titles
Preceded by Tommaso	Bishop of Acerra; 1403–1429	Succeeded by Filippo
