= Giovinazzo railway station =

Railway station in Giovinazzo, Italy

Giovinazzo
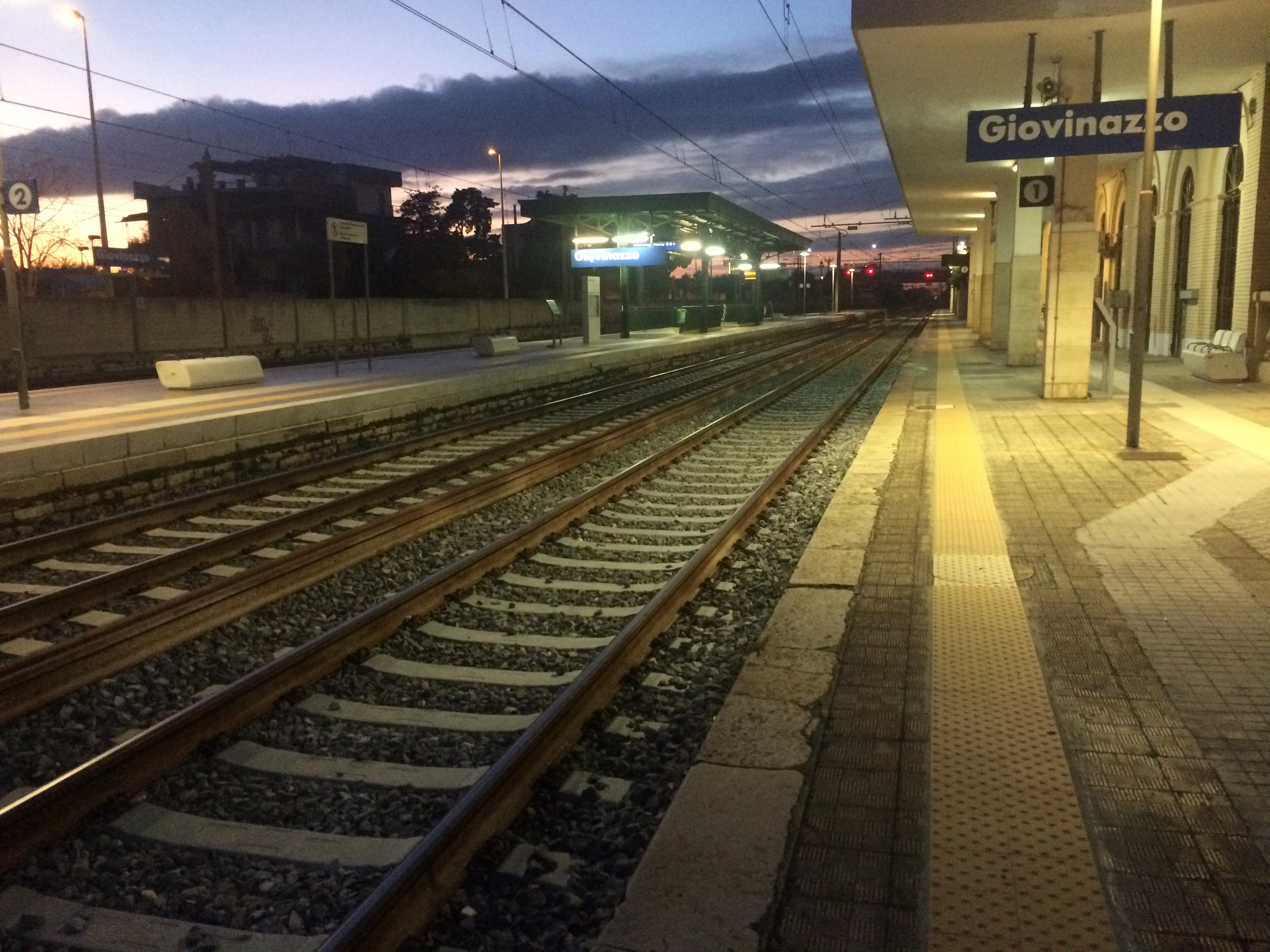
- Giovinazzo railway station in a wintry afternoon

General information
- Location: Giovinazzo; Giovinazzo, Bari, Apulia; Italy
- Coordinates: 41°10′51″N 16°40′08″E
- Operator: Rete Ferroviaria Italiana
- Line: Ancona–Lecce (Trenitalia)
- Platforms: 4
- Train operators: Trenitalia

Other information
- Classification: Silver
Location
- Location within Apulia Location within Italy

Giovinazzo (Italian: Stazione di Giovinazzo) is a railway station in the Italian town of Giovinazzo, in the Province of Bari, Apulia. The station lies on the Adriatic Railway (Ancona–Lecce). The train services are operated by Trenitalia.

== Train services ==
The station is served by the following service(s):

- Regional services (Treno regionale) Foggia - Barletta - Bari

== See also ==
- Railway stations in Italy
- List of railway stations in Apulia
- Rail transport in Italy
- History of rail transport in Italy
