= Roman Catholic Diocese of Terlizzi =

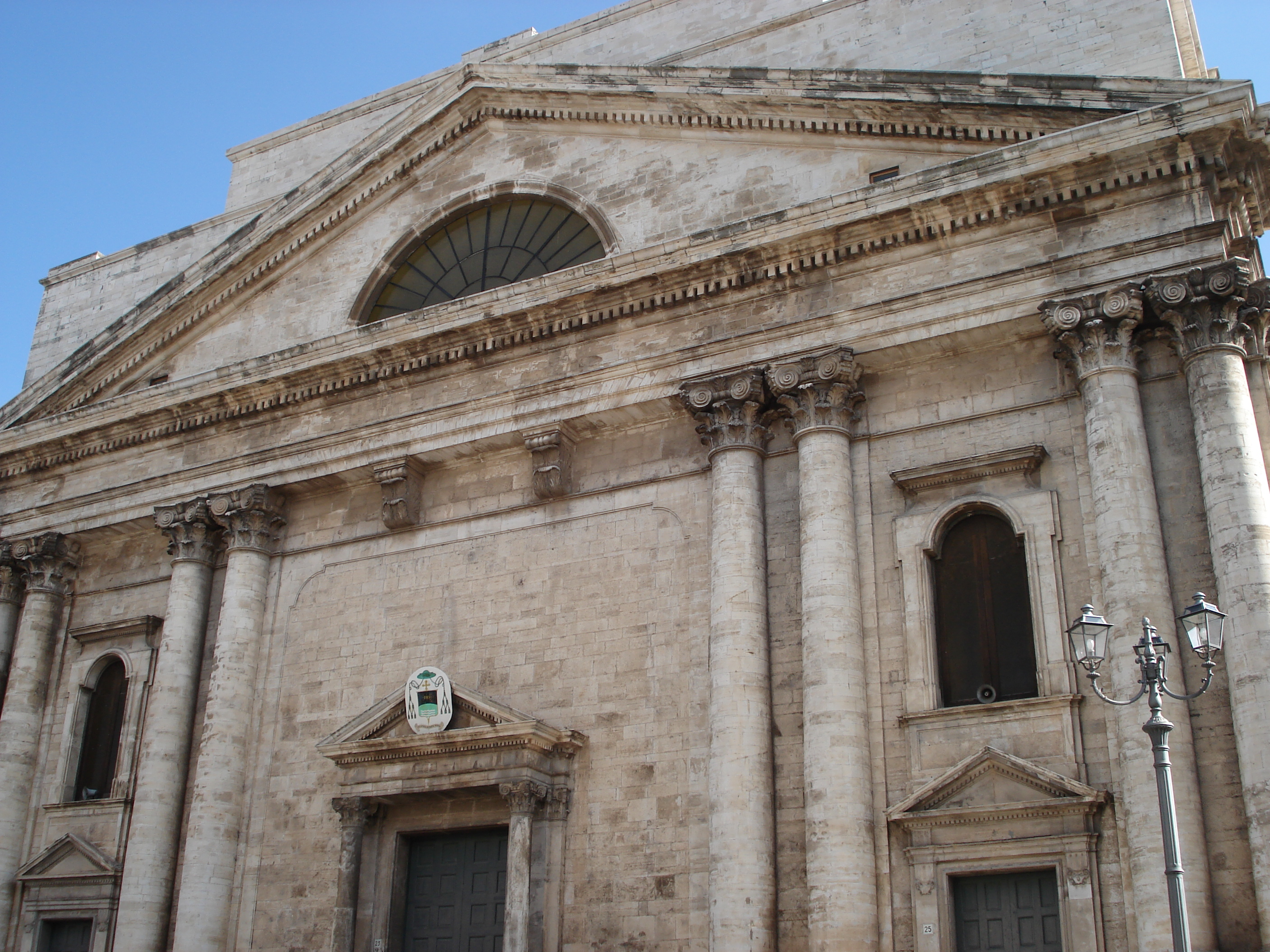
The co-cathedral of Terlizzi

The Diocese of Terlizzi (Latin: Dioecesis Terlitiensis) was a Roman Catholic diocese located in the town of Terlizzi the region of Apulia in southern Italy, in the province of Bari, lying to the west of the seaport of Bari on the Adriatic Sea. The diocese of Giovinazzo, which included the town (oppidum) of Terlizzi, was erected in the 11th century.

== History ==
In 1749, the diocese of Terlizzi was established, and was united with the Diocese of Giovinazzo, to form the Diocese of Giovinazzo e Terlizzi.

=== After Napoleon ===
Following the extinction of the Napoleonic Kingdom of Italy, the Congress of Vienna authorized the restoration of the Papal States and the Kingdom of Naples. Since the French occupation had seen the abolition of many Church institutions in the Kingdom, as well as the confiscation of most Church property and resources, it was imperative that Pope Pius VII and King Ferdinand IV reach agreement on restoration and restitution.

A concordat was finally signed on 16 February 1818, and ratified by Pius VII on 25 February 1818. Ferdinand issued the concordat as a law on 21 March 1818. The right of the king to nominate the candidate for a vacant bishopric was recognized, as in the Concordat of 1741, subject to papal confirmation (preconisation). On 27 June 1818, Pius VII issued the bull De Ulteriore, in which, among many other things, he dealt with dioceses which had been directly subject to the Holy See. The decision was made to suppress permanently the united dioceses of Giovinazzo and Terlizzi, once the current incumbent had vacated the seats, and to incorporate the two dioceses into the diocese of Molfetta.

On 4 March 1836, Pope Gregory XVI, in the bull "Aeterni Patris", united the dioceses of Giovenazzo and Terlizzi with the diocese of Molfetta. It was determined that there would be only one priestly seminary for the three dioceses, in Molfetta. Molfetta remained directly subject to the Holy See.

== Bishops of Goivenazzo e Terlizzi ==
- Paolo de Mercurio (1731 – 1752)
- Giuseppe Orlandi, O.S.B. (24 Apr 1752 - 15 Apr 1776 Died)
- Michele Continisi (16 Dec 1776 - May 1810 Died)
- Domenico Antonio Cimaglia (25 May 1818 - 2 October 1818)

== See also ==
- Roman Catholic Diocese of Giovinazzo e Terlizzi
- Roman Catholic Diocese of Molfetta-Ruvo-Giovinazzo-Terlizzi
- Terlizzi (the commune)

== Bibliography ==
=== Episcopal lists ===
- Gams, Pius Bonifatius (1873). Series episcoporum Ecclesiae catholicae: quotquot innotuerunt a beato Petro apostolo (in Latin). Ratisbon: Typis et Sumptibus Georgii Josephi Manz. p. 883.
- Ritzler, Remigius; Sefrin, Pirminus (1952). Hierarchia catholica medii et recentis aevi V (1667-1730). Patavii: Messagero di S. Antonio.
- Ritzler, Remigius; Sefrin, Pirminus (1958). Hierarchia catholica medii et recentis aevi VI (1730-1799). Patavii: Messagero di S. Antonio.
- Ritzler, Remigius; Sefrin, Pirminus (1968). Hierarchia Catholica medii et recentioris aevi (in Latin). Vol. VII (1800–1846). Monasterii: Libreria Regensburgiana.

=== Studies ===
- Cappelletti, Giuseppe (1870). Le chiese d'Italia dalla loro origine sino ai nostri giorni (in Italian). Vol. vigesimoprimo (21). Venezia: Antonelli. pp. 399–405.
- Ughelli, Ferdinando; Coleti, NIccolo (1721). Italia sacra sive De episcopis Italiæ, et insularum adjacentium (in Latin). Vol. Tomus septimus (7). Venice: apud Sebastianum Coleti. pp. 722–740.
