= Interpretatio Christiana =

Adaptation of non-Christian elements into Christianity

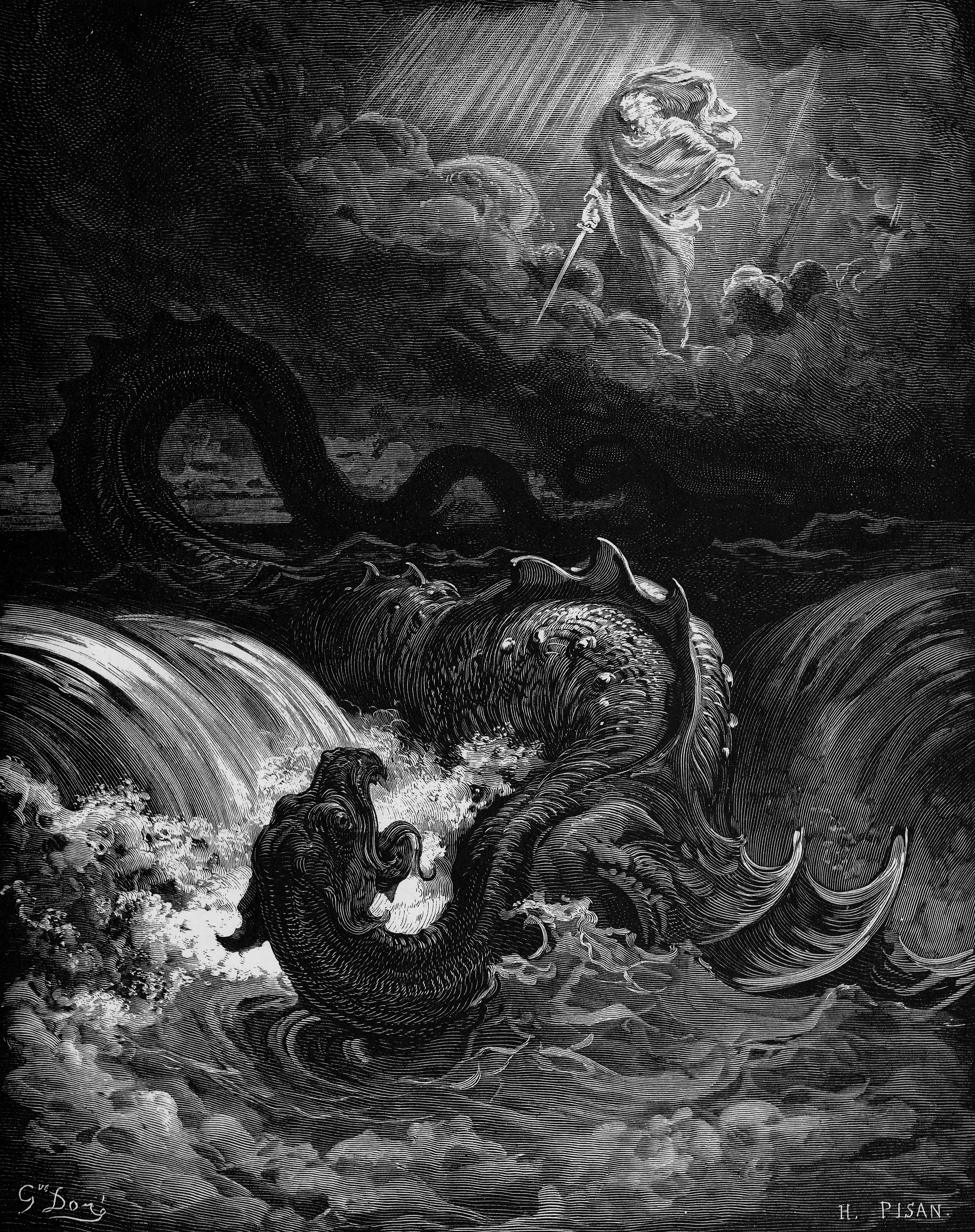
The biblical sea monster Leviathan may be traced to various pre-Christian and pre-Judaism lore.

Interpretatio Christiana (Latin for Christian interpretation, also Christian reinterpretation) is adaptation of non-Christian elements of culture or historical facts to the worldview of Christianity. The term is commonly applied to recasting of religious and cultural activities, beliefs and imageries of "pagan" peoples into a Christianized form as a strategy for Christianization. From a Christian perspective, "pagan" refers to the various religious beliefs and practices of those who adhered to non-Abrahamic faiths, including within the Greco-Roman world the traditional public and domestic religion of ancient Rome, imperial cult, Hellenistic religion, Cult of Dionysus, the ancient Egyptian religion, Celtic and Germanic polytheism, initiation religions such as the Eleusinian Mysteries and Mithraism, the religions of the ancient Near East, and the Zoroastrianism.

Reformatting traditional religious and cultural activities and beliefs into a Christianized form was officially sanctioned; preserved in the Venerable Bede's Historia ecclesiastica gentis Anglorum is a letter from Pope Gregory I to Mellitus, arguing that conversions were easier if people were allowed to retain the outward forms of their traditions while changing the object of their veneration to God, "to the end that, whilst some gratifications are outwardly permitted them, they may the more easily consent to the inward consolations of the grace of God".

== Practices ==
=== Reinterpretation of sacred sites ===
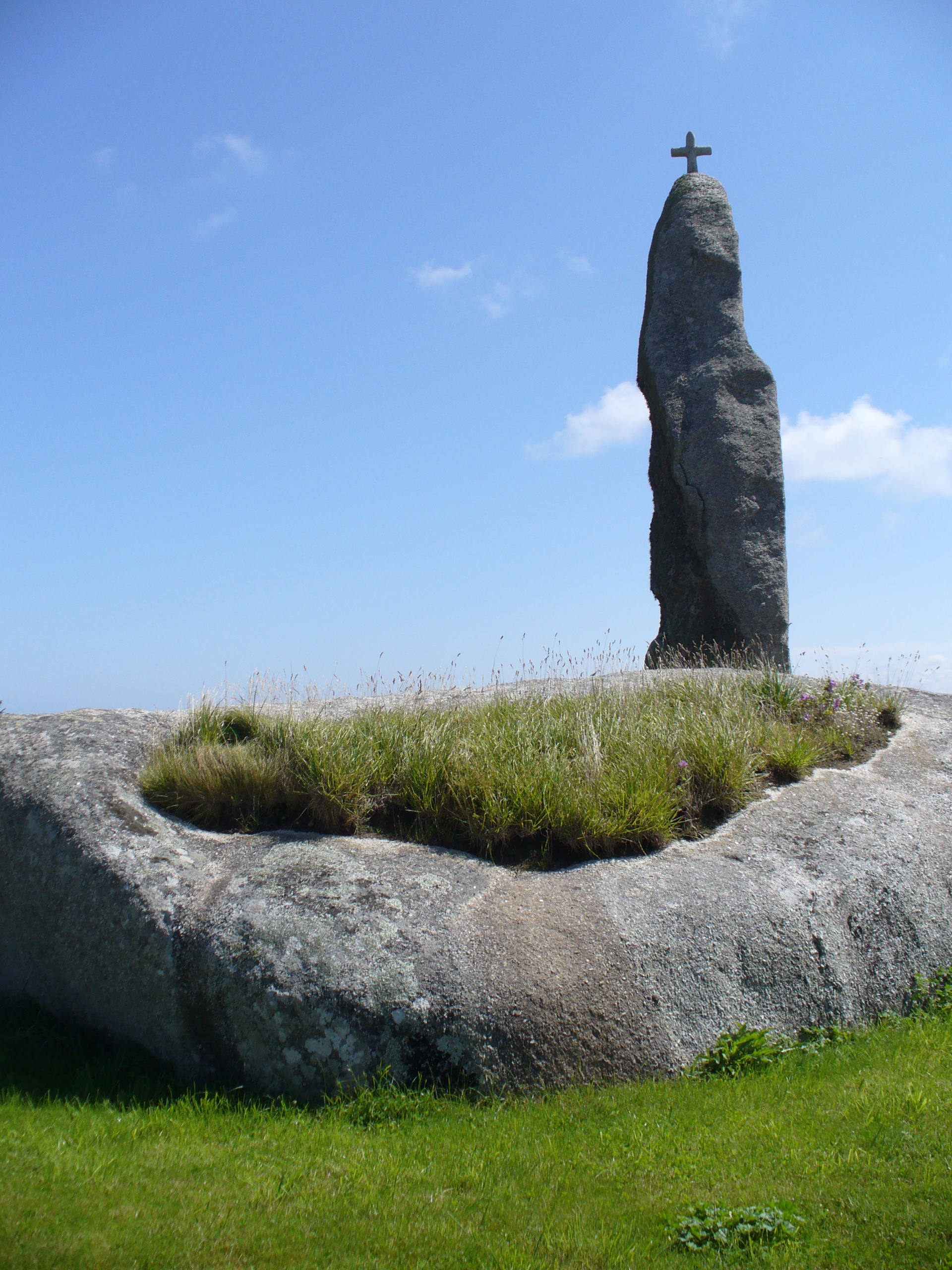
A menhir in Brittany topped with a cross

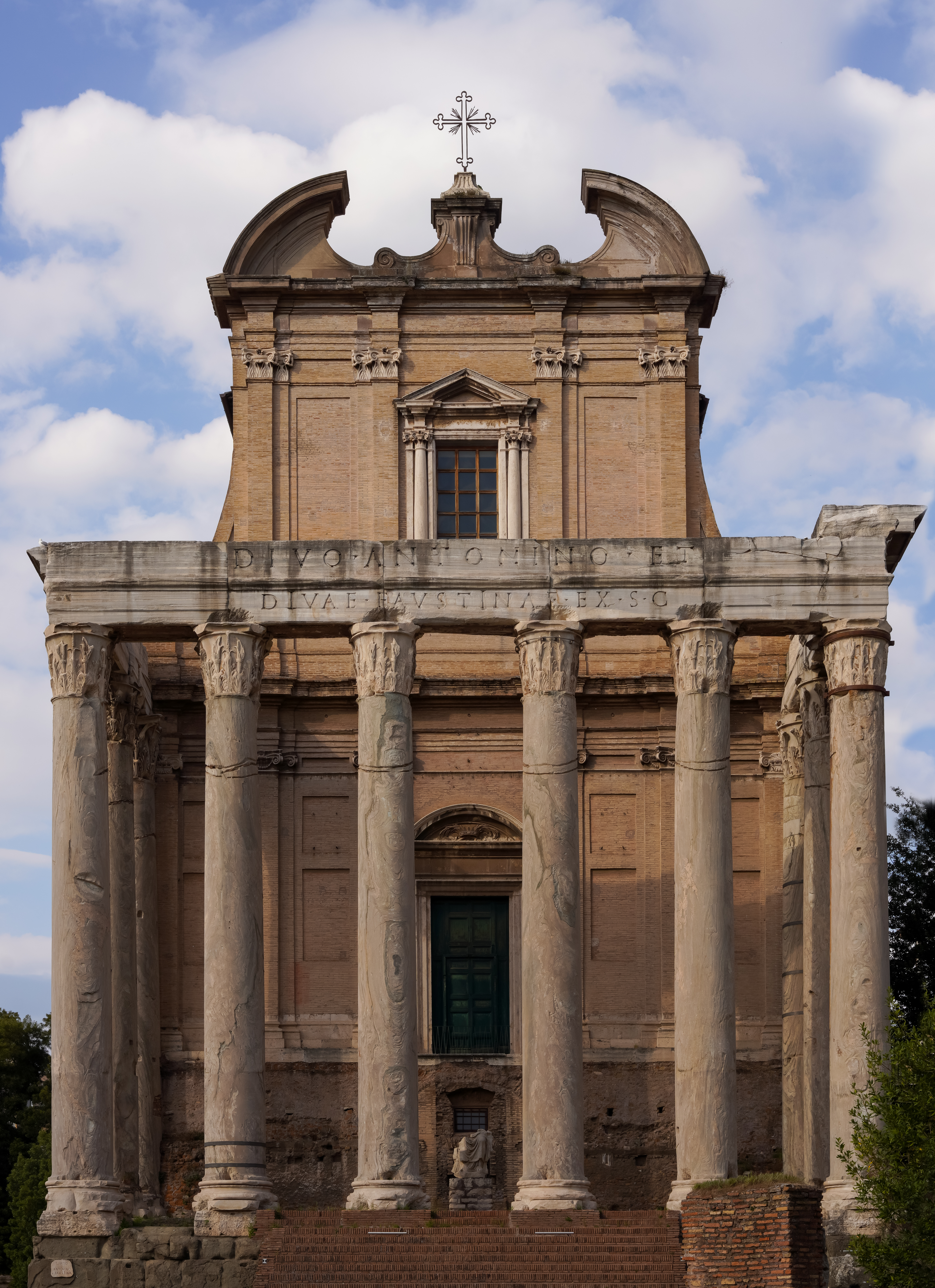
Selective conservation of pagan sites: San Lorenzo in Miranda occupies the Temple of Antoninus and Faustina, Rome, conserving the pronaos

The Christianization of sites that had been pagan occurred both as a result of spontaneous conversions in early Christian times, and an important part of the strategy of Interpretatio Christiana. The landscape itself was Christianized, as prominent features were rededicated to Christian saints, sometimes quite directly, as when the island of Oglasa in the Tyrrhenian Sea was christened Montecristo.

Missionaries to the pagan nations enthusiastically turned pagan sites immediately over to church use. For example, Sulpicius Severus, in his Vita of Martin of Tours, a dedicated destroyer of temples and sacred trees, remarks "wherever he destroyed heathen temples, there he used immediately to build either churches or monasteries" (Vita, ch xiii), and when Benedict took possession of the site at Monte Cassino, he began by smashing the sculpture of Apollo and the altar that crowned the height.

The letter from Pope Gregory I to Mellitus copied by Bede says in part:

...that the temples of the idols in that nation ought not to be destroyed; but let the idols that are in them be destroyed; let water be consecrated and sprinkled in the said temples, let altars be erected, and relics placed there. For if those temples are well built, it is requisite that they be converted from the worship of devils to the service of the true God; that the nation, seeing that their temples are not destroyed, may remove error from their hearts, and knowing and adoring the true God, may the more freely resort to the places to which they have been accustomed.

=== Reinterpretation of calendar and feasts ===
In the context of Christianization of Germanic tribes, Herbert Schutz notes that eventually old local gods were still "celebrated on their feast days, on their former sacred sites", replaced with some particular saints.

The letter from Pope Gregory I to Mellitus copied by Bede continues thus:

...And because they are used to slaughter many oxen in sacrifice to devils, some solemnity must be given them in exchange for this, as that on the day of the dedication, or the nativities of the holy martyrs, whose relics are there deposited, they should build themselves huts of the boughs of trees about those churches which have been turned to that use from being temples, and celebrate the solemnity with religious feasting, and no more offer animals to the Devil, but kill cattle and glorify God in their feast, and return thanks to the Giver of all things for their abundance; to the end that, whilst some outward gratifications are retained, they may the more easily consent to the inward joys.

However some scholars question the significance of the reinterpretation of pagan feasts.

=== Reuse of cultural artifacts ===
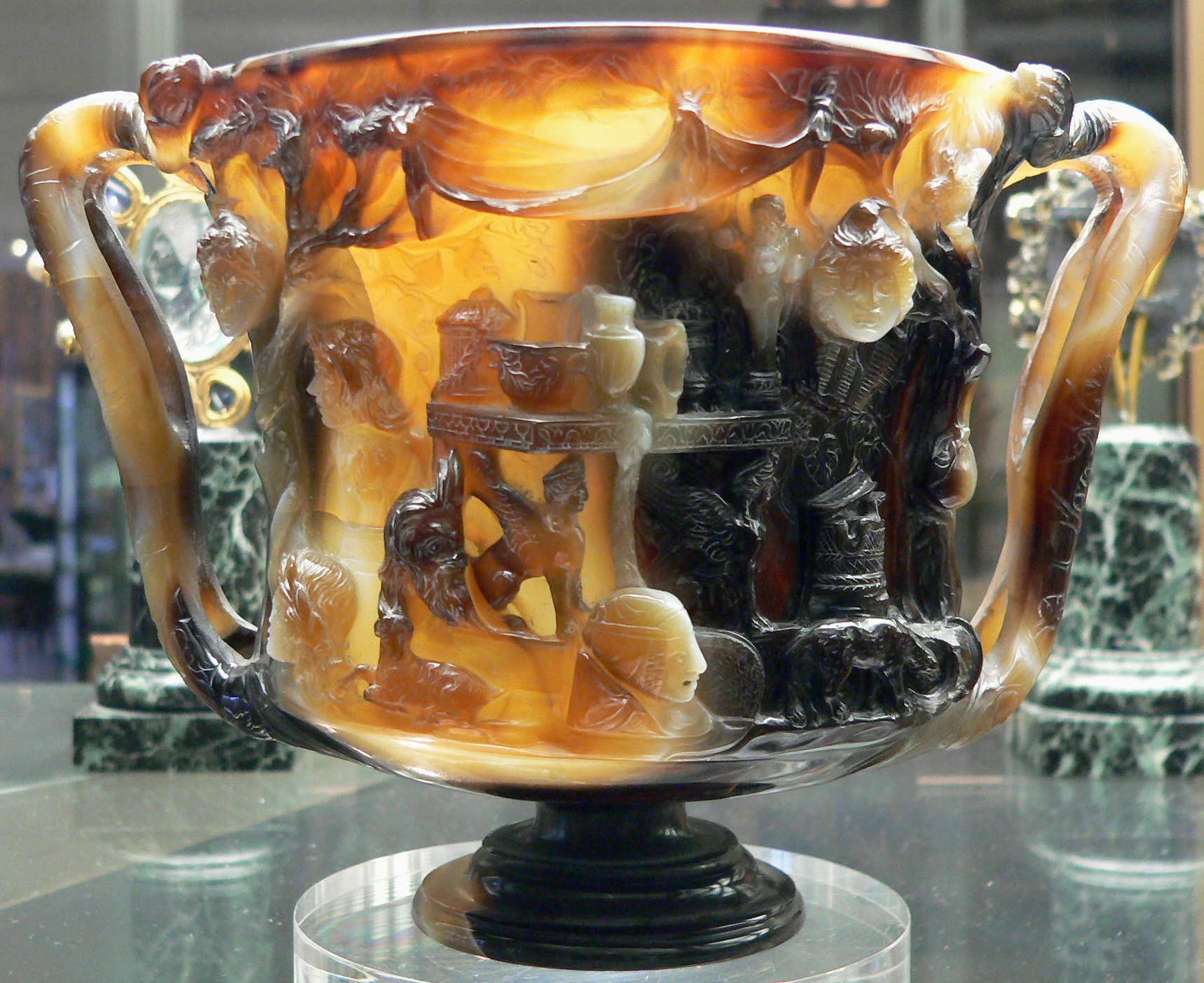
Cup of the Ptolemies; its pagan (Dionysian) motives ignored by the Church

In the context of art, interpretatio christiana amounted to renaming (e.g., by added or changed inscription) or unnaming objects, as well as Christian allegorization of them. For example, a Roman cup or vase would be consecrated and used as a chalice in church. A notable example of the latter is the Cup of the Ptolemies. Unnaming could include deliberate omission of traditional pagan interpretations of the imagery in descriptions of artifacts, leading to their oblivion, whether intentionally or by ignorance.

Crosses were inscribed on old architecture and its reused remnants (spolia). Liz James observes. "Inscribing a cross works similarly [to upsetting pagan statues], sealing the object for Christian purposes".

Martin Henig describes a number of personal intaglio seals with clearly pagan motifs, augmented with Christian inscriptions, such as "IESVS EST AMOR MEVS" ("Iesus est amor meus", "Jesus is my love").

The Protestant Transylvanian Saxons acquired rugs from the Ottoman Empire, sometimes with Islamic motifs, and used them as prestigious decorations for their churches. Only their material value as a good of luxury, and their purely ornamental, non-figural design seems to have made these rugs appear as appropriate adornments of Protestant churches. A report about the great fire which had destroyed the Black Church of Brașov in 1689 mentions the loss of a large rug which "according to legend was woven by St. Paul the Apostle (who was a rug weaver by profession)" It seems likely that the Christian owners of the rugs did not understand the original Islamic context, but created a new legendary context around these objects.

=== Reinterpretation of pre-Christian knowledge and lore ===
Pre-Christian sources and myths were subject to Christian reinterpretation during their transmission or placed in Christian settings. This presents difficulties for historical studies of the periods of conversion. A number of early Christian writers noted similarities between elements of Christianity and some pagan traditions, such as cult of Dionysus or Mithras, however in order to defend Christianity they insisted that these are plots of the devil to corrupt Christianity. Also, when translating pagan notions into a Christian worldview, pagan deities themselves were reinterpreted as demons. An example is the Finnish name of the Devil, Perkele, probably derived from the Proto-Indo-European god of thunder Perkwunos.

Though never a part of the doctrine or theology of any Christian group (and often attracting criticism), some rural Christian communities have continued to sacrifice animals (which are then consumed in a feast) as part of worship, especially at Easter. The animal may be brought into the church before being taken out again and killed. Some villages in Greece sacrifice animals to Orthodox saints in a practice known as kourbania. The name points however to a relation with Islamic qurban. Sacrifice of a lamb, or less commonly a rooster, is a common practice in the Armenian Church, and the Tewahedo Church of Ethiopia and Eritrea. This tradition, called matagh, is believed to stem from pre-Christian pagan rituals. Additionally, some Mayans following a form of Folk Catholicism in Mexico today still sacrifice animals in conjunction with church practices, a ritual practiced in past religions before the arrival of the Spaniards.

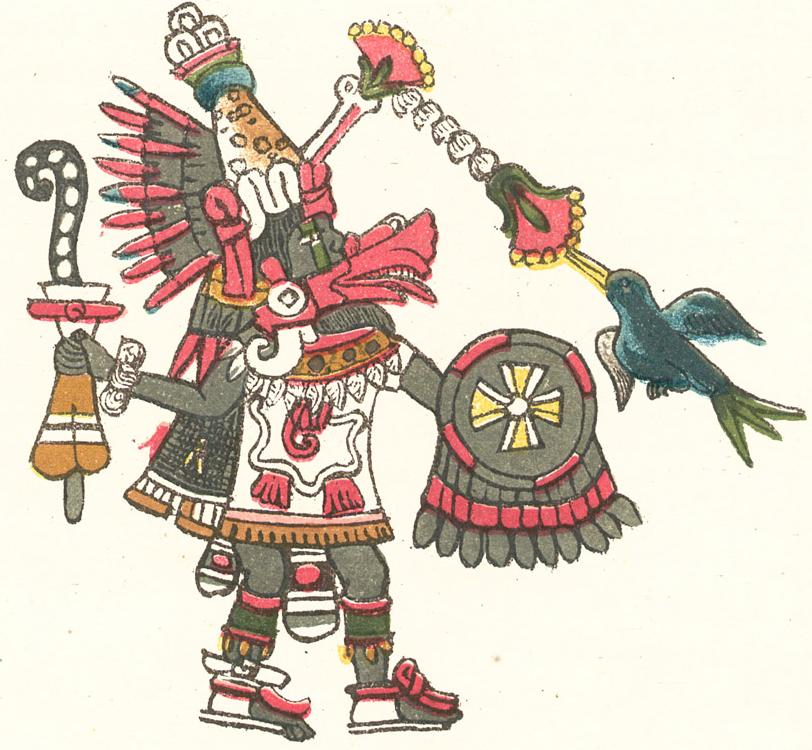
Quetzalcoatl in the Codex Magliabechiano (16th century).

Some missionaries interpreted the Aztec god Quetzalcoatl as an echo of a pre-Columbian Christian missionary. Among the Jesuit missionaries to China, the figurists believed that Confucianism and the I Ching prophetized Christianity.

A thorough analysis of Christian reinterpretation of ancient learning was carried out by Hervé Inglebert, with special attention to cosmography, geography, ethnography, and historiography.

== Scholarship ==
Humanistic studies of Antiquity and the Reformation combined in the 16th century to produce works of scholarship marked by an agenda that was occupied with identifying Roman Catholic practices with paganism, and identifying the emerging Protestant churches with a purgative "re-Christianization" of society. The Lutheran scholar Philip Melanchthon produced his Apologia Confessionis Augustanae (1530) detailing the rites derived from pagan practices. Heinrich Bullinger, De origine erroris libris duo (1539) detailed the pagan "origins of (Catholic) errors".

Isaac Casaubon, De rebus sacris et ecclesiasticus exercitationes (1614) makes a third familiar example, where sound scholarship was somewhat compromised by sectarian pleading. Thus such pagan precedents for Christian practice have tended to be downplayed or even sometimes dismissed by Christian apologists as a form of Protestant Apologetics.

The 20th century saw more purely historical inquiries, free of sectarian bias; an early historicist classic in this field of study was Jean Seznec's The Survival of the Pagan Gods: the mythological tradition and its place in Renaissance humanism and the arts..

== See also ==
- Interpretatio graeca, recasting of myths and traditions of other peoples in terms of the traditions of Ancient Greece, in an attempt to understand them
- Inculturation
- Category:Supernatural beings identified with Christian saints
- Unknown god
