= Ludovico Furconio =

Bishop of Giovinazzo

Most Reverend Ludovico Furconio
- Bishop of Giovinazzo
- Church: Catholic Church
- Diocese: Diocese of Giovinazzo
- In office: 1528–1549
- Predecessor: Marcello Planca
- Successor: Juan Antolínez Brecianos de la Rivera

Ludovico Furconio was a Roman Catholic prelate who served as Bishop of Giovinazzo (1528–1549).

== Biography ==
On 4 December 1528, Ludovico Furconio was appointed by Pope Clement VII as Bishop of Giovinazzo. He served as Bishop of Giovinazzo until his resignation in 1549.

== External links and additional sources ==
- Cheney, David M. "Diocese of Giovinazzo e Terlizzi". Catholic-Hierarchy.org. (for Chronology of Bishops) ^{[self-published]}
- Chow, Gabriel. "Diocese of Giovinazzo (Italy)". GCatholic.org. (for Chronology of Bishops) ^{[self-published]}

Catholic Church titles
Preceded by Marcello Planca	Bishop of Giovinazzo; 1528–1549	Succeeded by Juan Antolínez Brecianos de la Rivera
