= Juan Antolínez Brecianos de la Rivera =

Roman Catholic prelate

Most Reverend Juan Antolínez Brecianos de la Rivera
- Bishop of Giovinazzo
- Church: Catholic Church
- Diocese: Diocese of Giovinazzo
- In office: 1549–1574
- Predecessor: Ludovico Furconio
- Successor: Sebastiano Barnaba

Orders
- Consecration: 1549 by Jean Lunel

Personal details
- Died: 21 September 1581 Giovinazzo, Italy

Juan Antolínez Brecianos de la Rivera was a Roman Catholic prelate who served as Bishop of Giovinazzo (1549–1574).

== Biography ==
On 25 October 1549, Juan Antolínez Brecianos de la Rivera was appointed by Pope Paul III as Bishop of Giovinazzo. In 1549, he was consecrated bishop by Jean Lunel, Auxiliary Bishop of Bayeux. He served as Bishop of Giovinazzo until his resignation in 1574. He died on 21 September 1581.

== External links and additional sources ==
- Cheney, David M. "Diocese of Giovinazzo e Terlizzi". Catholic-Hierarchy.org. (for Chronology of Bishops) ^{[self-published]}
- Chow, Gabriel. "Diocese of Giovinazzo (Italy)". GCatholic.org. (for Chronology of Bishops) ^{[self-published]}

Catholic Church titles
Preceded by Ludovico Furconio	Bishop of Giovinazzo; 1549–1574	Succeeded by Sebastiano Barnaba
