= Grimaldo Turculis =

Most Reverend Grimaldo Turculis
- Bishop of Giovinazzo
- Church: Catholic Church
- Diocese: Diocese of Giovinazzo
- In office: 1395–1399?

Grimaldo Turculis was a Roman Catholic prelate who served as Bishop of Giovinazzo (1395–1399?).

== Biography ==
On 14 October 1395, he was appointed during the papacy of Pope Boniface IX as Bishop of Giovinazzo. It uncertain how long he served as Bishop of Giovinazzo; the next bishop of record is Sixtus Coleta who was appointed in 1399. While bishop, he was the principal co-consecrator of Angelo Marcuzzi, Bishop of Telese (1413)

== External links and additional sources ==
- Cheney, David M. "Diocese of Giovinazzo e Terlizzi". Catholic-Hierarchy.org. (for Chronology of Bishops) ^{[self-published]}
- Chow, Gabriel. "Diocese of Giovinazzo (Italy)". GCatholic.org. (for Chronology of Bishops) ^{[self-published]}

Catholic Church titles
Preceded by	Bishop of Giovinazzo; 1395–1399?	Succeeded by
