= Enzo Camporeale =

Italian composer

Enzo (Vincenzo) Camporeale (born 27 July 1966) is an Italian pianist, composer, and vocalist.

== Life and career ==
Camporeale was born in Giovinazzo, a small town in the Province of Bari. According to his biographies at the Scuola Wilson and BDR dance schools, at the age of six he sang in the 1972 regional finals of the Zecchino d'Oro competition and in 1977 won a regional radio competition as a pianist performing "Honky Tonk Train Blues" by Meade Lux Lewis. After completing a diploma in piano in 1990 he worked as an accompanist for the Compagnia Italiana di Operette and the Teatro Petruzzelli. In 1998 he completed further studies in piano, band instrumentation, composition and conducting at the Conservatorio Tito Schipa in Lecce.

Camporeale has since appeared as a recital accompanist, as well as serving an accompanist at several music and dance schools, including the Accademia nazionale di danza (Italian National Academy of Dance). His compositions include anthems for Giovinazzo's five-a-side football and hockey teams and the song "Aspettando il blu" inspired by the letters of Raffaele Sollecito, which Camporeale performed on the television show Porta a Porta in December 2009.
