= De Optimo Genere Oratorum =

De Optimo Genere Oratorum, "On the Best Kind of Orators", is a work from Marcus Tullius Cicero written in 46 BCE between two of his other works, Brutus and the Orator ad M. Brutum. Cicero attempts to explain why his view of oratorical style reflects true Atticism and is better than that of the Roman Atticists "who would confine the orator to the simplicity and artlessness of the early Attic orators."

This short treatise professes to be the introduction to a translation of a speech by Demosthenes called On the Crown, and a speech of his rival, Aeschines, called Against Ctesiphon. Cicero was an advocate of free translation: "The essence of successful oratory, he insists, is that it should 'instruct, delight, and move the minds of his audience', this being achievable in translation only by conserving the 'force and flavour of the passage', not by translating 'word for word'." The actual translation of the two speeches was never published, and De Optimo Genere Oratorum was not published in Cicero's lifetime.

Many believe that the final treatise is a compilation of two drafts that Cicero wrote. In his critique of this piece, Hendrickson argues how the "brevity of mere jottings and suggestions, to omissions of words (which modern editors have supplied), to suppressed sequences of thought, to evidence of double treatment" all give evidence of the uncompleted state of De Optimo Genere Oratorum.

== Dispute over placement of the text ==
Brutus is a work by Cicero that explains the history of Roman oratory, and Orator highlights the basic requirements needed to be the best orator. This is important because it helps scholars best estimate when De Optimo Genere Oratorum was written in accordance with these two texts. Writing De Optimo Genere Oratorum after Brutus allowed Cicero to use the historical information from Brutus to support his own views on stylistic propriety. The Orator then takes the views of De Optimo Genere Oratorum, and develops them into a more conclusive statement of the perfect orator.

== Summary of the seven parts of De Optimo Genere Oratorum ==
=== Part 1 ===
Cicero starts off talking about different kinds of poets and how every genre of poetry has its own individuality. He then contrasts this to describing different kinds of orators, whom you can distinguish from one another, but ultimately still miss information about the art of oratory. "There is only one kind of orator...the one whose speech instructs, delights, and moves the minds of his audience.” Although there are other great orators, the difference is "in degree, not in kind.”

=== Part 2 ===
Cicero says that the orator must attend to style, structure, arrangement, memory, and delivery. Using these criteria he develops a way of judging the best orator.

=== Part 3 ===
Cicero feels that the Attic writers of Athens exemplified such criteria and strove to be better than the best in their oratory. He argues that these are the ones that need to be followed, unlike those practitioners of the Asiatic style “whose opulent style is full of faults; Asia produced this latter sort in abundance.”

=== Part 4 ===
Cicero uses the example of Lysias, who was able to abstract his style from his writing and write in the tone of someone else. He then makes a distinction between and addresses two groups, those who think they speak in an Attic manner and those who say no Roman does. To Cicero, the best orators were those who lived in Athens, Demosthenes being the best, so “speaking in the Attic fashion means speaking well.”

=== Part 5 ===
To prove his point he explains that he has translated a debate between the two best Attic orators, Aeschines and Demosthenes.

=== Part 6 ===
He argues that in presenting this translation of a debate, the characteristics of the best orator will be made evident. He also criticizes any objections to his Latin translation of the text.

=== Part 7 ===
He then presents the case that Aeschines and Demosthenes were debating over. In Athens there were laws against crowning certain citizens and another against when and where to reward someone. In a charitable fashion, Demosthenes repaired the city walls and caught the attention Ctesiphon who wanted him crowned, although this was contrary to the law. Aeschines then brought charges against Ctesiphon stating the laws that had not been followed and questioning the genuine and kind nature of Demosthenes's actions. Aeschines himself, however, was using this instance to truly attack Ctesiphon.

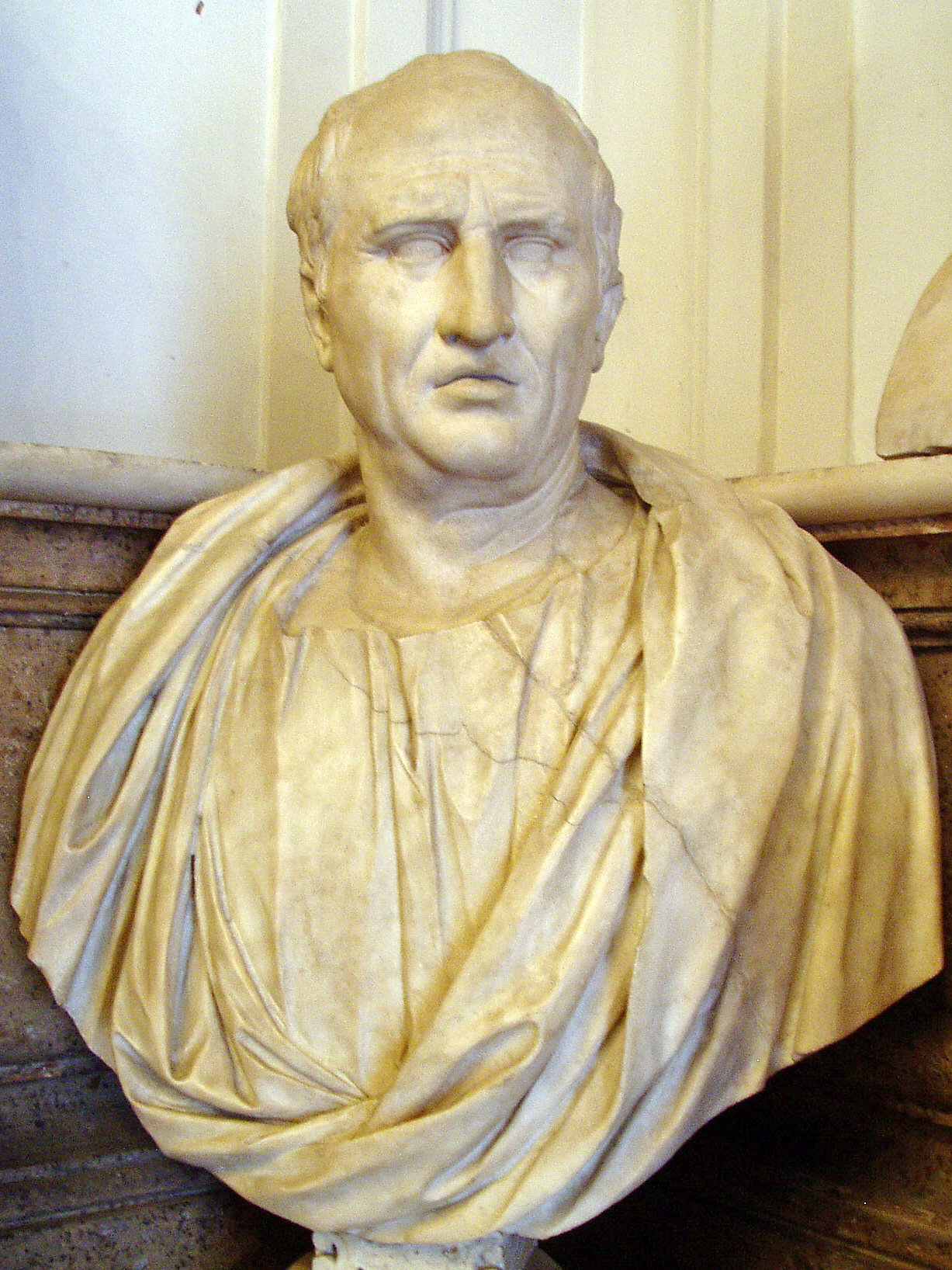
cicero the great philosopher

The charges were brought up during the reign of Philip of Macedon but were not addressed until that of Alexander. All came to hear the two great orators, and Cicero finishes the introduction by stating his sincere intention to reflect the true spirit of the debate.
