= Roman Catholic Diocese of Giovinazzo e Terlizzi =

Catholic church in Italy from 1100 to 1836, later was merged with anothers

The Diocese of Giovinazzo e Terlizzi (Latin: Dioecesis Iuvenacensis et Terlitiensis) was a Roman Catholic diocese in Italy, located in the city of Giovinazzo, in the Metropolitan City of Bari, Apulia. In 1836, it was suppressed to the Diocese of Molfetta–Giovinazzo–Terlizzi.

== History ==
- 1100: Established as Diocese of Giovinazzo
- 1749.11.26: United with the Diocese of Terlizzi to form the Diocese of Giovinazzo e Terlizzi

=== After Napoleon ===
Following the extinction of the Napoleonic Kingdom of Italy, the Congress of Vienna authorized the restoration of the Papal States and the Kingdom of Naples. Since the French occupation had seen the abolition of many Church institutions in the Kingdom, as well as the confiscation of most Church property and resources, it was imperative that Pope Pius VII and King Ferdinand IV reach agreement on restoration and restitution.

A concordat was finally signed on 16 February 1818, and ratified by Pius VII on 25 February 1818. Ferdinand issued the concordat as a law on 21 March 1818. The right of the king to nominate the candidate for a vacant bishopric was recognized, as in the Concordat of 1741, subject to papal confirmation (preconisation). On 27 June 1818, Pius VII issued the bull De Ulteriore, in which, among many other things, he dealt with dioceses which had been directly subject to the Holy See. The decision was made to suppress permanently the united dioceses of Giovenazzo and Terlizzi, once the current incumbent had vacated the seats, and to incorporate the two dioceses into the diocese of Molfetta.

On 4 March 1836, Pope Gregory XVI, in the bull "Aeterni Patris", united the dioceses of Giovenazzo and Terlizzi with the diocese of Molfetta. It was determined that there would be only one priestly seminary for the three dioceses, in Molfetta. Molfetta remained directly subject to the Holy See.

=== Diocesan Reorganization ===
Following the Second Vatican Council, and in accordance with the norms laid out in the council's decree, Christus Dominus chapter 40, Pope Paul VI ordered a reorganization of the ecclesiastical provinces in southern Italy. He ordered consultations among the members of the Congregation of Bishops in the Vatican Curia, the Italian Bishops Conference, and the various dioceses concerned.

On 18 February 1984, the Vatican and the Italian State signed a new and revised concordat. Based on the revisions, a set of Normae was issued on 15 November 1984, which was accompanied in the next year, on 3 June 1985, by enabling legislation. According to the agreement, the practice of having one bishop govern two separate dioceses at the same time, aeque personaliter, was abolished. The Vatican continued consultations which had begun under Pope John XXIII for the merging of small dioceses, especially those with personnel and financial problems, into one combined diocese.

On 30 September 1986, Pope John Paul II ordered that the dioceses of Molfetta, Giovenazza, Terlizzi and Ruvo be merged into one diocese with one bishop, with the Latin title Dioecesis Melphictensis-Rubensis-Iuvenacensis-Terlitiensis. The seat of the diocese was to be in Molfetta, whose cathedral was to serve as the cathedral of the merged diocese. The cathedrals in Giovenazza, Terlizzi, and Ruvo were to have the honorary titles of "co-cathedral"; the Chapters were each to be a Capitulum Concathedralis. There was to be only one diocesan Tribunal, in Molfetta, and likewise one seminary, one College of Consultors, and one Priests' Council. The territory of the new diocese was to include the territory of the suppressed dioceses. The new diocese was a suffragan of the archdiocese of Bari-Bitonto.

== Bishops of Giovinazzo ==
Latin Name: Iuvenacensis
Erected: 11th Century

- Grimaldo Turculis (14 Oct 1395 – 1399?)

...

- Lorenzo Pucci (1 Apr 1517 – Aug 1517 Resigned)
- Marcello Planca (21 Aug 1517 – 1528 Died)
- Ludovico Furconio (4 Dec 1528 – 1549 Resigned)
- Juan Antolínez Brecianos de la Rivera (25 Oct 1549 – 1574 Resigned)
- Sebastiano Barnaba (25 Jun 1574 – 17 Aug 1579 Appointed, Bishop of Potenza)
- Luciano Rosso (de Rubeis) (20 Oct 1581 – 23 Jan 1589 Appointed, Bishop of Mazara del Vallo)
- Giovanni Antonio Viperani (17 May 1589 – Mar 1610 Died)
- Gregorio Santacroce, O.S.B. (Mar 1610 – 1611 Died)
- Giulio Masi (18 May 1611 – 18 Jul 1627 Appointed, Bishop of Monopoli)
- Carlo Maranta (7 Sep 1637 – 24 Sep 1657 Confirmed, Bishop of Tropea)
- Michelangelo Vaginari, O.F.M. (Michael Angelus a Neapoli)(9 Jun 1659 – 1667 Died)
- Agnelo Alfieri, O.F.M. (18 Mar 1671 – Aug 1692 Died)
- Giacinto Gaetano Chiurlia (Chyurlia), O.P. (24 Aug 1693 – 23 Mar 1730 Died)).
- Paolo de Mercurio (18 Jun 1731 – 2 Feb 1752 Died)

== Bishops of Giovinazzo e Terlizzi ==
United: 26 November 1749 with the Diocese of Terlizzi

- Giuseppe Orlandi, O.S.B. (24 Apr 1752 - 15 Apr 1776 Died)
- Michele Continisi (16 Dec 1776 - May 1810 Died)
- Domenico Antonio Cimaglia (25 May 1818 - 2 Oct 1818 Confirmed, Bishop of Molfetta)

== See also ==
- Catholic Church in Italy

== Bibliography ==
- Bianco, Rosanna (2007). "La cattedrale di Giovinazzo," (in Italian), in: A.C. Quintavalle (ed.), Medioevo: l’Europa delle cattedrali, Atti del Convegno Internazionale di Studio (Parma, 19-23 settembre 2006) Milano 2007, pp. 328–336.
- Roscini, F. (1964). Storia della sede vescovile di Giovinazzo. (in Italian). Giovinazzo 1964.
- Rucci, V. (1983). La Cattedrale di Giovinazzo a sette secoli dalla sua consacrazione. (in Italian). Giovinazzo 1983.
- Valente, G. (1988). Le questioni giurisdizionali tra gli arcipreti di Terlizzi e i vescovi di Giovinazzo. Documenti inediti (secc. XI-XV). (in Italian). Bari 1988.
