= Giovinazzo =

- Comune
- Comune di Giovinazzo
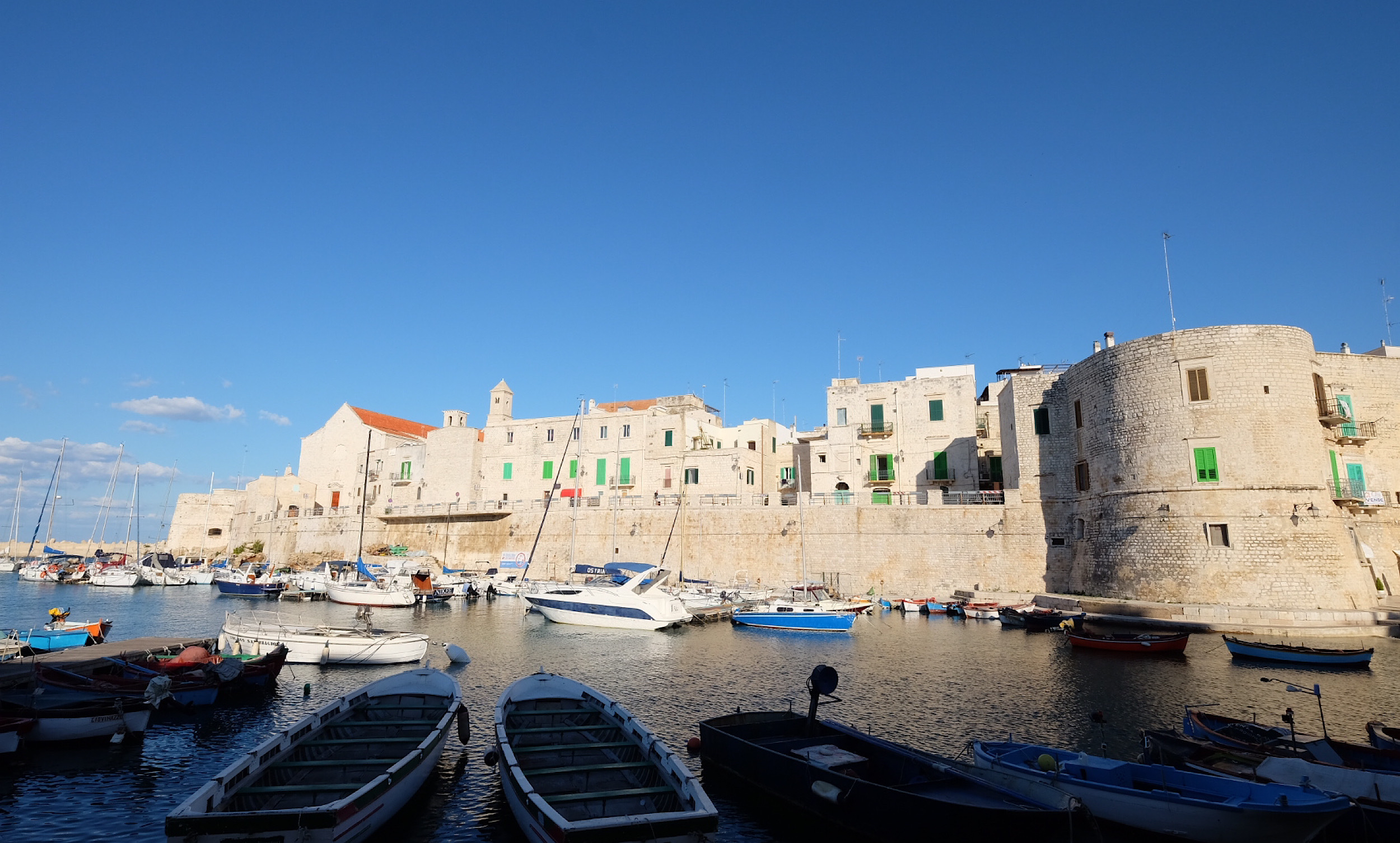
- View of Giovinazzo from the sea

- Coat of arms

- Location within Italy Location within Apulia
- Coordinates: 41°11′N 16°40′E
- Country: Italy
- Region: Apulia
- Metropolitan city: Bari (BA)

Government
  - Mayor: Michele Sollecito

Area
  - Total: 44.3 km^{2} (17.1 sq mi)
- Elevation: 18 m (59 ft)

Population (31 December 2020)
  - Total: 19.537
  - Density: 0.441/km^{2} (1.14/sq mi)
- Demonym: Giovinazzesi
- Time zone: UTC+1 (CET)
  - Summer (DST): UTC+2 (CEST)
- Postal code: 70054
- Dialing code: 080
- Patron saint: St. Thomas
- Saint day: July 3 Madonna di Corsignano
- Website: Official website

Giovinazzo (Barese: Scevenàzze) is a town, comune (municipality) and former bishopric within the Metropolitan City of Bari, Apulia region, southeastern Italy.

== History ==
It was a small fortified centre of the Romans, who called it Natolium, possibly built on the ruins of the Peucete Netium which was destroyed during the Punic Wars.

After the Byzantine period, it became a countship (later a duchy). It later became a flourishing commercial centre, that had trading connections with Venice.

== Main sights ==
- The co-cathedral, dedicated to Santa Maria Assunta (Mary's Assumption), built in the Norman period (1150–1180), in characteristic Apulian Romanesque style featuring Eastern and Western elements, consecrated in 1283 under bishop Giovanni II; under bishop Paolo De Mercurio (1731–1752) it got a thorough Baroque remodeling.
- Ducal Palace/Castle (the 17th century)
- Two columns of the Via Traiana, which however did not pass through the city.

== People ==
- American actor John Turturro's father, Nicholas Turturro, emigrated to the United States from Giovinazzo in the first half of the 20th century.
- Enzo Camporeale, pianist and composer

== See also ==
- List of Catholic dioceses in Italy
- Giovinazzo railway station
