= Vincenzo Cavalli =

17th-century Catholic bishop

Most Reverend Vincenzo Cavalli
- Bishop of Bertinoro
- Church: Catholic Church
- Diocese: Diocese of Bertinoro
- In office: 1676–1701
- Predecessor: Guido Bentivoglio (bishop)
- Successor: Giovanni Battista Missiroli

Orders
- Consecration: 19 April 1676 by Gasparo Carpegna

Personal details
- Born: 25 March 1647 Ravenna, Papal States
- Died: June 1701 (age 54) Bertinoro, Papal States

Vincenzo Cavalli or Vincenzo Gaballi (25 March 1647 – June 1701) was a Roman Catholic prelate who was Bishop of Bertinoro from 1676 to 1701.

== Biography ==
Vincenzo Cavalli was born in Ravenna, Italy on 25 March 1647. On 23 March 1676, he was appointed during the papacy of Pope Clement X as Bishop of Bertinoro. On 19 April 1676, he was consecrated bishop by Gasparo Carpegna, Cardinal-Priest of San Silvestro in Capite, with Prospero Bottini, Titular Archbishop of Myra, and Giacomo Buoni, Bishop of Montefeltro, serving as co-consecrators. He served as Bishop of Bertinoro until his death in June 1701.

== External links and additional sources ==
- Cheney, David M. "Diocese of Bertinoro". Catholic-Hierarchy.org. (for Chronology of Bishops)
- Chow, Gabriel. "Diocese of Bertinoro (Italy)". GCatholic.org. (for Chronology of Bishops)

Catholic Church titles
Preceded by Guido Bentivoglio (bishop)	Bishop of Bertinoro; 1676–1701	Succeeded by Giovanni Battista Missiroli
