= Gian Antonio Fassano =

Most Reverend Gian Antonio Fassano
- Auxiliary Bishop of Monreale; Titular Bishop of Christopolis
- Church: Catholic Church
- Archdiocese: Archdiocese of Monreale
- In office: 1544–1568

Orders
- Consecration: 30 Jun 1544 by Alfonso Oliva

Personal details
- Died: 10 September 1568 Monreale, Italy

Gian Antonio Fassano (also Gian Antonio Phassarus or Gian Antonio Fasside) (died 10 Sep 1568) was a Roman Catholic prelate who served as Auxiliary Bishop of Monreale (1544–1568) and Titular Bishop of Christopolis (1544–1568).

== Biography ==
On 4 Jun 1544, Gian Antonio Fassano was appointed during the papacy of Pope Paul III as Auxiliary Bishop of Monreale and Titular Bishop of Christopolis On 30 Jun 1544, he was consecrated bishop by Alfonso Oliva, Archbishop of Amalfi, with Scipione Rebiba, Titular Bishop of Amyclae, and Cornelio Musso, Bishop of Bertinoro, serving as co-consecrators. He served as Auxiliary Bishop of Monreale until his death on 10 Sep 1568.

While bishop, he was the principal consecrator of Antonino Faraone, Bishop of Cefalù (1562), and Juan Orozco de Arce, Bishop of Siracusa (1562).

Catholic Church titles
Preceded by	Titular Bishop of Christopolis; 1544–1568	Succeeded by
