= Giuseppe Ciantes =

Roman Catholic prelate, hebraist and theologian

Most Reverend Giuseppe Ciantes
- Bishop of Marsico Nuovo
- Church: Catholic Church
- Diocese: Diocese of Marsico Nuovo
- In office: 1640–1656
- Predecessor: Timoteo Castelli
- Successor: Angelo Pineri

Orders
- Consecration: 19 March 1640 by Marcantonio Franciotti

Personal details
- Born: 1602 Rome, Italy
- Died: 24 February 1670 (age 68) Marsico Nuovo, Italy

Giuseppe Ciantes, O.P. (1602–1670) was a Roman Catholic prelate, hebraist and theologian who served as Bishop of Marsico Nuovo (1640–1656).

== Biography ==
Giuseppe Ciantes was born in Rome, Italy in 1602 and ordained a priest in the Order of Preachers. He completed his studies at the Roman studium of the Dominican Order at Santa Maria sopra Minerva, which later developed into the Pontifical University of Saint Thomas Aquinas, and was professor of theology and philosophy there before 1640. He devoted himself to the study of Oriental languages, and had the opportunity of applying his knowledge of Hebrew for the conversion of the Jews, to whom Urban VIII had appointed him preacher in Rome. On 5 March 1640, he was appointed Bishop of Marsico Nuovo in the Kingdom of Naples. On 19 March 1640, he was consecrated bishop by Marcantonio Franciotti, Bishop of Lucca, with Lelio Falconieri, Titular Archbishop of Thebae, and Giovanni Battista Altieri (seniore), Bishop Emeritus of Camerino, serving as co-consecrators. He distinguished himself by the good example which he set in his diocese. In January 1656 he resigned the episcopal functions to retire to the convent of Minerva. In 1657 Ciantes published a "monumental bilingual edition of the first three Parts of Thomas Aquinas' Summa contra Gentiles, which includes the original Latin text and a Hebrew translation prepared by Ciantes, assisted by Jewish apostates, the Summa divi Thomae Aquinatis ordinis praedicatorum Contra Gentiles quam Hebraice eloquitur…. Until the present this remains the only significant translation of a major Latin scholastic work in modern Hebrew." He died in the convent of Minerva on 24 February 1670.

== Works ==
- Ciantes, Giuseppe (1667). De sanctissima trinitate ex antiquorum Hebraeorum testimonijs euidenter comprobata (in Latin). Romae – via typis Varesij.
- Ciantes, Giuseppe (1668). Della incarnazione del verbo divino evidentemente difesa dalle opposizioni degli Ebrei colle dottrine medesime de loro maggiori Teologi (in Italian). Roma – via per Nicol'Angelo Tinassi.
- Ciantes, Giuseppe (1669). Della perfezione dovuta allo stato del Vescovo (in Italian). Roma – via Tinassi.
- Ciantes, Giuseppe (1657). Summa diui Thomae Aquinatis ordinis Praedicatorum contra Gentiles. Quam Hebraicè eloquitur Iosephus Ciantes Romanus episcopus Marsicensis ex eodem Ordine assumptus (in Latin). Romae – via ex typographia Iacobi Phaei Andreae filij.

== Episcopal succession ==
While bishop, he was the principal co-consecrator of:

- Paolo Ciera, Bishop of Vieste (1642);
- Marco Antonio Gussio, Bishop of Cefalù (1644);
- Ignazio Ciantes, Bishop of Sant'Angelo dei Lombardi e Bisaccia (1647);
- Giacinto Cevoli, Bishop of San Marco (1648);
- Domenico Campanella, Bishop of Sant'Agata de' Goti (1654);
- Benedicto Sánchez de Herrera, Bishop of Monopoli (1654);
- Luis Alfonso de Los Cameros, Bishop of Patti (1654);
- Matteo di Génnaro, Archbishop of Reggio Calabria (1660);
- Francesco Falabella, Archbishop of Santa Severina (1660);
- Francesco Angelucci, Bishop of Veroli (1660);
- Luigi de Gennaro, Bishop of Cava (1660);
- Anastazy Rudzicki, Bishop of Bacău (1662);
- Matteo Cosentino, Bishop of Anglona-Tursi (1667); and
- Alessandro Diotallevi, Bishop of Pesaro (1667).

== External links and additional sources ==
- Cheney, David M. "Diocese of Marsico Nuovo". Catholic-Hierarchy.org. (for Chronology of Bishops) (for Chronology of Bishops) ^{[self-published]}
- Chow, Gabriel. "Diocese of Marsico Nuovo". GCatholic.org. (for Chronology of Bishops) (for Chronology of Bishops) ^{[self-published]}

Catholic Church titles
Preceded by Timoteo Castelli	Bishop of Marsico Nuovo; 1640–1656	Succeeded by Angelo Pineri
