= Carlo Ghidelli =

Italian Roman Catholic prelate and biblical scholar (born 1934)

The Most Reverend Carlo Ghidelli
- Archbishop Emeritus of Lanciano-Ortona
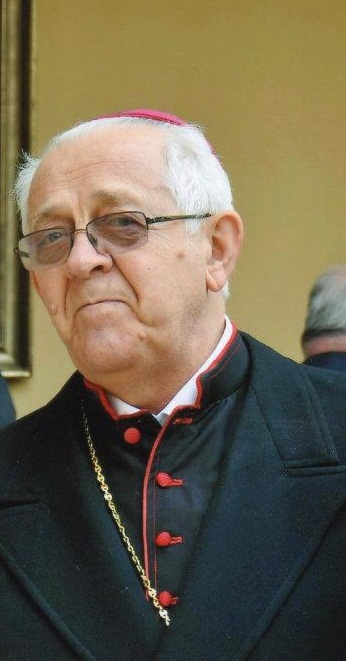
- Church: Catholic Church
- Archdiocese: Lanciano-Ortona
- Appointed: 25 November 2000
- Installed: 14 January 2001
- Retired: 11 October 2010
- Predecessor: Enzio d'Antonio
- Successor: Emidio Cipollone

Orders
- Ordination: 28 June 1958 by Placido Maria Cambiaghi
- Consecration: 14 January 2001 by Giovanni Battista Re

Personal details
- Born: 24 April 1934 (age 92) Offanengo, Kingdom of Italy
- Education: Pontifical Gregorian University, Pontifical Biblical Institute
- Motto: Vobiscum sum
- Coat of arms: Carlo Ghidelli's coat of arms

Carlo Ghidelli (born 24 April 1934) is an Italian Roman Catholic prelate and biblical scholar who served as the Archbishop of Lanciano-Ortona from 2000 to 2010. He was previously a professor of biblical studies, an official of the Italian Episcopal Conference (CEI), and the ecclesiastical assistant of the Catholic University of the Sacred Heart. He became archbishop emeritus on 11 October 2010.

== Biography ==
=== Early life and education ===
Ghidelli was born on 24 April 1934 in Offanengo, in the province of Cremona, Italy, within the Diocese of Crema. He studied theology at the Pontifical Gregorian University, where he obtained a degree in theology, and biblical studies at the Pontifical Biblical Institute, where he obtained a licentiate in Sacred Scripture.

He was ordained a priest for the Diocese of Crema on 28 June 1958.

=== Ecclesiastical career ===
Following his ordination, Ghidelli worked as a lecturer at the diocesan seminary and at the interregional theological faculty in Milan. He also served as secretary to the Bishop of Crema, Carlo Manziana, as an assistant to the Italian Catholic university student federation (FUCI) and the Movement of Italian Catholic Graduates (MEIC), and as a religious education teacher at a classical secondary school. He also served as a chaplain in parishes in the Crema area.

In January 1983, the Permanent Episcopal Council of the Italian Episcopal Conference appointed him undersecretary of the conference for the 1983–1986 triennium.

In 1986, he became the central ecclesiastical assistant of the Catholic University of the Sacred Heart. He also served as a consultor to the Pontifical Council for Promoting Christian Unity.

=== Archbishop of Lanciano-Ortona ===
On 25 November 2000, Pope John Paul II appointed Ghidelli Archbishop of Lanciano-Ortona, succeeding Enzio d'Antonio. At the time of his appointment, he was serving as central ecclesiastical assistant of the Catholic University of the Sacred Heart.

He received episcopal consecration on 14 January 2001 by Archbishop Giovanni Battista Re.

During his episcopate, Ghidelli promoted the religious and Eucharistic traditions of the archdiocese. On 4 October 2004, Pope John Paul II addressed a letter to him concerning the centenary of the dedication of the restored Basilica-Cathedral of Madonna del Ponte in Lanciano, commemorating the period 1905–2005. Ghidelli had proposed the celebration of a special Marian Eucharistic Year in connection with the anniversary and the wider Year of the Eucharist.

=== Retirement ===
On 11 October 2010, Pope Benedict XVI accepted Ghidelli's resignation from the pastoral governance of the Archdiocese of Lanciano-Ortona, in accordance with canon 401 §1 of the Code of Canon Law. He was succeeded by Emidio Cipollone and became archbishop emeritus.

== Biblical scholarship and publications ==
In addition to his ecclesiastical responsibilities, Ghidelli has worked extensively in biblical studies. His academic interests include Sacred Scripture and the New Testament. He has authored numerous articles and publications on biblical subjects.

His publications have included works issued by the Italian Catholic publishing house Vita e Pensiero.

In 2022, his book Ecco tua madre! L'icona della madre nella Bibbia (Behold Your Mother! The Image of the Mother in the Bible) was presented in connection with the religious and cultural activities in the Crema area. The book examines the theme of motherhood through biblical passages from the Old and New Testaments.
