= Enzio d'Antonio =

Italian priest (1925–2019)

- Archbishop of Lanciano-Ortona
- Church: Catholic Church
- Archdiocese: Archdiocese of Lanciano-Ortona
- In office: 13 May 1982 – 25 November 2000
- Predecessor: Leopoldo Teofili
- Successor: Carlo Ghidelli
- Previous posts: Titular Archbishop of Velebusdus (1979-1982); Archbishop of Boiano-Campobasso (1977-1979) (Arch)Bishop of Trivento (1975-1977); Coadjutor Archbishop of Boiano-Campobasso (1975-1977)

Orders
- Ordination: 29 June 1949
- Consecration: 11 May 1975 by Antonio Poma

Personal details
- Born: 16 May 1925 Lanciano, Province of Chieti, Kingdom of Italy
- Died: 17 December 2019 (aged 94) Lanciano, Province of Chieti, Italy

Enzio d'Antonio (16 May 1925 – 17 December 2019) was an Italian Roman Catholic bishop.

D'Antonio was born in Italy and was ordained to the priesthood in 1949. He served as archbishop of the Roman Catholic Archdiocese of Campobasso-Boiano, Italy, from 1977 to 1979 and as archbishop of the Roman Catholic Archdiocese of Lanciano-Ortona, Italy, from 1982 to 2000.
