= Guido Bentivoglio (bishop) =

Italian bishop

Most Reverend Guido Bentivoglio
- Bishop Emeritus of Bertinoro
- Church: Catholic Church
- Diocese: Diocese of Bertinoro
- In office: 1660–1676
- Predecessor: Ottaviano Prati
- Successor: Vincenzo Cavalli

Orders
- Consecration: 23 Feb 1660 by Carlo Pio di Savoia

Personal details
- Died: 1 February 1680

Bishop Guido Bentivoglio, C.R. (died 1680) was a Roman Catholic prelate who served as Bishop of Bertinoro (1660–1676).

== Biography ==
Guido Bentivoglio was ordained a priest in the Congregation of Clerics Regular of the Divine Providence. On 16 Feb 1660, he was appointed during the papacy of Pope Alexander VII as Bishop of Bertinoro. On 23 Feb 1660, he was consecrated bishop by Carlo Pio di Savoia, Cardinal-Deacon of Santa Maria in Domnica, with Giuseppe Sanfelice, Archbishop of Cosenza, and Carlo Stefano Anastasio Ciceri, Bishop of Alessandria della Paglia, serving as co-consecrators. He served as Bishop of Bertinoro until his resignation on 1 Feb 1676. He died on 1 Feb 1680.

== Episcopal succession ==
While bishop, he was the principal co-consecrator of:

- Bonifazio Albani, Archbishop of Split (1668);
- Rodolpho Acquaviva, Titular Bishop of Laodicea in Phrygia and Apostolic Nuncio to Switzerland (1668);
- Gianfrancesco Riccamonti, Bishop of Cervia (1668);
- Teodoro Gennaro, Bishop of Krk (1668); and
- Nicola Lepori, Bishop of Saluzzo (1668).

== External links and additional sources ==
- Cheney, David M. "Diocese of Bertinoro". Catholic-Hierarchy.org. (for Chronology of Bishops) ^{[self-published]}
- Chow, Gabriel. "Diocese of Bertinoro (Italy)". GCatholic.org. (for Chronology of Bishops) ^{[self-published]}

Catholic Church titles
Preceded by Ottaviano Prati	Bishop of Bertinoro; 1660–1676	Succeeded by Vincenzo Cavalli
