= Mario Bolognini =

Most Reverend Mario Bolognini
- Church: Catholic Church
- Archdiocese: Roman Catholic Archdiocese of Salerno
- In office: 1591–1605
- Predecessor: Marco Antonio Marsilio
- Successor: Juan Beltrán Guevara y Figueroa
- Previous posts: Archbishop of Lanciano (1579–1588); Archbishop (Personal Title) of Crotone (1588–1591)

Orders
- Ordination: —
- Consecration: 5 July 1579 by Giulio Antonio Santorio

Personal details
- Died: 25 February 1605 Salerno, Italy

Mario Bolognini (died 25 February 1605) was a Roman Catholic prelate who served as Archbishop of Salerno (1591–1605), Archbishop (Personal Title) of Crotone (1588–1591), and Archbishop of Lanciano (1579–1588).

== Biography ==
On 3 July 1579, Mario Bolognini was appointed during the papacy of Pope Gregory XIII as Archbishop of Lanciano. On 5 July 1579, he was consecrated bishop by Giulio Antonio Santorio, Cardinal-Priest of San Bartolomeo all'Isola, with Fabio Mirto Frangipani, Titular Archbishop of Nazareth, and Gaspare Viviani, Bishop of Hierapetra et Sitia, serving as co-consecrators. On 3 October 1588, he was appointed during the papacy of Pope Sixtus V as Archbishop (Personal Title) of Crotone. On 7 January 1591, he was appointed during the papacy of Pope Gregory XIV as Archbishop of Salerno. He served as Archbishop of Salerno until his death on 25 February 1605.

While bishop, he was the principal co-consecrator of Alessandro Guidiccioni (iuniore), Bishop of Lucca (1600).

== See also ==
- Catholic Church in Italy

== External links and additional sources ==
- Cheney, David M. "Archdiocese of Lanciano-Ortona". Catholic-Hierarchy.org. (for Chronology of Bishops) ^{[self-published]}
- Chow, Gabriel. "Archdiocese of Lanciano-Ortona (Italy)". GCatholic.org. (for Chronology of Bishops) ^{[self-published]}
- Cheney, David M. "Archdiocese of Crotone-Santa Severina". Catholic-Hierarchy.org. (for Chronology of Bishops) ^{[self-published]}
- Chow, Gabriel. "Archdiocese of Crotone-Santa Severina". GCatholic.org. (for Chronology of Bishops) ^{[self-published]}
- Cheney, David M. "Archdiocese of Salerno-Campagna-Acerno". Catholic-Hierarchy.org. (for Chronology of Bishops) ^{[self-published]}
- Chow, Gabriel. "Metropolitan Archdiocese of Salerno–Campagna–Acerno (Italy)". GCatholic.org. (for Chronology of Bishops) ^{[self-published]}

Catholic Church titles
Preceded by Antonio Gaspar Rodríguez	Archbishop of Lanciano; 1579–1588	Succeeded by Paolo Tasso
Preceded by Giuseppe Faraoni	Archbishop (Personal Title) of Crotone; 1588–1591	Succeeded by Claudio de Curtis
Preceded by Marco Antonio Marsilio	Archbishop of Salerno; 1591–1605	Succeeded by Juan Beltrán Guevara y Figueroa
