= Carlo Caputo =

Italian priest

- Bishop of Aversa
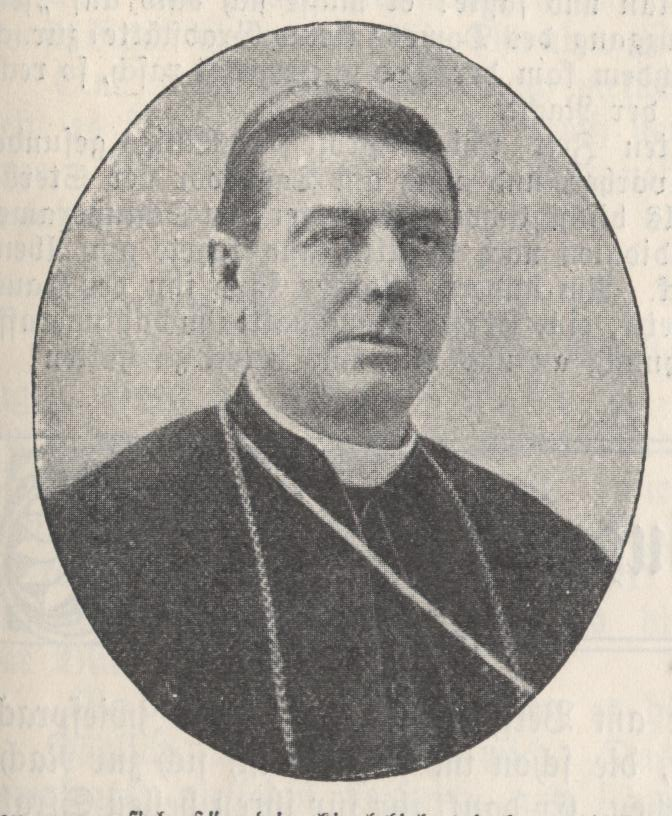
- Church: Catholic Church
- Diocese: Diocese of Aversa
- In office: 7 June 1886 – 19 April 1897
- Predecessor: Domenico Zelo
- Successor: Francesco Vento
- Other post: Titular Archbishop of Nicomedia (1897-1908)
- Previous posts: Apostolic Nuncio to Bavaria (1904-1907); Prelate of Altamura ed Acquaviva delle Fonti (1902-1904); Bishop of Monopoli (1883-1886)

Orders
- Ordination: 16 March 1867 by Sisto Riario Sforza
- Consecration: 25 May 1845 by Luigi Bilio

Personal details
- Born: 4 November 1843 Naples, Province of Naples, Kingdom of the Two Sicilies
- Died: 27 September 1908 (aged 64) Naples, Province of Naples, Kingdom of Italy

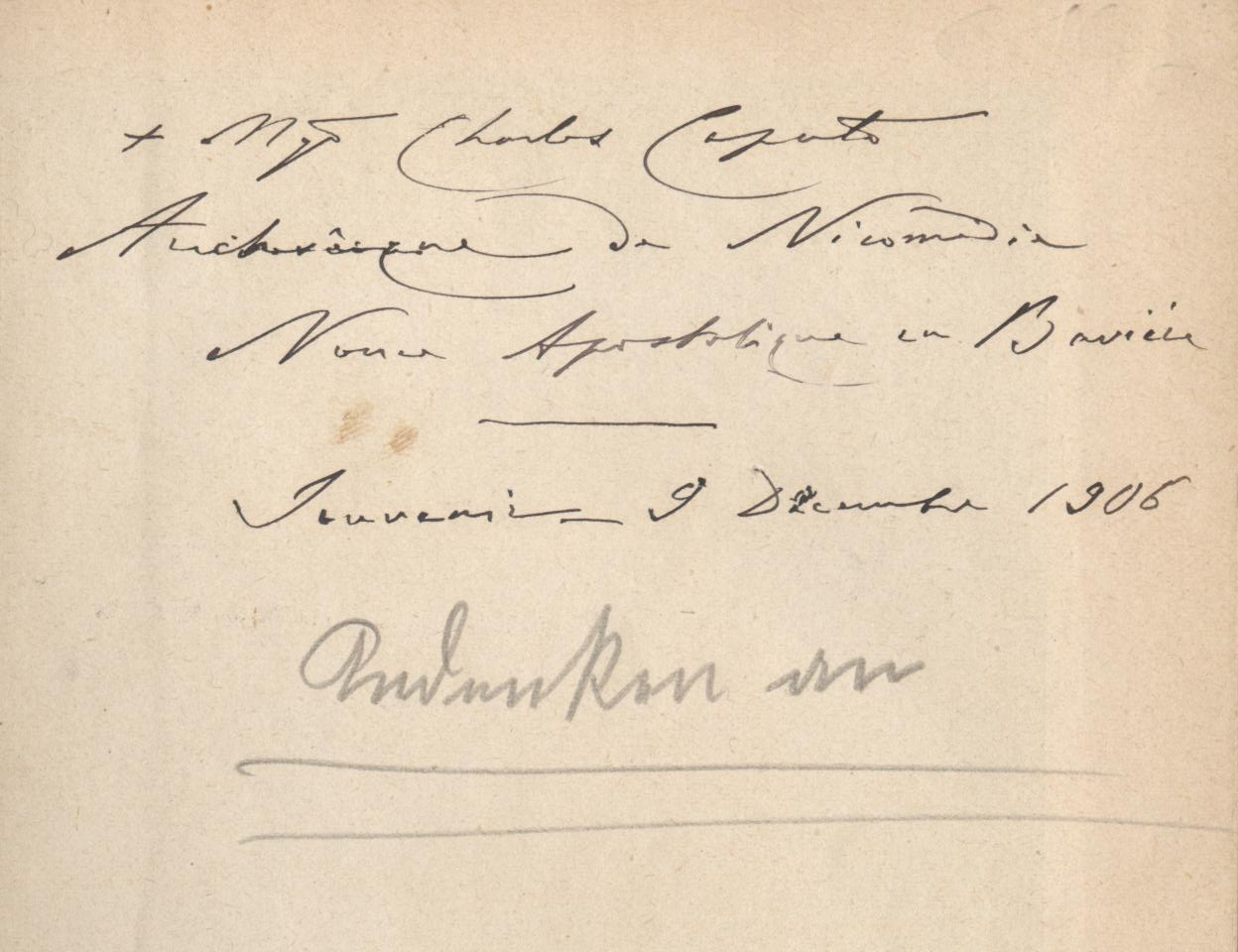
Caputo's French signature („+ Mgr. Charles Caputo, Archeveque de Nicomedia, Nonce Apostolique in Baviere“), 1906, from a book about pilgrimage to Altötting

Carlo Caputo (4 November 1843, Naples – 27 September 1908, Naples) was a Roman Catholic bishop. He was diocesan bishop of Monopoli and Aversa, then titular bishop of Nikomedia and from 1904 to 1907 apostolic nuncio to the Kingdom of Bavaria.

== Life ==
He studied in Naples and was ordained priest by cardinal Sisto Riario Sforza on 16 March 1867. He then studied at the academy for noble clergymen in Rome, where he entered the church's diplomatic service. He then worked in the Roman Curia as a speaker in the College of Cardinals for exceptional ecclesiastical affairs, before returning to Italy, where on 18 March 1883, he was appointed Bishop of Monopoli, receiving episcopal ordination on 15 May, the same year. He was promoted to Bishop of Aversa on 7 June 1886, where he stayed until 19 April 1897, the date on which he was made titular bishop of Nikomedia and head of the Territorial Prelature of Altamura-Gravina-Acquaviva delle Fonti. Caputo remained diocesan prelate until January 1904. He was made Apostolic Nuncio to Bavaria on 14 January 1904, based in Munich – there were no other nuncios in Germany so he also acted as nuncio for the rest of the country. He fell ill with stomach cancer and had to resign his nunciature in August 1907, returning to Naples, where he died a year later.
