= Roman Catholic Diocese of Monopoli =

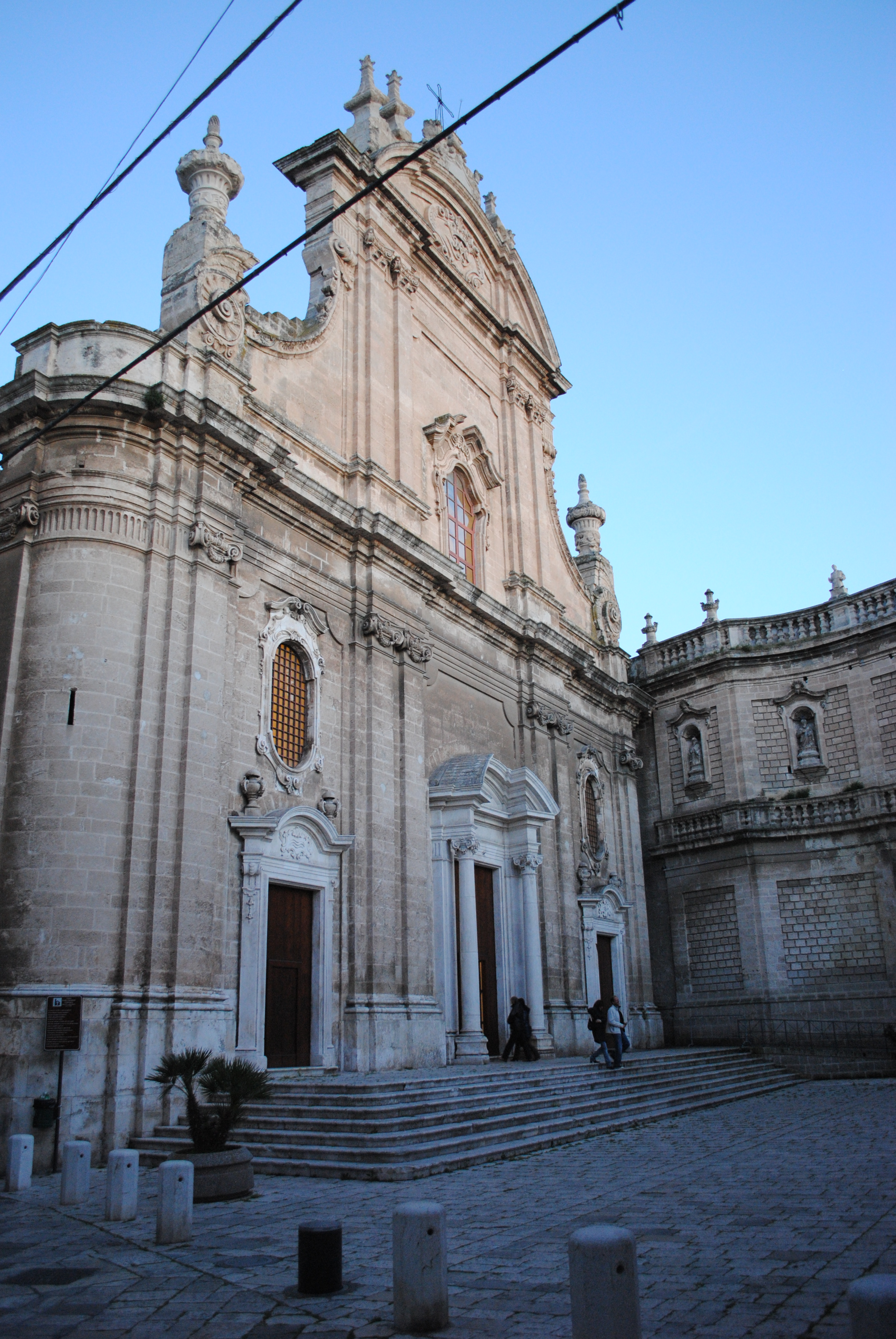
Cathedral in Monopoli

The Italian Catholic diocese of Monopoli, in the province of Bari, existed from the eleventh century to 1986. In that year it was united into the diocese of Conversano-Monopoli.

== History ==
The episcopal see at Monopoli was created in 1062, and its first prelate was Deodatus. The cathedral was erected by the second bishop, Romualdus, in 1073.

In 1118, the Diocese of Polignano, located in Polignano, a small town situated on a high promontory along the Adriatic, was united to this diocese. The diocese was historically immediately subject to the Holy See, but came under the archdiocese of Bari.

== Ordinaries ==
=== Diocese of Monopoli ===
Erected: 11th Century
Latin Name: Monopolitanus

...

- Dionigi di Borgo San Sepolcro (17 Mar 1340 – 31 Mar 1342 Died)

...

- Francesco Carbone (Dec 1382 – 17 Dec 1384 Appointed Cardinal-Priest of Santa Susanna)

...

- Marco de Teramo (24 Mar 1400 – 15 Dec 1404 Appointed, Bishop of Bertinoro)

...

- Giosuè Mormile (9 Mar 1413 – 18 Dec 1430 Appointed, Bishop of Sant'Agata de' Goti)

...

- Michele Claudio (1508– )

...

- Alfonso Alvarez Guerrero (2 Jul 1572 – 1577 Died)
- Alfonso Porzio (19 Jul 1577 – 1598 Died)
- Juan López (bishop of Crotone) (15 Nov 1598 – 1608 Resigned)
- Giovanni Giacomo Macedonio (17 Mar 1608 – 12 Sep 1624 Died)
- Giulio Masi (18 Jul 1627 – 1636 Died)
- Francesco Surgenti (Sorgente) (9 Jan 1640 – 13 Oct 1651 Died)
- Benedicto Sánchez de Herrera (12 Jan 1654 – 24 Mar 1664 Confirmed, Bishop of Pozzuoli)
- Giuseppe Cavalieri (José Caballero) (9 Jun 1664 – 14 Aug 1696 Died)
- Carolus de Tilly (3 Jun 1697 – 1698 Died)
- Gaetano De Andrea (15 Sep 1698 – Jan 1702 Died)
- Alfonso Francesco Dominquez (7 Apr 1704 – Feb 1706 Died)
- Nicola Centomani (11 Apr 1707 – Jan 1722 Died)
- Giulio Antonio Sacchi (14 Feb 1724 – Jul 1738 Died)
- Francesco Iorio (Jorio) (24 Nov 1738 – 15 Aug 1754 Died)
- Ciro de Alteriis (16 Dec 1754 – 6 Apr 1761 Confirmed, Bishop of Acerra)
- Giuseppe Cacace (25 May 1761 – 1778 Died)
- Domenico Russo (20 Mar 1780 – 1783 Died)
- Raimondo Fusco (14 Feb 1785 – 1802 Died)
- Lorenzo Villani (26 Jun 1805 – 10 Mar 1823 Died)
- Michele Palmieri (3 May 1824 – 24 Nov 1842 Died)
- Luigi Giamporcaro (17 Jun 1844 – 2 Jan 1854 Died)
- Francesco Pedicini (23 Mar 1855 – 27 Sep 1858 Appointed, Archbishop of Bari (-Canosa))
- Luigi Riccio (20 Jun 1859 – Confirmed – 23 Mar 1860 Confirmed, Bishop of Caiazzo)
- Federico Tolimieri (23 Mar 1860 – 2 Jun 1869 Died)
- Antonio Dalena (22 Dec 1871 – 18 Jan 1883 Died)
- Carlo Caputo (15 Mar 1883 – 7 Jun 1886 Appointed, Bishop of Aversa)
- Francesco d’Albore (7 Jun 1886 – 4 Sep 1901 Resigned)
- Francesco di Costanzo (4 Mar 1902 – 19 Dec 1912 Resigned)
- Nicola Monterisi (22 Aug 1913 – 15 Dec 1919 Appointed, Archbishop of Chieti)
- Agostino Migliore (14 Feb 1920 – 2 Dec 1925 Died)
- Antonio Melomo (7 Feb 1927 – 28 Aug 1940 Appointed, Archbishop of Conza-Sant'Angelo dei Lombardi-Bisaccia)
- Gustavo Bianchi (28 Mar 1941 – 12 Aug 1951 Died)
- Carlo Ferrari (17 Apr 1952 – 19 Oct 1967 Appointed, Bishop of Mantova)
- Antonio D’Erchia (29 Jun 1969 – 30 Sep 1986 Appointed, Bishop of Conversano-Monopoli)
