= Benedicto Sánchez de Herrera =

Most Reverend Benedicto Sánchez de Herrera
- Bishop of Pozzuoli
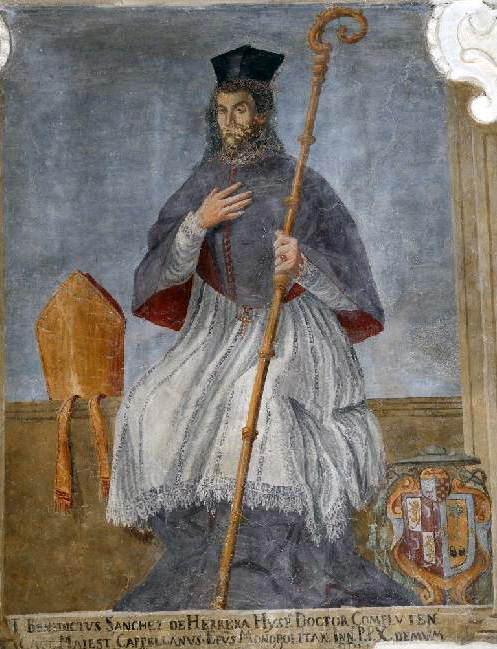
- Benito Sánchez de Herrera
- Church: Catholic Church
- Diocese: Diocese of Pozzuoli
- In office: 1664–1674
- Predecessor: Juan Bautista Verchi de Campania
- Successor: Carlo della Palma
- Previous post: Bishop of Monopoli (1654–1664)

Orders
- Consecration: 18 January 1654 by Giovanni Battista Maria Pallotta

Personal details
- Born: 1598 Navas de Jorquera, Spain
- Died: 14 June 1674 (aged 75–76) Pozzuoli, Italy

Benedicto Sánchez de Herrera or Benito Sánchez de Herrera (1598 – 14 June 1674) was a Roman Catholic prelate who served as Bishop of Pozzuoli (1664–1674), and Bishop of Monopoli (1654–1664).

== Biography ==
Benedicto Sánchez de Herrera was born in Navas de Jorquera, Spain in 1598. On 17 October 1653, he was selected by the King as Bishop of Monopoli and confirmed by Pope Innocent X on 12 January 1654. On 18 January 1654, he was consecrated bishop by Giovanni Battista Maria Pallotta, Cardinal-Priest of San Pietro in Vincoli, with Patrizio Donati, Bishop Emeritus of Minori, and Giuseppe Ciantes, Bishop of Marsico Nuovo, serving as co-consecrators. On 11 December 1663, he was selected as Bishop of Pozzuoli and confirmed by Pope Alexander VII on 24 March 1664. He served as Bishop of Pozzuoli until his death on 14 June 1674.

While bishop, he was the principal co-consecrator of Pascual de Aragón-Córdoba-Cardona y Fernández de Córdoba, Archbishop of Toledo (1666).

== External links and additional sources ==
- Cheney, David M. "Diocese of Monopoli". Catholic-Hierarchy.org. (for Chronology of Bishops) ^{[self-published]}
- Chow, Gabriel. "Diocese of Monopoli". GCatholic.org. (for Chronology of Bishops) ^{[self-published]}
- Cheney, David M. "Diocese of Pozzuoli". Catholic-Hierarchy.org. (for Chronology of Bishops)^{self-published}
- Chow, Gabriel. "Diocese of Pozzuoli". GCatholic.org. (for Chronology of Bishops)^{self-published}

Catholic Church titles
Preceded by Francesco Surgenti	Bishop of Monopoli; 1654–1664	Succeeded by Giuseppe Cavalieri
Preceded by Juan Bautista Verchi de Campania	Bishop of Pozzuoli; 1664–1674	Succeeded by Carlo della Palma
