= Marco de Teramo =

Most Reverend Marco de Teramo
- Bishop of Sarno
- Church: Catholic Church
- In office: 1418–1439

Personal details
- Died: 1439 Sarno, Italy

Marco de Teramo (died 1439) was a Roman Catholic prelate who served as Bishop of Sarno (1418–1439), Bishop of Bertinoro (1404–1418), and Bishop of Monopoli (1400–1404).

== Biography ==
On 24 March 1400, Marco de Teramo was appointed during the papacy of Pope Boniface IX as Bishop of Monopoli. On 15 December 1404, he was appointed during the papacy of Pope Innocent VII as Bishop of Bertinoro. On 29 December 1418, he was appointed during the papacy of Pope Martin V as Bishop of Sarno. He served as Bishop of Sarno until his death in 1439.

== Episcopal succession ==
While bishop, he was the principal consecrator of:

- Rodrigo Regina, Titular Bishop of Demetrias (1437);

and the principal co-consecrator of:

- Pandolfe de Malatesta, Bishop of Coutances (1420);
- Jean Guillaume Wilhjalmson, Bishop of Hólar (1426); and
- Marco Cobello, Bishop of Castro del Lazio (1437).

== External links and additional sources ==
- Cheney, David M. "Diocese of Monopoli". Catholic-Hierarchy.org. (for Chronology of Bishops) ^{[self-published]}
- Chow, Gabriel. "Diocese of Monopoli". GCatholic.org. (for Chronology of Bishops) ^{[self-published]}
- Cheney, David M. "Diocese of Bertinoro". Catholic-Hierarchy.org. (for Chronology of Bishops) ^{[self-published]}
- Chow, Gabriel. "Diocese of Bertinoro (Italy)". GCatholic.org. (for Chronology of Bishops) ^{[self-published]}
- Cheney, David M. "Diocese of Sarno". Catholic-Hierarchy.org. (for Chronology of Bishops) ^{[self-published]}
- Chow, Gabriel. "Diocese of Sarno (Italy)". GCatholic.org. (for Chronology of Bishops) ^{[self-published]}

Catholic Church titles
Preceded by	Bishop of Monopoli; 1400–1404	Succeeded by
Preceded by	Bishop of Bertinoro; 1404–1418	Succeeded by
Preceded by	Bishop of Sarno; 1418–1439	Succeeded by
