= Bertinoro Cathedral =

Cathedral in Bertinoro, Italy

Coordinates: 44.1489°N 12.1326°E

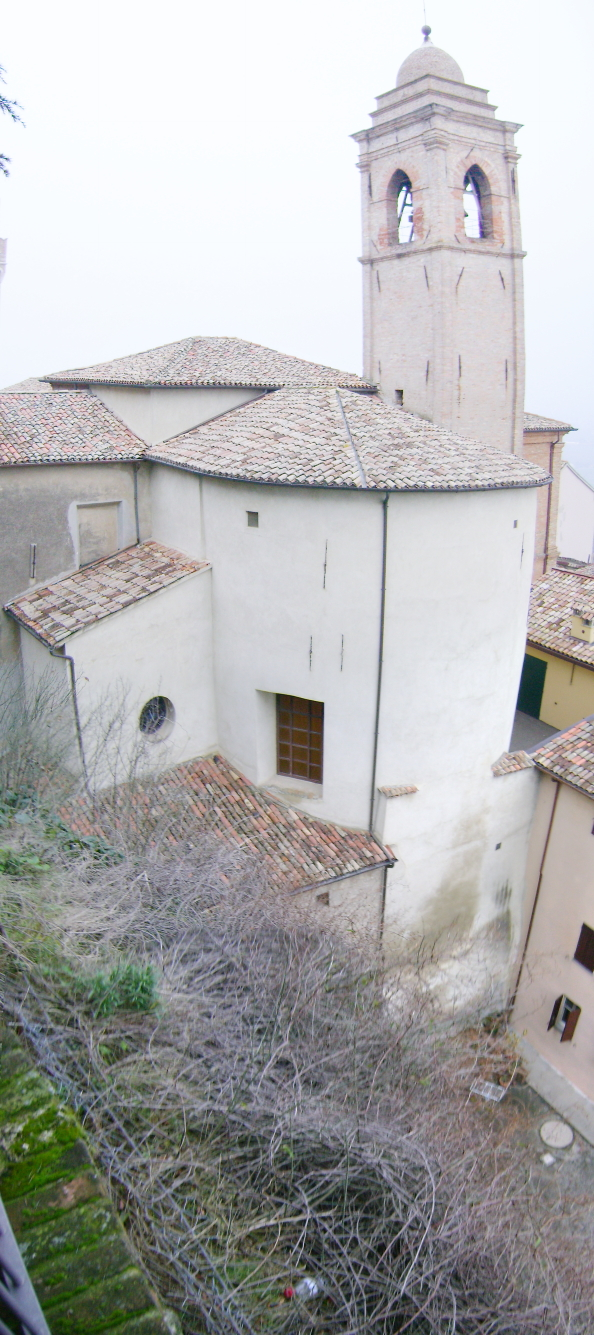
The apse

Bertinoro Cathedral (Italian: Duomo di Bertinoro; Concattedrale di Santa Caterina) is a Roman Catholic cathedral in Bertinoro in the province of Forlì-Cesena, Italy. It is dedicated to Saint Catherine of Alexandria. Formerly the seat of the bishops of Bertinoro, it is now a co-cathedral in the diocese of Forlì-Bertinoro,

== History ==
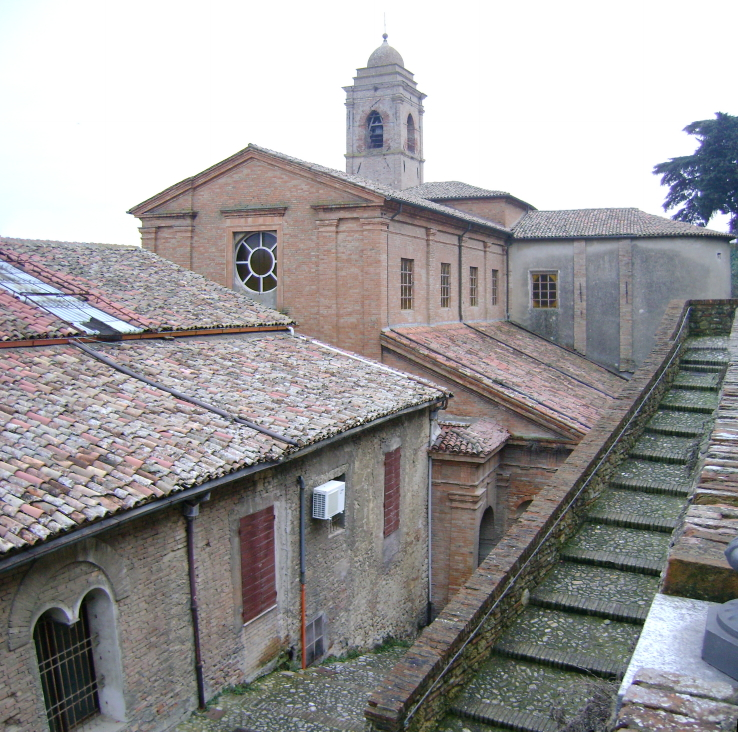
Cathedral from the west

The first religious building dedicated to Saint Catherine on the site was a small oratory, demolished at the end of the 16th century and rebuilt as the present cathedral in Bramantesque style by order of Bishop Giovanni Andrea Caligari; work finished in the 17th century. In its final position it backed onto the Palazzo Comunale, because it was believed that the latter was about to be demolished because of its instability, which however did not happen.

== Description ==
The nave is subdivided into three aisles. The cathedral contains several works of art, including: a painting of The Virgin between Saints Peter and Paul, by Francesco Longhi; The mystical nights of St. Catherine of Alexandria, an 18th-century painting of the Bolognese School, on the high altar; and a carved wooden crucifix of the Italian-German school on the north altar, part of which appears to date from the 16th century. There is a legend that the maker of this work was a pilgrim who, after three days of retreat in a monastery, on his departure discovered the crucifix growing from a fig tree in the garden of the building.

Under the cathedral is a crypt with external access.

== Gallery ==
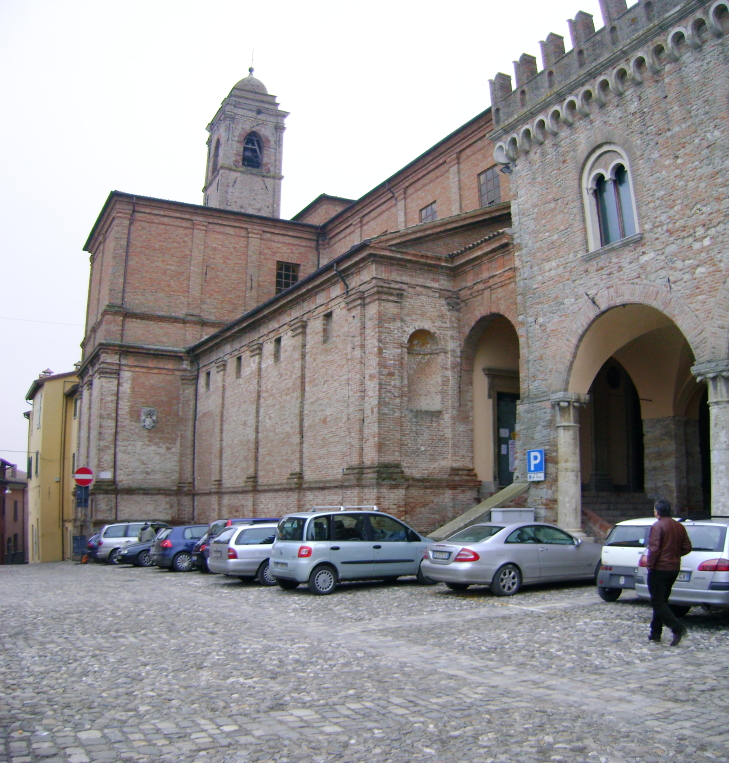
Exterior view

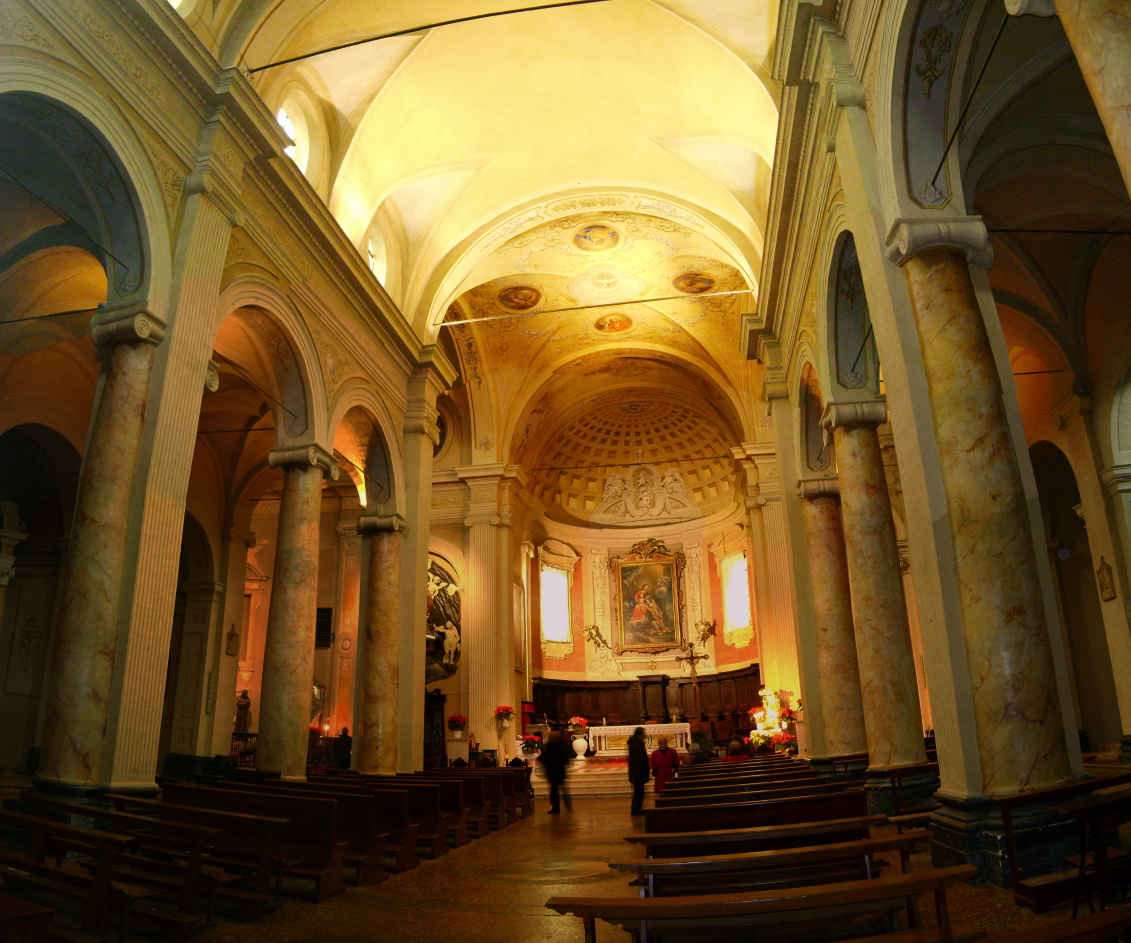
Interior
