= Archdiocese of Lanciano-Ortona =

Latin Catholic archdiocese in Italy

Coordinates: 42.2312°N 14.3904°E

Archdiocese of Lanciano-Ortona Archidioecesis Lancianensis-Ortonensis

Catholic
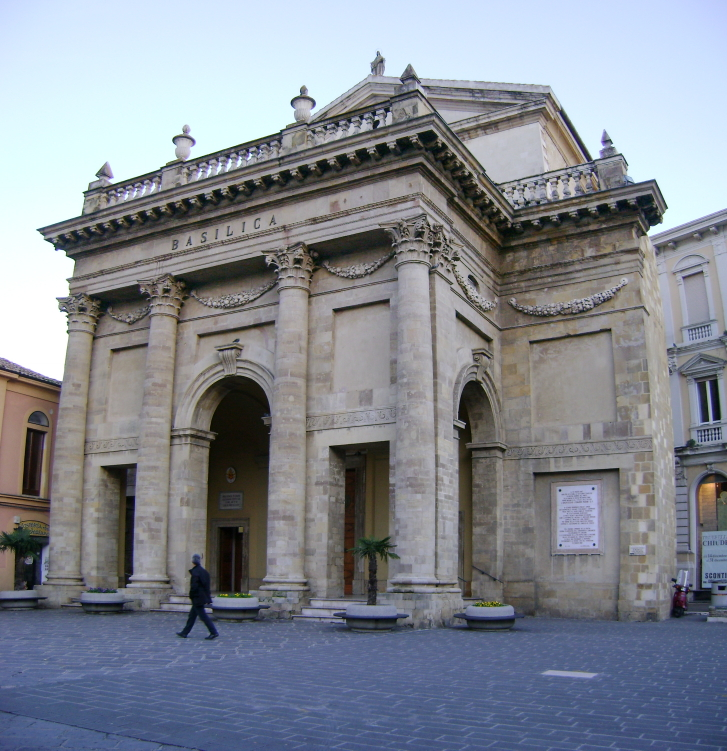
- Cathedral of Lanciano

Location
- Country: Italy
- Ecclesiastical province: Chieti-Vasto

Statistics
- Area: 305 km^{2} (118 sq mi)
- Population: Total; Catholics: (as of 2023); 83,109 ▼; 82,210 ▼ (98.9%)
- Parishes: 42

Information
- Denomination: Catholic Church
- Sui iuris church: Latin Church
- Rite: Roman Rite
- Established: 27 April 1515 (511 years ago)
- Cathedral: Basilica Cattedrale della Madonna del Ponte (Lanciano)
- Co-cathedral: Basilica Concattedrale di S. Tommaso Apostolo (Ortona)
- Secular priests: 46 (diocesan) ▲28 (religious orders) ▲10 Permanent Deacons ▲

Current leadership
- Pope: Leo XIV
- Archbishop: Emidio Cipollone
- Bishops emeritus: Carlo Ghidelli

Map
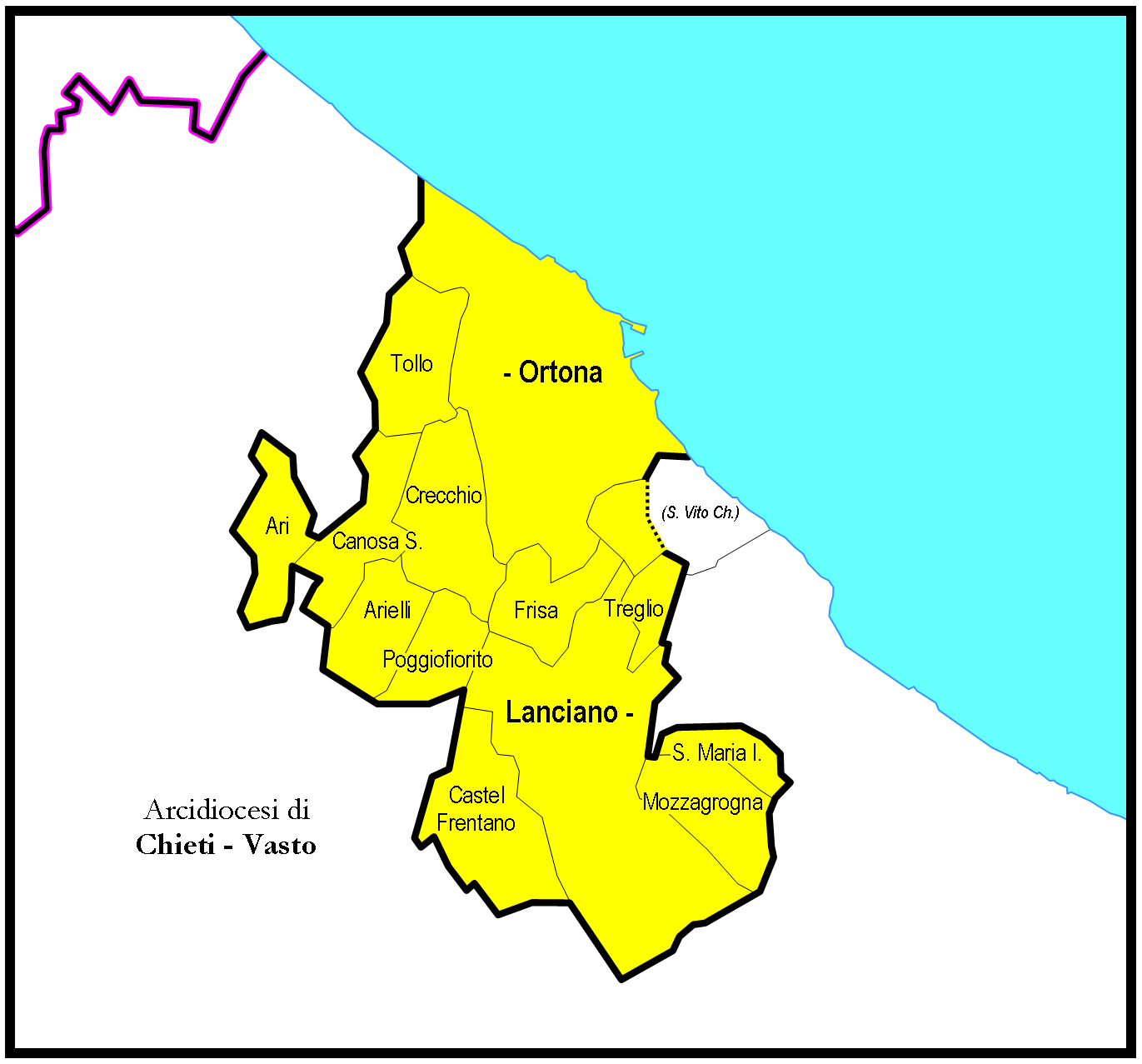

Website
- Arcidiocesi Lanciano-Ortona (in Italian)

The Archdiocese of Lanciano-Ortona (Latin: Archidioecesis Lancianensis-Ortonensis) is a Latin Church diocese of the Catholic Church that has existed under this name since 1986. Since 1982, it has been a suffragan of the Archdiocese of Chieti-Vasto.

The historical Diocese of Lanciano was created in 1515. It was united with the Diocese of Ortona from 1818 to 1834, and again in 1986. The archbishop of Lanciano was Perpetual Administrator of the diocese of Ortona from 1834 to 1982, and then held the two dioceses aeque personaliter until 1986, when Ortona was permanently suppressed.

== History ==
Until 1515 Lanciano was subject to the Bishop of Chieti. In 1515, Pope Leo X created Lanciano a separate diocese, and made it immediately subject to the Holy See, making the bishop of Chieti both angry and jealous. In 1562 Pope Pius IV, to end a dispute with that bishop, made it an archdiocese without suffragans. The first bishop was Angelo Maccafani; the first archbishop was the Dominican Leonardo Marini (1560).

Ortona was an episcopal see in the time of Gregory the Great, who mentions the Bishop Calumniosus and his predecessor Blandinus. Another bishop was Joannes, who in 916 was the papal legate at the Council of Altheim. There is no record of a Bishop of Ortona after the tenth century. Pope Pius V in 1570 re-established the see, to which in 1569 the diocese of Campli was united.

=== Restoration ===
Following the extinction of the Napoleonic Kingdom of Italy, the Congress of Vienna authorized the restoration of the Papal States and the Kingdom of Naples. It was imperative that Pope Pius VII and King Ferdinand IV reach agreement on restoration and restitution. Ferdinand, however, demanded the suppression of fifty dioceses. On 17 July 1816, King Ferdinand issued a decree, in which he forbade the reception of any papal document without prior reception of the royal exequatur. This meant that prelates could not receive bulls of appointment, consecration, or installation without the king's permission.

A concordat was finally signed on 16 February 1818, and ratified by Pius VII on 25 February 1818. Ferdinand issued the concordat as a law on 21 March 1818. The right of the king to nominate the candidate for a vacant bishopric was recognized, as in the Concordat of 1741, subject to papal confirmation (preconisation). On 27 June 1818, Pius VII issued the bull De Ulteriore, in which the diocese of Ortona was suppressed, and its ecclesiastical territory was assigned to the archdiocese of Lanciano. When, in 1818, Ortona was joined to Lanciano, the territory of the diocese of Campli was assigned to the diocese of Teramo.

On 17 June 1834, Pope Gregory XVI issued the bull Ecclesiarum omnium, in which the arrangement made in 1818 was reversed. The diocese of Ortona was restored, and the cathedral which had been reduced to the status of a collegiate church was restored to cathedral status. It's college of clerics again became the canons of the cathedral Chapter of Ortona. The finances of the old diocese of Ortona, which had been incorporated into those of the diocese of Lanciano, were again separated. The one exception to the return to the status quo ante was the seminary. It was deemed more efficient for both dioceses to use the seminary of Lanciano on equal terms. The archbishop of Lanciano became the "Perpetual Administrator of the Church of Ortona."

On 10 September 1881, a major earthquake caused considerable damage in Lanciano and in Orsogna, with some loss of life and many injuries. In Orsogna, 14 km (9 mi) west of Lanciano, all six churches were damaged or fell.

=== New ecclesiastical province ===
On 2 March 1982, Pope John Paul II issued the bull, Fructuosae Ecclesiae, in which he created the new ecclesiastical province of Chieti (Theatina), granting it as suffragan dioceses Vasto, Lanciano and Ortona. The metropolitan status of Lanciano was cancelled, though its archbishop was permitted to retain the title of archbishop. The diocese of Ortona was joined to the archdiocese of Lanciano aeque principaliter, that is, one single bishop was bishop of two dioceses at the same time.

In 2015 Lanciano celebrated the 500th anniversary of the diocese.

== Bishops and archbishops ==
=== Diocese of Lanciano ===
Erected: 27 April 1515
Latin Name: Lancianensis

- Angelo Maccafani (1515 – 1517)

Sede vacante (1517–1532)

- Egidio da Viterbo, O.E.S.A. (1532)

Sede vacante (1532–1535)

- Michele Fortini, O.P. (1535 – 1539)
- Juan Salazar Fernández (1540 – 1555)
- Pompeo Piccolomini (1556 – 1560)
- Leonardo Marini, O.P. (26 Jan 1560 – 1566)

=== Archdiocese of Lanciano ===
Elevated: 9 February 1562
Latin Name: Lancianensis

Sede vacante (1566 – 1568)

- Ettore Piscicelli (1568 – 1569)
- Antonio Gaspar Rodríguez, O.F.M. (1570 – 1578)
- Mario Bolognini (1579 – 1588)
- Paolo Tasso (1588 – 1607)

Sede vacante (1607 – 1610)

- Lorenzo Monzonís Galatina, O.F.M. (1610 – 1617)
- Francisco Romero, O. Carm. (14 May 1618 – 1621)
- Andrea Gervasi (24 Jan 1622 – 9 Aug 1668 Died)
- Alfonso Álvarez Barba Ossorio, O. Carm. (9 Sep 1669 – 1673)
- Francesco Antonio Carafa, C.R. (27 May 1675 – 1687)
- Manuel de la Torre Gutiérrez, O. de M. (9 Aug 1688 – 21 Jul 1694 Died)
- Giovanni Andrea Monreale (4 Jul 1695 – 1696)
- Bernabé de Castro, O.S.A. (25 Feb 1697 – 1700)
- Giovanni Uva, O.F.M. (18 Apr 1701 – Jan 1717)
- Antonio Paternò (8 Feb 1719 – 1730)
- Arcangelo Maria Luc Thomas Ciccarelli, O.P. (1731 – 1738)
- Domenico Angelo de Pace (26 Jan 1739 – 7 Mar 1745)
- Anton Ludovico Antinori, C.O. (21 Jun 1745 Confirmed – 1754)
- Giacomo Lieto (20 May 1754 Confirmed – 5 Feb 1769)
- Domenico Gervasoni (20 Nov 1769 Confirmed – Nov 1784 Died)
- Francesco Saverio de Vivo (18 Dec 1786 Confirmed – 1792)
- Francesco Amoroso (27 Feb 1792 Confirmed – 8 Jul 1807 Died)

Sede vacante (1807 – 1818)

=== Archdiocese of Lanciano ===
- Francesco Maria de Luca, O.F.M. (6 Apr 1818 Confirmed – 13 Jan 1839 Died)

=== Archdiocese of Lanciano ===
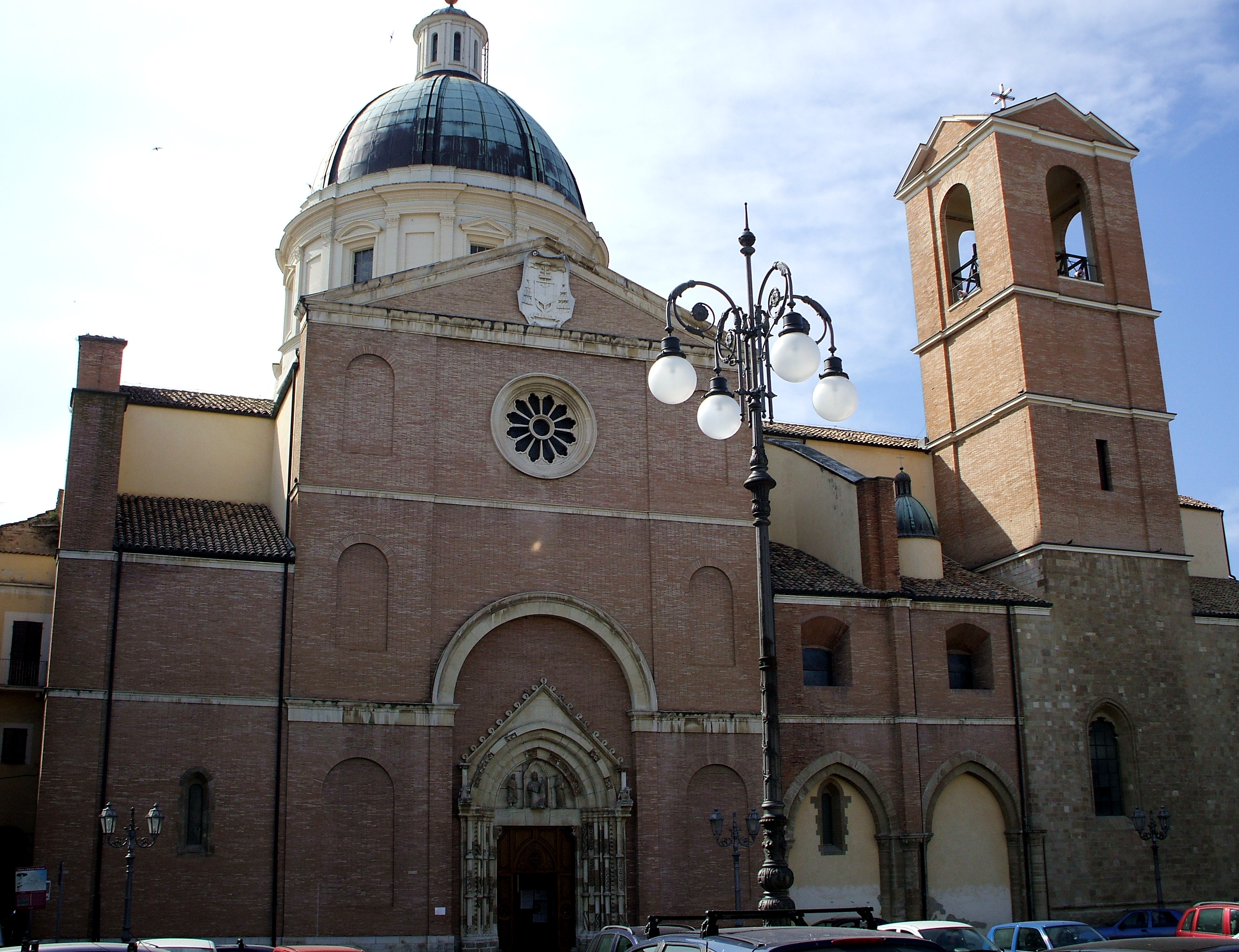
Co-cathedral-Basilica in Ortona

In 1834, the diocese of Ortona was restored, in perpetual administratorship by Lanciano

- Ludovico Rizzuti (23 Dec 1839 Confirmed – 4 Aug 1848 Died)
- Giacomo de Vincentiis (22 Dec 1848 – 5 May 1866 Died)
- Francesco Maria Petrarca (23 Feb 1872 – 26 Dec 1895 Died)
- Angelo Della Cioppa (22 Jun 1896 – 29 Jan 1917 Died)
- Nicola Piccirilli (25 Apr 1918 – 4 Mar 1939 Died)
- Francesco Pietro Tesauri (25 May 1939 – 25 Aug 1945 Died)
- Gioacchino Di Leo (18 Feb 1946 – 5 Jul 1950 Appointed, Archbishop (Personal Title) of Mazara del Vallo)
- Benigno Luciano Migliorini, O.F.M. (13 Mar 1951 – 1 Jul 1962 Died)
- Pacifico Maria Luigi Perantoni, O.F.M. (21 Aug 1962 – 14 Aug 1974 Retired)
- Leopoldo Teofili (14 Aug 1974 – 22 Dec 1981 Died)

=== Archdiocese of Lanciano e Ortona ===
The two dioceses held by a single bishop, 1982–1986

- Enzio d'Antonio (13 May 1982 – 25 Nov 2000 Retired)

=== Archdiocese of Lanciano-Ortona ===
1986: Diocese of Ortona suppressed

- Carlo Ghidelli (25 Nov 2000 – 11 Oct 2010 Retired)
- Emidio Cipollone (11 Oct 2010 – )

== See also ==
- Diocese of Ortona

== Books ==
=== Reference works ===
- Gams, Pius Bonifatius (1873). Series episcoporum Ecclesiae catholicae (in Latin). Ratisbon: Typis et Sumptibus Georgii Josephi Manz. p. 888.
- Eubel, Conradus; Gulik, Guilelmus (1923). Hierarchia catholica (in Latin). Vol. III (second ed.). Münster: Libreria Regensbergiana.
- Gauchat, Patritius (Patrice) (1935). Hierarchia catholica (in Latin). Vol. IV (1592-1667). Münster: Libraria Regensbergiana.
- Ritzler, Remigius; Sefrin, Pirminus (1952). Hierarchia catholica medii et recentis aevi (in Latin). Vol. V (1667-1730). Patavii: Messagero di S. Antonio.
- Ritzler, Remigius; Sefrin, Pirminus (1958). Hierarchia catholica medii et recentis aevi (in Latin). Vol. VI (1730-1799). Patavii: Messagero di S. Antonio.
- Ritzler, Remigius; Sefrin, Pirminus (1968). Hierarchia Catholica medii et recentioris aevi... (in Latin). Vol. VII (1800–1846). Monasterii: Libr. Regensburgiana.
- Remigius Ritzler; Pirminus Sefrin (1978). Hierarchia catholica Medii et recentioris aevi (in Latin). Vol. VIII (1846–1903). Il Messaggero di S. Antonio.
- Pięta, Zenon (2002). Hierarchia catholica medii et recentioris aevi... (in Latin). Vol. IX (1903-1922). Padua: Messagero di San Antonio. ISBN 978-88-250-1000-8.

=== Studies ===
- Cappelletti, Giuseppe (1870). Le chiese d'Italia dalla loro origine sino ai nostri giorni (in Italian). Vol. vigesimoprimo (21). Venezia: Antonelli. pp. 87–90.
- D'Avino, Vincenzo (1848). Cenni storici sulle chiese arcivescovili, vescovili, e prelatizie (nulluis) del Regno delle Due Sicilie (in Italian). Napoli: Ranucci. pp. 287–291.
- Renzetti, Luigi (1887). Il santuario di Nostra Donna del Ponte e i vescovi ed arcivescovi della città di Lanciano : note storiche. (in Italian). Lanciano: tip. F. Tommasini, 1887.
- Ughelli, Ferdinando; Coleti, Niccolo (1720). Italia Sacra Sive De Episcopis Italiae (in Latin). Vol. Tomus sextus (6). Venezia: Coleti. pp. 786–794.

==== External links ====
- Enzio d'Antonio, "La genesi storica della Chiesa Frentana". Arcidiocesi Lanciano-Ortona. Retrieved: 29 January 2023.
- Gabriel Chow, GCatholic, GCatholic.org page.
- David M. Cheney, Catholic-hierarchy.org, diocese of Ortona.
