= Giovanni Giacomo Macedonio =

Most Reverend Giovanni Giacomo Macedonio
- Bishop of Monopoli
- Church: Catholic Church
- Diocese: Diocese of Monopoli
- In office: 1608–1627
- Predecessor: Juan López
- Successor: Giulio Masi

Orders
- Consecration: 23 Mar 1608 by Giovanni Garzia Mellini

Giovanni Giacomo Macedonio (1563–1637) was a Roman Catholic prelate who served as Bishop of Monopoli (1608–1627).

== Biography ==
Giovanni Giacomo Macedonio was born in Naples, Italy in 1563. On 17 Mar 1608, he was appointed during the papacy of Pope Paul V as Bishop of Monopoli. On 23 Mar 1608, he was consecrated bishop by Giovanni Garzia Mellini, Bishop of Imola. He served as Bishop of Monopoli until his death on 27 Sep 1627.

== External links and additional sources ==
- Cheney, David M. "Diocese of Monopoli". Catholic-Hierarchy.org. (for Chronology of Bishops) ^{[self-published]}
- Chow, Gabriel. "Diocese of Monopoli". GCatholic.org. (for Chronology of Bishops) ^{[self-published]}

Catholic Church titles
Preceded by Juan López	Bishop of Monopoli; 1608–1627	Succeeded by Giulio Masi
