= Claudio de Curtis =

16th-century Roman Catholic prelate

Most Reverend Claudio de Curtis
- Bishop of Cefalù
- Church: Catholic Church
- Diocese: Diocese of Crotone
- In office: 1591–1595
- Predecessor: Mario Bolognini
- Successor: Juan López (bishop of Crotone)

Orders
- Consecration: 16 February 1592 by Giulio Antonio Santorio

Personal details
- Died: 1595 Cefalù, Italy

Claudio de Curtis (died 1595) was a Roman Catholic prelate who served as Bishop of Crotone (1591–1595).

== Biography ==
On 3 November 1591, Claudio de Curtis was appointed during the papacy of Pope Innocent IX as Bishop of Crotone. On 16 February 1592, he was consecrated bishop by Giulio Antonio Santorio, Cardinal-Priest of San Bartolomeo all'Isola, with Flaminio Filonardi, Bishop of Aquino, and Leonard Abel, Titular Bishop of Sidon, serving as co-consecrators. He served as Bishop of Crotone until his death in 1595.

== External links and additional sources ==
- Cheney, David M. "Archdiocese of Crotone-Santa Severina". Catholic-Hierarchy.org. (for Chronology of Bishops) ^{[self-published]}
- Chow, Gabriel. "Archdiocese of Crotone-Santa Severina". GCatholic.org. (for Chronology of Bishops) ^{[self-published]}

Catholic Church titles
Preceded by Mario Bolognini	Bishop of Crotone; 1591–1595	Succeeded by Juan López (bishop of Crotone)
