= Juan López (bishop of Crotone) =

Italian Catholic bishop (died 1632)

Most Reverend Juan López
- Church: Catholic Church
- Diocese: Diocese of Monopoli
- In office: 1598–1608
- Predecessor: Alfonso Porzio
- Successor: Giovanni Giacomo Macedonio

Orders
- Consecration: 11 June 1595 by Alfonso Pisani

Personal details
- Died: 1632

Juan López, O.P. (died 1632) was a Roman Catholic prelate who served as Bishop of Monopoli (1598–1608) and Bishop of Crotone (1595–1598).

== Biography ==
Juan López was ordained a priest in the Order of Preachers. On 5 June 1595, he was appointed during the papacy of Pope Clement VIII as Bishop of Crotone. On 11 June 1595, he was consecrated bishop by Alfonso Pisani, Archbishop of Santa Severina with Leonard Abel, Titular Bishop of Sidon, and Cristóbal Senmanat y Robuster, Bishop Emeritus of Orihuela serving as co-consecrators. On 15 November 1598, he was appointed during the papacy of Pope Clement VIII as Bishop of Monopoli. He served as Bishop of Monopoli until his resignation in 1608. He died in 1632.

While bishop, he was the principal co-consecrator of Alonso González Aguilar, Bishop of León (1613); and Cristóbal Martínez de Salas, Bishop of Panamá (1626).

== External links and additional sources ==
- Cheney, David M. "Archdiocese of Crotone-Santa Severina". Catholic-Hierarchy.org. (for Chronology of Bishops) ^{[self-published]}
- Chow, Gabriel. "Archdiocese of Crotone-Santa Severina". GCatholic.org. (for Chronology of Bishops) ^{[self-published]}
- Cheney, David M. "Diocese of Monopoli". Catholic-Hierarchy.org. (for Chronology of Bishops) ^{[self-published]}
- Chow, Gabriel. "Diocese of Monopoli". GCatholic.org. (for Chronology of Bishops) ^{[self-published]}

Catholic Church titles
Preceded by Claudio de Curtis	Bishop of Crotone; 1595–1598	Succeeded by Tommaso Monti
Preceded by Alfonso Porzio	Bishop of Monopoli; 1598–1608	Succeeded by Giovanni Giacomo Macedonio
