= Giulio Masi =

17th-century Catholic bishop

Most Reverend Giulio Masi
- Bishop of Monopoli
- Church: Catholic Church
- Diocese: Diocese of Monopoli
- In office: 1627–1636
- Predecessor: Giovanni Giacomo Macedonio
- Successor: Francesco Surgenti

Orders
- Consecration: 23 May 1611 by Roberto Francesco Romolo Bellarmino

Personal details
- Born: 1570 Arezzo, Italy
- Died: 1636 (age 66) Monopoli, Italy

Giulio Masi (1570–1636) was a Catholic prelate who served as Bishop of Monopoli (1627–1636) and Bishop of Giovinazzo (1611–1627).

== Biography ==
Giulio Masi was born in Arezzo, Italy in 1570. On 18 May 1611, he was appointed during the papacy of Pope Paul V as Bishop of Giovinazzo. On 23 May 1611, he was consecrated bishop by Roberto Francesco Romolo Bellarmino, Cardinal-Priest of San Matteo in Merulana, with Attilio Amalteo, Titular Archbishop of Athenae, and Antonio d'Aquino, Bishop of Sarno, serving as co-consecrators. On 18 July 1627, he was appointed during the papacy of Pope Urban VIII as Bishop of Monopoli. He served as Bishop of Monopoli until his death in 1636.

== External links and additional sources ==
- Cheney, David M. "Diocese of Giovinazzo e Terlizzi". Catholic-Hierarchy.org. (for Chronology of Bishops) ^{[self-published]}
- Chow, Gabriel. "Diocese of Giovinazzo (Italy)". GCatholic.org. (for Chronology of Bishops) ^{[self-published]}
- Cheney, David M. "Diocese of Monopoli". Catholic-Hierarchy.org. (for Chronology of Bishops) ^{[self-published]}
- Chow, Gabriel. "Diocese of Monopoli". GCatholic.org. (for Chronology of Bishops) ^{[self-published]}

Catholic Church titles
Preceded by Gregorio Santacroce	Bishop of Giovinazzo; 1611–1627	Succeeded by Carlo Maranta
Preceded by Giovanni Giacomo Macedonio	Bishop of Monopoli; 1627–1636	Succeeded by Francesco Surgenti
