= Cornelio Musso =

16th-century Roman Catholic bishop

Most Reverend Cornelio Musso
- Bishop of Bitonto
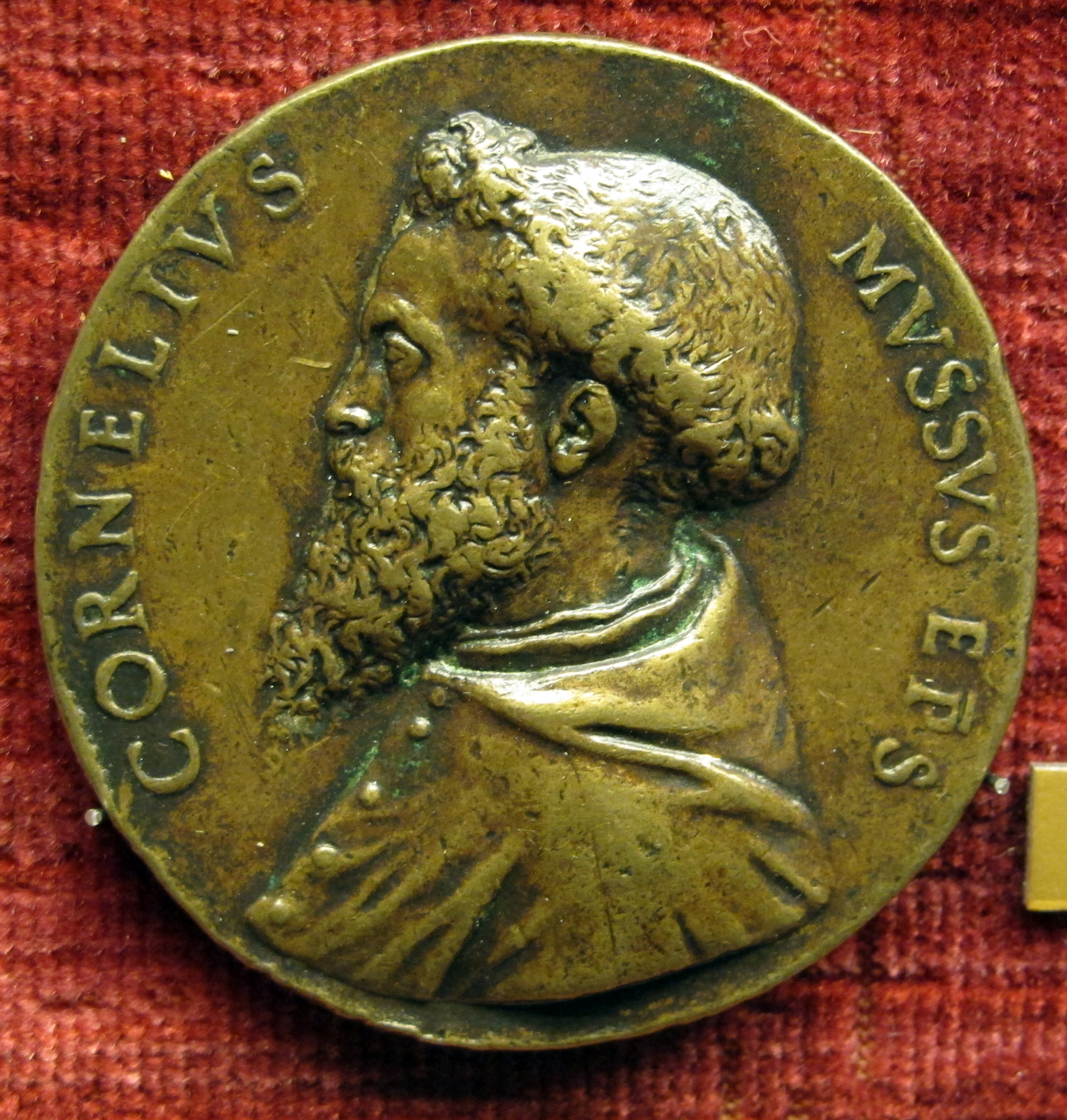
- Church: Catholic Church
- Diocese: Diocese of Bitonto
- In office: 1544–1574
- Predecessor: Alessandro Farnese (iuniore)
- Successor: Giovanni Pietro Fortiguerra
- Previous post: Bishop of Bertinoro (1541–1544)

Personal details
- Born: 1511
- Died: 13 Jan 1574 (age 63)

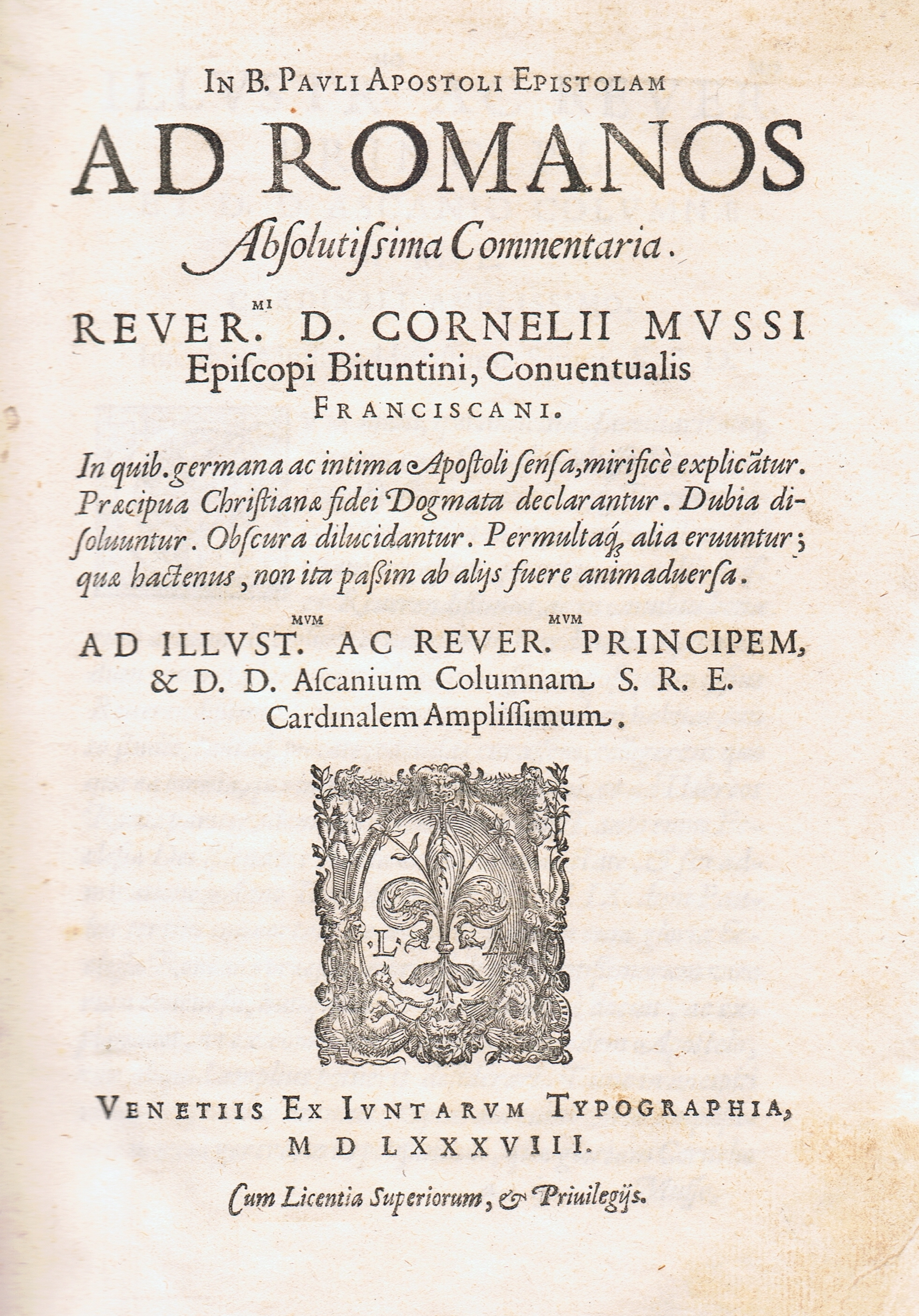
Title page of Musso’s "Comment. in epist. ad Romanos" (Venice, 1588)

Cornelio Musso (or Cornelius) (1511–1574) was an Italian Friar Minor Conventual, Bishop of Bitonto (1544–1574), Bishop of Bertinoro (1541–1544), and prominent at the Council of Trent. He was, perhaps, the most renowned orator of his day, styled the "Italian Demosthenes". Returning to ancient patristic models, he raised the homily to a high form of perfection.

== Biography ==
Musso was born at Piacenza. On 14 Nov 1541, he was appointed during the papacy of Pope Paul III as Bishop of Bertinoro. On 27 Oct 1544, he was transferred by Pope Paul III to the Diocese of Bitonto. He served as Bishop of Bitonto until his death on 13 Jan 1574. He was among the first three bishops present at the Council of Trent, where he delivered the inaugural oration, distinguishing himself especially at the debates on justification. In 1560 he was sent as papal legate to Emperor Ferdinand.

He served as Bishop of Bitonto until his death on 13 Jan 1574. Musso was buried in the Basilica of Santi Apostoli, the Curia of the Order of Friars Minor Conventual, in Rome.

== Works ==
Musso wrote:

- De divina historia libri tres (Venice, 1585; 1587)
- Comment. in epist. ad Romanos (Venice, 1588)
- De operibus sex dierum (Venice, 1598)

His Conciones evangeliorum and Sermones (ed. by Jos. Musso, Venice, 1580) were translated into Latin by Michael ab Isselt (Cologne, 1594).

== Episcopal succession ==
While bishop, he was the principal consecrator of:

- Sisto Diuzioli, Bishop of Carinola (1572);

and the principal co-consecrator of:

- Gian Antonio Fassano, Titular Bishop of Christopolis and Auxiliary Bishop of Monreale;
- Giovanni Antonio Lazzari, Bishop of Amelia (1572);
- Jakob Feucht, Titular Bishop of Athyra and Auxiliary Bishop of Bamberg (1572);
- Giulio Fioretti, Bishop of Chiron (1572); and
- César Alamagna Cardona, Bishop of Cava de' Tirreni (1572).

Catholic Church titles
Preceded by Girolamo Verallo	Bishop of Bertinoro; 1541–1544	Succeeded by Tommaso Caselli
Preceded by Alessandro Farnese (iuniore)	Bishop of Bitonto; 1544–1574	Succeeded by Giovanni Pietro Fortiguerra
