= Lanciano Cathedral =

Roman Catholic cathedral in Lanciano, Chieti, Italy

Lanciano Catedral Basilica Cattedrale della Madonna del Ponte
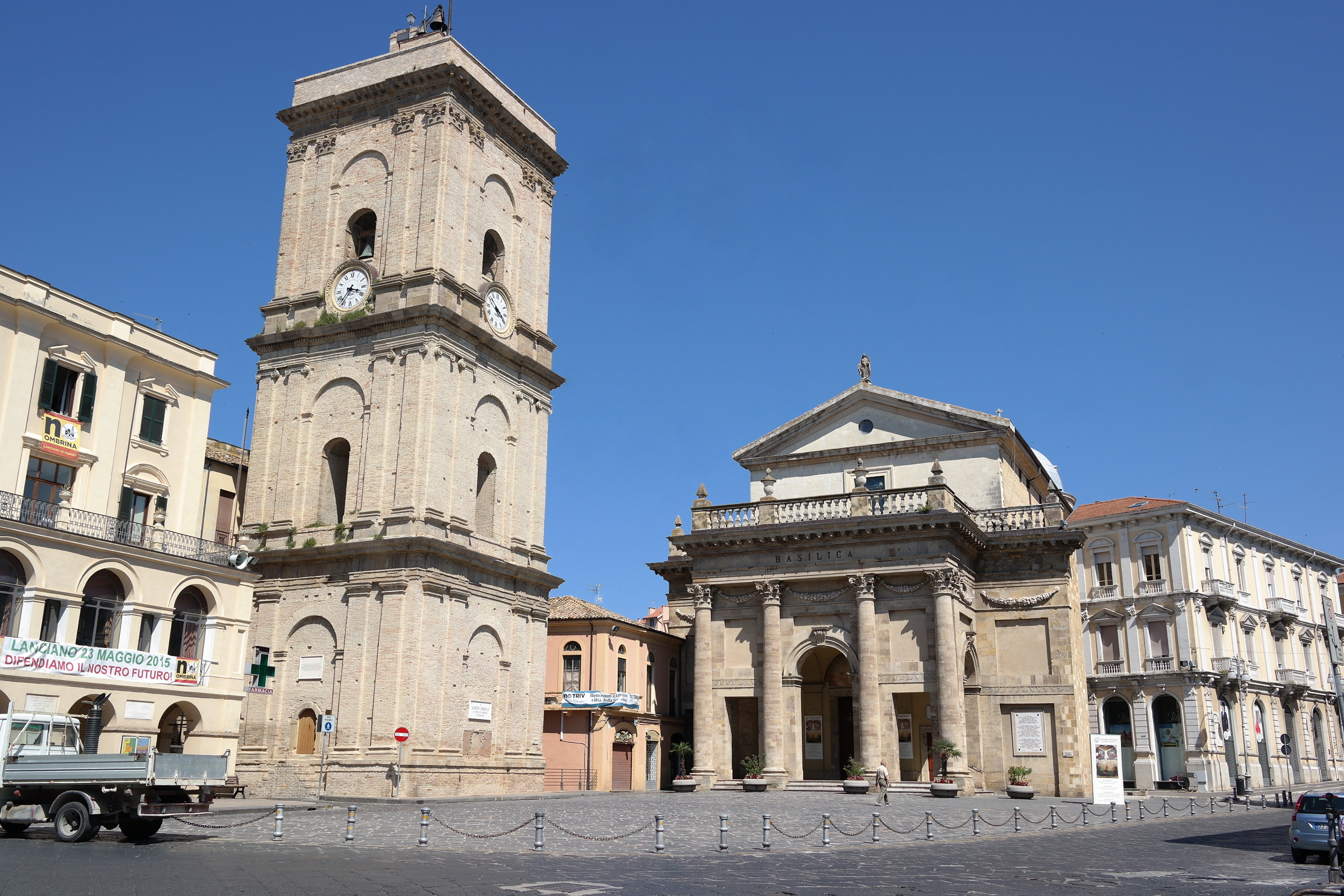
- West front of the cathedral, with the campanile to the left

Religion
- Affiliation: Roman Catholic Church
- Province: Archdiocese of Lanciano-Ortona
- Region: Abruzzo
- Rite: Roman Rite

Location
- Location: Lanciano
- State: Italy
- Interactive map of Lanciano Catedral; Basilica Cattedrale della Madonna del Ponte
- Coordinates: 42.230783°N 14.390764°E

Architecture
- Architect: Eugenio Michitelli
- Type: Church
- Style: Neoclassical
- Groundbreaking: 18th century
- Completed: 18th century

Lanciano Cathedral (Italian: Basilica Cattedrale della Madonna del Ponte) dedicated to the Virgin Mary as Santa Maria del Ponte ("Saint Mary of the Bridge") is the duomo of Lanciano in Chieti, Italy, and the cathedral church of the Archdiocese of Lanciano-Ortona. In February 1909 Pope Pius X raised it to the status of minor basilica.

== History ==
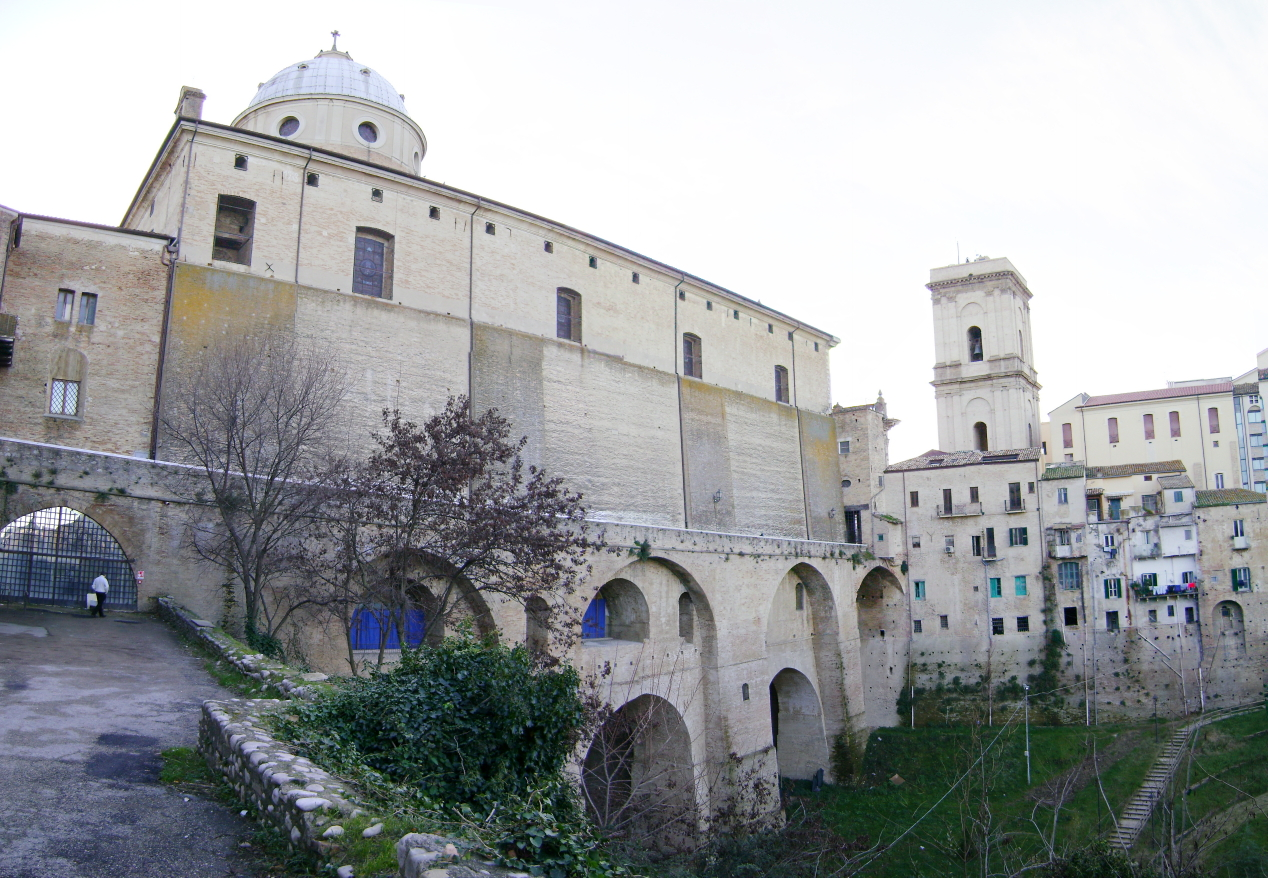
The cathedral with the bridge of Diocletian under it

The unique characteristic of this church, reflected in its name, lies in the fact that it is built on top of three arches of a Roman bridge, built by Diocletian.

The citizens of Lanciano decided to erect a church in honour of the Madonna in 1389. It was initially called Oratorio di Maria Santissima del Ponte (Oratory of the Most Holy Mary of the Bridge) and then was later renamed to Santa Maria delle Grazie (Saint Mary of the Graces).

In 1088, during reconstruction work on the bridge after an earthquake, a statue of the Madonna and Child was discovered and named the Madonna of the bridge. The statue was in fact an 8th-century Byzantine icon, probably hidden in an arch of the bridge during the iconoclasm.

The church was built in the 14th century. At the beginning of the 17th century the campanile was built by Tommaso Sotardo of Milan. In 1785, some work was done to enrich the interior.

It was entirely rebuilt in the 18th century, under the direction of the engineer Eugenio Micchitelli, who demolished the pre-existing church. The facade of the new church was begun in 1819, but the upper part of it was never completed.

The church received further renovation work between 1942 and 1943.

== Description ==
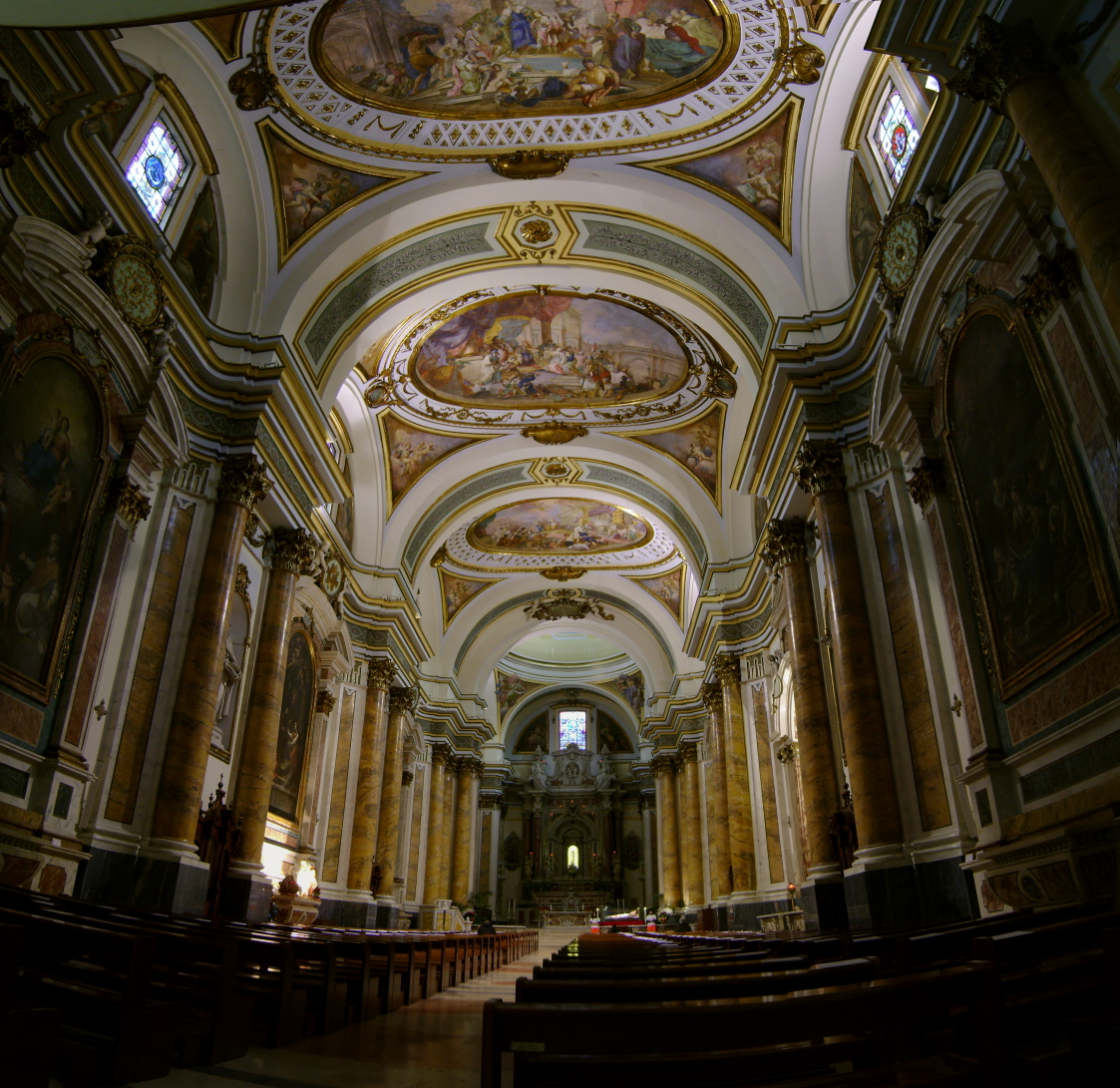
Interior

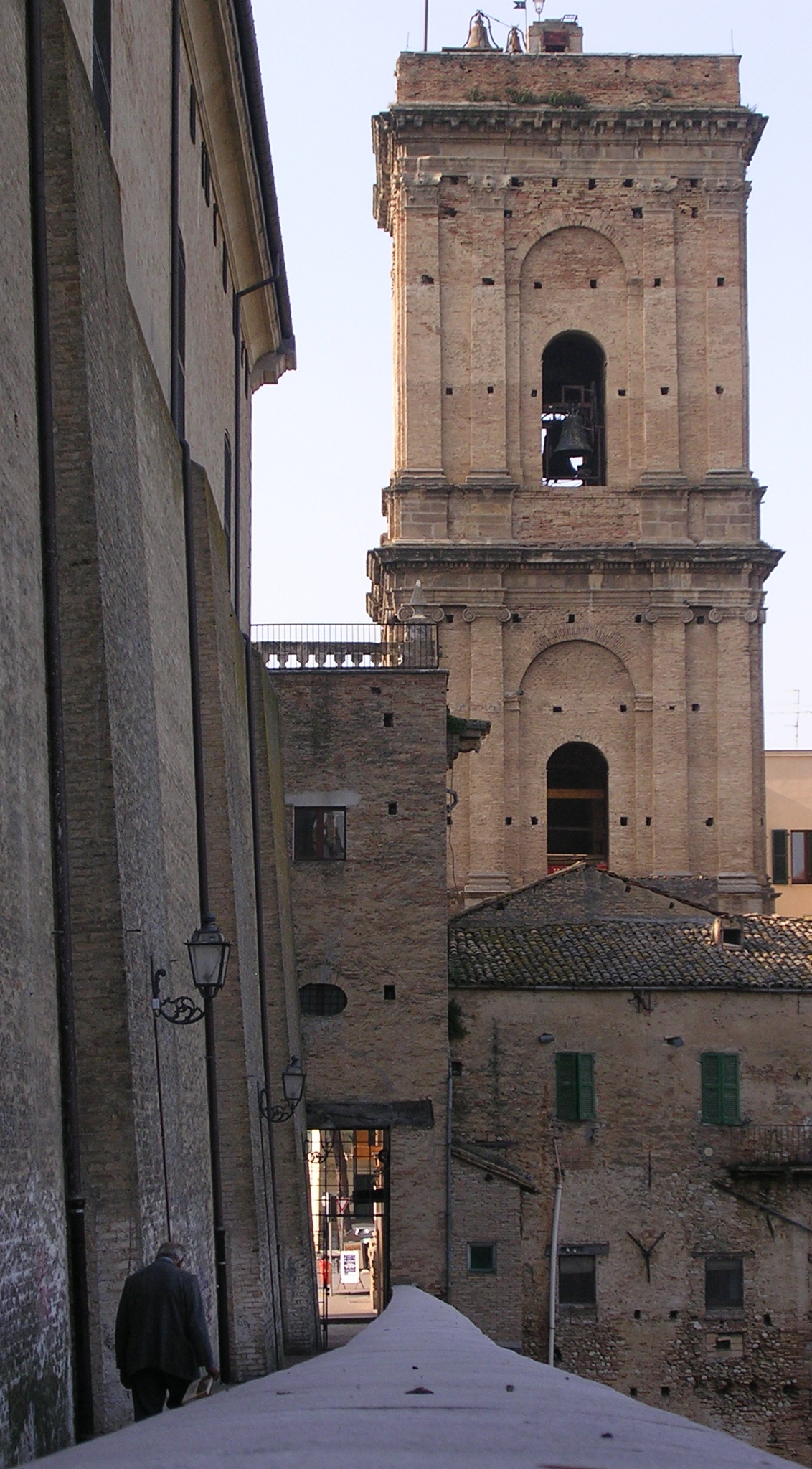
Campanile seen from the Diocletianic Bridge on the right side of the cathedral

Inside, there is a single nave. There are pilasters along all the walls with Corinthian capitals, which support the vault. There are Neoclassical altars along the side walls, with paintings. Three of these also have niches with statues of saints. In a niche at the base of the chancel is the polychrome terracotta statue of the Madonna del Ponte.

The facade has a projecting portion formed by the portico which is capped by the balustrade. The exterior walls are made of brick.

The campanile is separate from the rest of the structure and has three levels.

On the right side of the nave is the chapel of the Holy Sacrament. The frescoes of its vaults are the work of the Neapolitan painter Giacinto Diano.

Recent restorations, following an earthquake in 1985, have adapted the chancel to fit the norms prescribed by Vatican II, with the new altar consecrated in 1996 and the construction of an ambon (with a marble eagle by the Lanciano sculptor Vito Pancella) in 1997, together with a baptismal font in 1999, near the chancel.

== Traditions ==
The campanile of the basilica has a small cannon on the summit, which is fired at noon every day to signal the hour. There is also a bell which rings in a burst every morning at 8:00 and at 12:00, which is called Squillina ("prawnlet"). The Squillina, which rings with the daily firing of the cannon at noon, also sounds in the evening on 23 December, the day of the Lanciano prawn festival, a pre-Christmas tradition in which the children are shut in their family houses, kiss their fathers' hands as a sign of respect and receive gifts.

== See also ==
- Roman Catholic Archdiocese of Lanciano-Ortona
