= Diocese of Bertinoro =

The Italian Catholic diocese of Bertinoro existed from 1360 to 1986. In that year it was merged with the diocese of Forlì to create the diocese of Forlì-Bertinoro.

== History ==
Bertinoro is in Romagna, in the province of Forlì-Cesena. According to legend, about the year 303 St. Illuminata, a virgin of Ravenna, took refuge here, but was martyred.

Up to 1360 Bertinoro was a town within the territory of the Bishop of Forlimpopoli. In that year, however, Cardinal Albornoz being commander of the troops of Pope Gregory IX, Forlimpopoli was destroyed, when Albornoz took the city by force, obliged the inhabitants to abandon it, and razed it to the ground. The episcopal see was then transferred to Bertinoro, and the bishop, Roberto dei Resinelli, an Augustinian, took with him relics of St. Rufillus. In 1377 Roberto was succeeded by Bishop Teobaldo, who received from Pope Urban VI the civil authority over Bertinoro and Cesena, and fought against the bodies of mercenaries recruited by the Antipope Clement VII, by whom he was made prisoner.

Bishop Ventura degli Abati was highly praised by Pope Martin V for his learning and piety. Tommaso Caselli, a Dominican (1544), was an able theologian; Gianandrea Caligari (1580), formerly nuncio to Poland, restored the Cathedral of Santa Caterina. Giovanni della Robbia (1624), a Dominican, established at Forlimpopoli the Accademia degli Infiammati.

In 1803 Pope Pius VII suppressed the diocese of Bertinoro; it was re-established in 1817. From 1824 to 1859 it was united to the diocese of Sarsina.

The bishops' seat was Bertinoro Cathedral.

== Bishops of Bertinoro ==
=== to 1600 ===
- Robertus de Bretevilla (1365–c. 1378)
- Theobaldus Pelissiae (1378–c.1395)
- Ursillus de Afflitto (1395–1404)
- Marco de Teramo (15 Dec 1404 – 29 Dec 1418 Appointed, Bishop of Sarno)
- Marcus, O.S.M. (1418–1429)
- Ventura degli Abbati (13 Apr 1429 – 1477 Died)
- Giuliano Maffei (Matteis), O.F.M. (24 Jan 1477 – 1505)
- Giovanni Ruffo de Theodoli (18 Apr 1505 – 6 Nov 1511 Appointed, Archbishop of Cosenza)
- Bartolomeo Muratini (17 Oct 1511 – Jan 1512 Resigned)
- Angelo Petrucci (28 Jan 1512 – 1514 Died)
- Raffaello Petrucci (1519–1520) Administrator
- Pietro Petrucci (14 Mar 1520 – 1537)
- Benedetto Conversini (15 Oct 1537 – 1540)
- Girolamo Verallo (20 Aug 1540 – 14 Nov 1541 Appointed, Bishop of Caserta)
- Cornelio Musso, O.F.M. Conv. (14 Nov 1541 – 27 Oct 1544 Appointed, Bishop of Bitonto)
- Tommaso Caselli, O.P. (27 Oct 1544 – 7 May 1548 Appointed, Bishop of Oppido Mamertina)
- Lodovico Vanino de Theodoli, C.R.L. (7 May 1548 – 10 Jan 1563 Died)
- Egidio Falcetta de Cingulo (30 Jan 1563 – 1 Jul 1564 Died)
- Agostino Folignatti (Molignatus) (28 Jul 1564 – 1579 Died)
- Giovanni Andrea Caligari (14 Oct 1579 – 19 Jan 1613 Died)

=== since 1600 ===
- Innocenzo Massimi (20 May 1613 – 1 Jul 1624 Appointed, Bishop of Catania)
- Giovanni della Robbia (bishop), O.P. (29 Jul 1624 – 25 Oct 1641)
- Isidoro della Robbia, O.S.B. (10 Mar 1642 – Nov 1656)
- Ottaviano Prati (21 Apr 1659 – Aug 1659)
- Guido Bentivoglio (bishop), C.R. (16 Feb 1660 – 1 Feb 1676)
- Vincenzo Cavalli (Gaballi) (23 Mar 1676 – Jun 1701)
- Giovanni Battista Missiroli (8 Aug 1701 – Jan 1734)
- Gaetano Calvani (24 Mar 1734 – 19 Sep 1747 Resigned)
- Francesco Maria Colombani (20 Nov 1747 – 27 Mar 1788 Died)
- Giacomo Boschi (15 Sep 1788 – 1807)
- Federico Bencivenni, O.F.M. Cap. (14 Apr 1817 – 19 Nov 1829)
- Giambattista Guerra (15 Mar 1830 – 1857)
- Pietro Buffetti (3 Aug 1857 – 12 Jan 1874)
- Camillo Ruggeri (4 May 1874 – 3 Jul 1882 Appointed, Bishop of Fano)
- Lodovico Leonardi (3 Jul 1882 – Jun 1898)
- Federico Polloni (28 Nov 1898 – 10 Mar 1924 Died)
- Antonio Scarante (18 Dec 1924 – 30 Jun 1930 Appointed, Bishop of Faenza)
- Francesco Gardini (9 May 1931 – 31 Jan 1950 Died)
- Mario Bondini (16 Mar 1950 – 28 Jan 1959 Died)
- Giuseppe Bonacini (16 May 1959 – 14 Nov 1969 Died)
- Giovanni Proni (10 Mar 1970 – 30 Sep 1986 Appointed, Bishop of Forli-Bertinoro)

== Books ==
=== Episcopal lists ===
- Gams, Pius Bonifatius (1873). Series episcoporum Ecclesiae catholicae: quotquot innotuerunt a beato Petro apostolo. Ratisbon: Typis et Sumptibus Georgii Josephi Manz. pp. 724–725. (in Latin)
- Eubel, Conradus, ed. (1913). Hierarchia catholica. Vol. Tomus 1 (second ed.). Münster: Libreria Regensbergiana. (in Latin)
- Eubel, Conradus, ed. (1914). Hierarchia catholica. Vol. Tomus 2 (second ed.). Münster: Libreria Regensbergiana. (in Latin)
- Gulik, Guilelmus (1923). Eubel, Conradus (ed.). Hierarchia catholica. Vol. Tomus 3 (second ed.). Münster: Libreria Regensbergiana. (in Latin)
- Gauchat, Patritius (Patrice) (1935). Hierarchia catholica. Vol. Tomus IV (1592-1667). Münster: Libraria Regensbergiana. (in Latin)
- Ritzler, Remigius; Sefrin, Pirminus (1952). Hierarchia catholica medii et recentis aevi V (1667-1730). Patavii: Messagero di S. Antonio.
- Ritzler, Remigius; Sefrin, Pirminus (1958). Hierarchia catholica medii et recentis aevi. Vol. Tomus VI (1730-1799). Patavii: Messagero di S. Antonio. (in Latin)
- Ritzler, Remigius; Sefrin, Pirminus (1968). Hierarchia Catholica medii et recentioris aevi sive summorum pontificum, S. R. E. cardinalium, ecclesiarum antistitum series... A pontificatu Pii PP. VII (1800) usque ad pontificatum Gregorii PP. XVI (1846) (in Latin). Vol. VII. Monasterii: Libr. Regensburgiana.
- Remigius Ritzler; Pirminus Sefrin (1978). Hierarchia catholica Medii et recentioris aevi... A Pontificatu PII PP. IX (1846) usque ad Pontificatum Leonis PP. XIII (1903) (in Latin). Vol. VIII. Il Messaggero di S. Antonio.
- Pięta, Zenon (2002). Hierarchia catholica medii et recentioris aevi... A pontificatu Pii PP. X (1903) usque ad pontificatum Benedictii PP. XV (1922) (in Latin). Vol. IX. Padua: Messagero di San Antonio. ISBN 978-88-250-1000-8.

=== Studies ===
- Cappelletti, Giuseppei (1844). Le chiese d'Italia (in Italian). Vol. secondo. Venezia: Antonelli. pp. 437–480.
- Kehr, Paul Fridolin (1906). Italia Pontificia Vol. V: Aemilia, sive Provincia Ravennas. Berlin: Weidmann. (in Latin).
- Ughelli, Ferdinando; Coleti, Niccolò (1717). Italia sacra sive De Episcopis Italiae, et insularum adjacentium (in Italian). Vol. Tomus secundus (2). Venice: apud Sebastianum Coleti. pp. 589–618.
