= Bertinoro =

- Comune
- Comune di Bertinoro
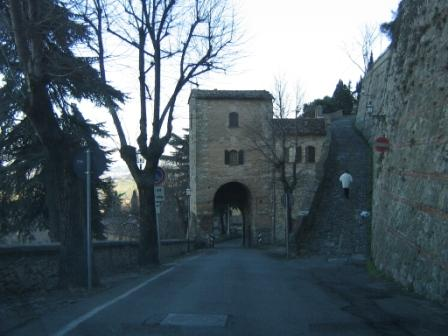
- Walls and gate in Bertinoro

- Location within Italy Location within Emilia-Romagna
- Coordinates: 44°09′N 12°08′E
- Country: Italy
- Region: Emilia-Romagna
- Province: Forlì-Cesena (FC)
- Frazioni: Bracciano, Capocolle, Collinello, Fratta Terme, Ospedaletto, Panighina, Polenta, San Pietro in Guardiano, Santa Croce, Santa Maria Nuova Spallicci

Government
  - Mayor: Filippo Scogli

Area
  - Total: 56 km^{2} (22 sq mi)
- Elevation: 220 m (720 ft)

Population (30 April 2017)
  - Total: 10,941
  - Density: 200/km^{2} (510/sq mi)
- Demonym: Bertinoresi
- Time zone: UTC+1 (CET)
  - Summer (DST): UTC+2 (CEST)
- Postal code: 47032
- Dialing code: 0543
- Patron saint: St. Catherine of Alexandria
- Saint day: 25 November
- Website: Official website

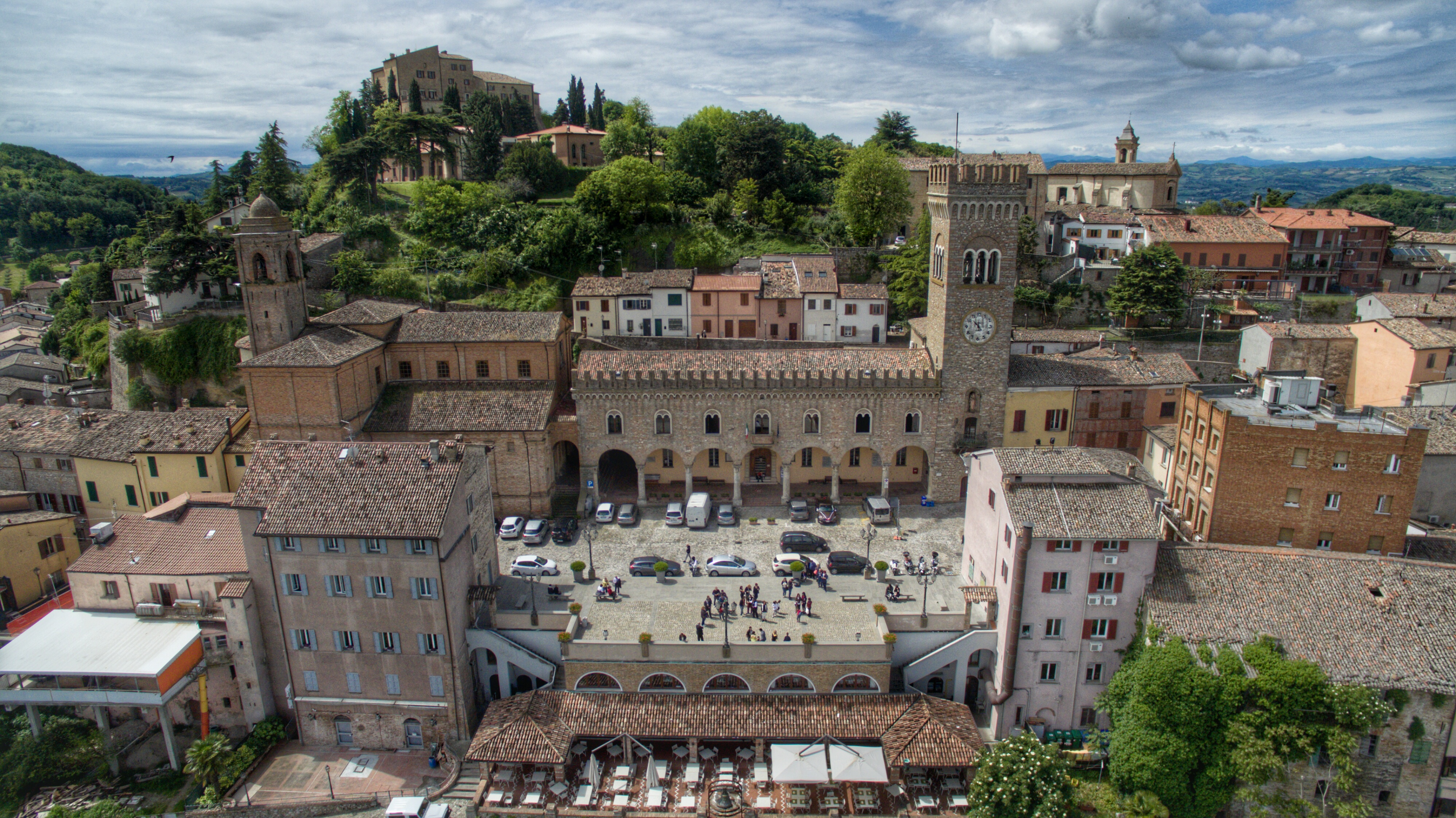
Panorama of Bertinoro

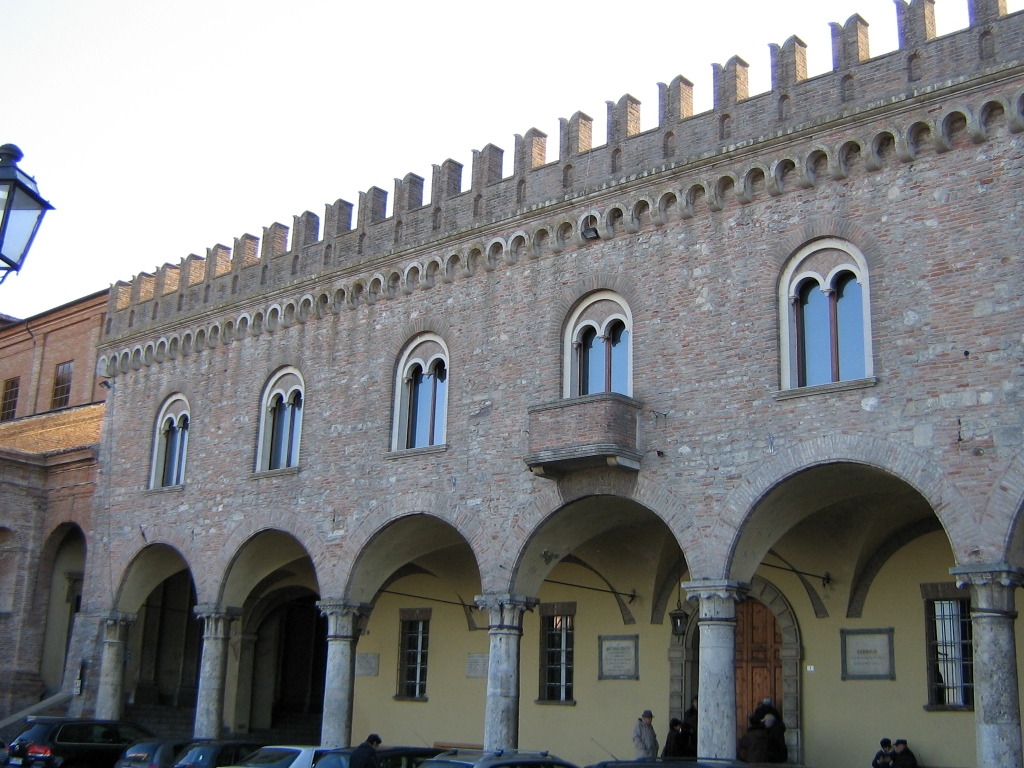
Palazzo Ordelaffi

Bertinoro (Romagnol: Bartnòra) is a comune (municipality) in the province of Forlì-Cesena, in the Italian region of Emilia-Romagna. It is located on hill Mount Cesubeo, in Romagna, a few kilometers from the Via Emilia.

== History ==
There are remains of a settlement dating from the Iron Age, next to the frazione of Casticciano. As for Bertinoro itself, it was probably a strongpoint on the Roman road connecting Forlì to Rimini. Later, during the barbaric invasions, it was moved to the current location.

In 1177 the castle, already well developed and known as Castrum Cesubeum, housed the emperor Frederick Barbarossa. The named changed to Castrum Brittinori during the reign of Otto III, becoming seat of the countship.

== Main sights ==
- The rocca (castle), built around the year 1000. It is now home to the Museum of Holy Arts and a conference center of the University of Bologna.
- The Communal Palace, built in 1306 by Pino I Ordelaffi
- Colonna delle Anelle ("Column of the Ring" or "Column of hospitality"). It is a column in white stone with 12 rings erected in 1300 by the noble families of the town to show their hospitality. Each one of the rings corresponded to one family, when the foreigners arrived in the town and tied the horse bridles to a ring they selected their host.
- The Cathedral, built in the 16th century
- The pieve (church) of San Donato, in the frazione of Polenta. It became famous as the object of a poem by Giosuè Carducci. It has maintained parts of the original late 9th century edifice.

== Culture ==
Bertinoro is home to a "Hospitality Festival". Held in the first weekend of September, it encompasses an entire night of music, dances and events (between Friday and Saturday), some historic reenactments, and the final hospitality rite (Sunday late morning).

In this ceremony anyone can be hosted for meal by a family in the town simply taking one of the envelopes tied to the rings of the Hospitality column (which inside has the name of the hosting family).

== People ==
- Obadiah ben Abraham, also known as "The Bartenura" after the town, or "RAV-רע"ב", an abbreviation for "Rabbi Ovadia [of] Bartenura", was a 15th-century rabbi and commentator of the Mishnah.

== International relations ==
=== Twin towns — sister cities ===
Bertinoro is twinned with:

- Ale, Sweden
- Kaufungen, Germany
- Budești, Moldova
