= Giovanni Dominico Tomati =

Most Reverend Giovanni Dominico Tomati
- Titular Bishop of Cyrene
- Church: Catholic Church
- In office: 1700–1711
- Predecessor: Stefano Giuseppe Menatti
- Successor: Prospero Marefoschi

Orders
- Consecration: 13 April 1700 by Bandino Panciatici

Personal details
- Born: 27 June 1636 Caravonica, Italy
- Died: 23 March 1711 (aged 74)

Giovanni Dominico Tomati (27 June 1636 – 23 March 1711) was a Roman Catholic prelate who served as Titular Bishop of Cyrene (1700–1711).

== Biography ==
Giovanni Dominico Tomati was born in Caravonica, Italy on 27 June 1636. On 30 March 1700, he was appointed during the papacy of Pope Innocent XII as Titular Bishop of Cyrene. On 13 April 1700, he was consecrated bishop by Bandino Panciatici, Cardinal-Priest of San Pancrazio, with Giovanni Battista Capilupi, Bishop of Polignano, and Domenico Belisario de Bellis, Bishop of Molfetta, serving as co-consecrators. He served as Titular Bishop of Cyrene until his death on 23 March 1711.

== Episcopal succession ==
Episcopal succession of Giovanni Dominico Tomati

While bishop, he was the principal co-consecrator of:

- Tommaso Antonio Scotti, Archbishop of Dubrovnik (1701);
- Francesco Frosini, Bishop of Pistoia e Prato (1701); and
- Franz Ferdinand von Kuenburg; Bishop of Ljubljana (1701).

Catholic Church titles
Preceded by Stefano Giuseppe Menatti	Titular Bishop of Cyrene; 1700–1711	Succeeded by Prospero Marefoschi
