= Catacomb of the Two Felixes =

The Catacomb of the Two Felixes (Italian: catacomba dei due Felici) is a catacomb on the ancient via Aurelia in Rome, run by the Pontifical Commission for Sacred Archaeology. Its ancient name is unknown but the Notitia ecclesiarum urbis Romae states of a catacomb near those of San Pancrazio and Santi Processo e Martiniano (but further from central Rome than them, which neighbour each other) "and you ascend above and you will reach the church; there Saint[s] Martianus and Processus rest under the earth, and saint Lucina, virgin and martyr, in the upper part; then you will reach by the same via [Aurelia] the two martyred holy pontiffs both named Felix".

== Description ==
Silvagni defines this catacomb and its difficult identification as "a historical-archaeological enigma". The problem is particularly a hagiographic one, since there are three not two major Felixes in early Christianity - pope Felix I (known to be buried in the catacomb of Callixtus), Antipope Felix II and Pope Felix III (who died in 492, an era when Christians were not usually buried in catacombs). Archaeologist Agostino Amore argues that there is no historical basis for the Notitia's assertion that two popes named Felix were buried on the via Aurelia, whilst Kirsch's theory is that this catacomb initially only housed the tomb of the antipope but that a later legend united him with the Felix actually buried in the catacomb of Callixtus, giving rise to the name of this catacomb.
