= Panciatici =

Panciatici is a surname. Notable people with the surname include:

- Bandino Panciatici (1629–1718), Italian Roman Catholic cardinal (1690–1718)
- Jacques Panciatici (1948–2024), French rally driver
- Nelson Panciatici (born 1988), French professional racing driver
