= Carlo Cutillo =

Italian prelate of the Catholic Church

Most Reverend Carlo Cutillo
- Bishop of Minori
- Church: Catholic Church
- Diocese: Diocese of Minori
- In office: 1694–1704
- Predecessor: Gennaro Crespino
- Successor: Francesco Morgioni

Orders
- Consecration: 19 September 1694

Personal details
- Born: 8 July 1626 Montefusco, Italy
- Died: December 1704 (age 78) Minori, Italy

Carlo Cutillo, O.S.B. (1626–1704) was a Roman Catholic prelate who served as Bishop of Minori (1694–1704).

== Biography ==
Carlo Cutillo was born in Montefusco, Italy on 8 July 1626, and ordained as a priest in the Order of Saint Benedict. On 13 September 1694, he was appointed during the papacy of Pope Innocent XII, as Bishop of Minori. On 19 September 1694, he was consecrated as bishop by Bandino Panciatici, Cardinal-Priest of San Pancrazio, with Stefano Giuseppe Menatti, Bishop of Como, and Pierre Lambert Ledrou, Titular Bishop of Porphyreon, with serving as co-consecrators. He served as Bishop of Minori until his death, in December 1704.

== External links and additional sources ==
- Cheney, David M. "Diocese of Minori". Catholic-Hierarchy.org. (for Chronology of Bishops) ^{[self-published]}
- Chow, Gabriel. "Titular Episcopal See of Minori (Italy)". GCatholic.org. (for Chronology of Bishops) ^{[self-published]}

Catholic Church titles
Preceded by Gennaro Crespino	Bishop of Minori; 1694–1704	Succeeded by Francesco Morgioni
