= Giovanni Battista Capilupi =

Most Reverend Giovanni Battista Capilupi
- Bishop of Polignano
- Church: Catholic Church
- Diocese: Diocese of Polignano
- In office: 1694–1716
- Predecessor: Ignatius Fiumi
- Successor: Pietro Antonio Pini

Orders
- Ordination: 5 March 1678
- Consecration: 19 September 1694 by Bandino Panciatici

Personal details
- Born: 27 December 1653 Matera, Italy
- Died: 3 May 1716 (age 62) Polignano, Italy

Giovanni Battista Capilupi (27 December, 1643 – 3 May, 1716) was a Roman Catholic prelate who served as Bishop of Polignano (1694–1716).

== Biography ==
Giovanni Battista Capilupi was born in Matera, Italy on 27 December 1653. He was and ordained deacon on 21 March 1676 and ordained a priest on 5 March 1678. On 13 September 1694, he was appointed during the papacy of Pope Innocent XII as Bishop of Polignano. On 19 September 1694, he was consecrated bishop by Bandino Panciatici, Cardinal-Priest of San Pancrazio, with Stefano Giuseppe Menatti, Bishop of Como, and Pierre Lambert Ledrou, Titular Bishop of Porphyreon, serving as co-consecrators. He served as Bishop of Polignano until his death on 3 May 1716.

While bishop, he was the principal co-consecrator of Giovanni Dominico Tomati, Titular Bishop of Cyrene (1700).

Catholic Church titles
Preceded by Ignatius Fiumi	Bishop of Polignano; 1694–1716	Succeeded by Pietro Antonio Pini
