= John Roche (bishop) =

Irish Roman Catholic prelate

Most Reverend John Roche
- Bishop of Ferns
- Church: Catholic Church
- In office: 1624–1636
- Predecessor: Daniel Drihin
- Successor: Nicolas Franch

Orders
- Consecration: 25 April 1627 by Guido Bentivoglio d'Aragona

Personal details
- Born: 1584
- Died: 9 April 1636 (age 52) Ferns, County Wexford, Ireland

John Roche (1584 – 9 April 1636) was a Roman Catholic prelate who served as Bishop of Ferns (1624–1636).

== Biography ==
John Roche was born in 1584. On 29 April 1624, he was appointed during the papacy of Pope Urban VIII as Bishop of Ferns. On 25 April 1627, he was consecrated bishop by Guido Bentivoglio d'Aragona, Cardinal-Priest of Santa Maria del Popolo, with Francesco Nappi (bishop), Bishop of Polignano, and Ranuccio Scotti Douglas, Bishop of Borgo San Donnino, serving as co-consecrators. He served as Bishop of Ferns until his death on 9 April 1636. His seal matrix, probably engraved in Rome in 1624, was sold at auction on 5 October 2021 for £240. It is circular with the inscription 'IO : ROCHUS : EPUS : FERNEN' and features a centre shield of three fish, surmounted by cardinal’s hat, without handle.

Catholic Church titles
Preceded by Daniel Drihin	Bishop of Ferns; 1624–1636	Succeeded by Nicolas Franch
