= Catacomb of Saints Processus and Martinian =

The Catacomb of Saints Processus and Martinianus is one of the catacombs of Rome. Sited on the via Aurelia, no ancient remains have been conclusively identified as being it.

== Sources ==
The Martyrologium Hieronymianum mentions saints Martinian and Processus (who according to a legendary 6th century 'passio' were saint Peter's gaolers) as being martyred on 31 May, 1 July or 2 July - the third of these dates is thought the most probable, since it is the one also given in other ancient liturgical sources. The Notitia ecclesiarum urbis Romae refers to their being buried near the Catacomb of San Pancrazio - indeed, after a visit to that catacomb, the Notitias author made a pilgrimage to that now named after Processus and Martinianus without interrupting or deviating from his route, meaning they were very close to each other.

== Theories ==
Enrico Stevenson and Enrico Josi argue that this catacomb is to be identified with the funerary galleries under the villa Doria Pamphilj near the catacomb of San Pancrazio. Other more recent scholars place the catacomb topographically closer to St Peter's Basilica, in the Janiculum area, where several underground burial chambers were found from the late 19th century onwards, particularly in the area around the Church of Sant'Onofrio al Gianicolo.

In 1898, during the construction of a monastery of Sister Dorothea on the salita di Sant'Onofrio, a gallery with clear indications of Christian iconography were discovered. Four years later other galleries were discovered and destroyed in the construction of a building adjacent to that monastery. Il Marucchi, who studied these galleries before their destruction, theorised that they were an extensive Christian cemetery which branched off towards the Vatican Basilica. In 1980 Margherita Cecchelli theorised that these galleries formed part of the lost catacomb of Saints Processus and Martinianus, which extended from its most important nucleus under the Collegio Urbaniano.

Works to build parking under the Janiculum in 1998-1999 revealed more ancient underground structures, again destroyed. During the same period other discoveries were made under the monastery of Sister Dorothea. A definite identification based on iconographical, topographical and archaeological finds is still far off, especially given the difficulties in preserving and studying the archaeological finds in the area for a longer period of time.

== Bibliography (in Italian) ==
- De Santis L. - Biamonte G., Le catacombe di Roma, Newton & Compton Editori, Roma 1997, pp. 139-140
- Cecchelli Trinci M., La chiesa di S. Agata in Fundo Lardario e il cimitero dei SS. Processo e Martiniano. Note sulla topografia delle due Aurelie, in Quaderni dell'Istituto di Archeologia e Storia Antica della libera Università abruzzese degli Studi di Chieti, 1 (1980) 85-112
- Nestori A., Un cimitero cristiano anonimo nella villa Doria Pamphilj a Roma, in Rivista di Archeologia Cristiana, 35 (1959) 5-47
