= Francesco Nappi (bishop) =

Most Reverend Francesco Nappi
- Bishop of Polignano
- Church: Catholic Church
- Diocese: Diocese of Polignano
- In office: 1619–1628
- Predecessor: Giovanni Maria Guanzelli
- Successor: Girolamo Parisani

Orders
- Consecration: 8 December 1619 by Giulio Savelli

Personal details
- Born: 1584
- Died: November 1628 (aged 43–44) Polignano, Italy

Francesco Nappi (1584 – November 1628) was a Roman Catholic prelate who served as Bishop of Polignano (1619–1628).

== Biography ==
Francesco Nappi was born in 1584. On 20 November 1619, he was appointed Bishop of Polignano by Pope Paul V. On 8 December 1619, he was consecrated bishop by Giulio Savelli, Bishop of Ancona e Numana, with Marinus Bizzius, Archbishop of Bar, and Giulio Sansedoni, Bishop Emeritus of Grosseto, serving as co-consecrators. He served as Bishop of Polignano until his death in November 1628.

== Episcopal succession ==
While bishop, he was the principal co-consecrator of:

- John Roche, Bishop of Ferns (1627);
- Giovanni Paolo Savio, Bishop of Šibenik (1627);
- Octavius Rivarola, Bishop of Ajaccio (1627);
- Francesco Maria Brancaccio, Bishop of Capaccio (1627);
- Annibale Mascambruno, Bishop of Castellammare di Stabia (1627);
- Luis Jiménez, Bishop of Ugento (1627);
- Giacomo Marenco, Bishop of Saluzzo (1627).

Catholic Church titles
Preceded by Giovanni Maria Guanzelli	Bishop of Polignano; 1619–1628	Succeeded by Girolamo Parisani
