= Diocese of Ruvo =

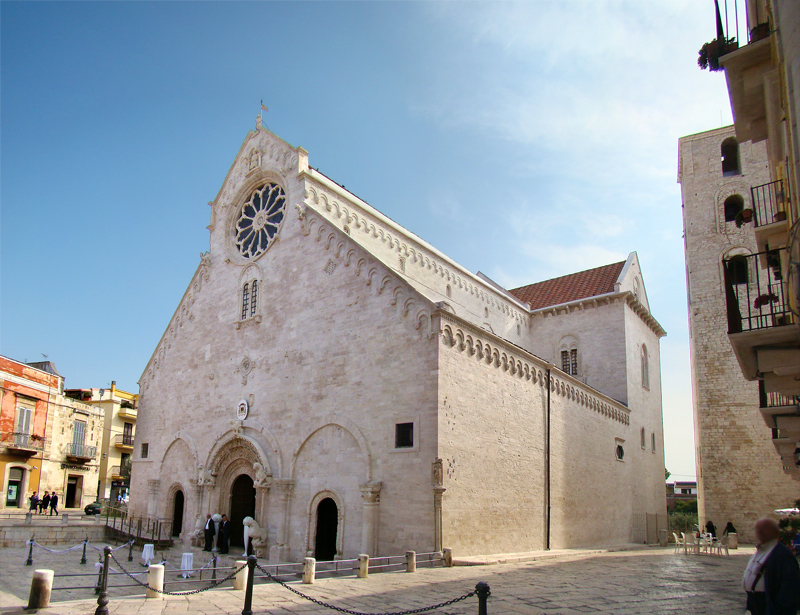
Co-cathedral of Santa Maria Assunta

The diocese of Ruvo was a Roman Catholic ecclesiastical territory in Apulia, southern Italy, which existed until 1986, when it was united into the diocese of Molfetta-Ruvo-Giovinazzo-Terlizzi. From 1818 to 1982, it was united with the diocese of Bitonto, as the diocese of Ruvo and Bitonto.

== History ==
According to legend, Saint Peter, the apostle and friend of Jesus Christ, appointed the first bishop of Ruvo, Cletus, in 44; he later became pope (c. 79 – 91). Ughelli records a Procopius, Bishop of Ruvo, of unknown date, though he doubts his existence. Bishop Joannes is attributed to the year 493, but his connection with Ruvo is doubtful; he occurs in the legends of Canosa and Siponto.

In June 1025, Pope John XIX confirmed for Archbishop Bisantius of Canosa (Bari) the possessions and territories of his diocese, which included the suffragan bishops of: Canosa, Bari, Medunio, Giovenazzo, Molfetta, Ruvo, Trani, Canne, Minervino Murge, Acquaviva, Monte Meloni, Lavellano, Cisterna, Vitalbe, Salpi, Conversano, and Polignano.

=== Reorganization of the Kingdom of the Two Sicilies, 1818 ===
Following the extinction of the Napoleonic Kingdom of Italy, the Congress of Vienna authorized the restoration of the Papal States and the Kingdom of The Two Sicilies (Naples). A concordat was finally signed on 16 February 1818, and ratified by Pius VII on 25 February 1818. Ferdinand issued the concordat as a law on 21 March 1818. The right of the king to nominate the candidate for a vacant bishopric was recognized, as in the Concordat of 1741, subject to papal confirmation (preconisation).

On 27 June 1818, Pius VII issued the bull De Ulteriore, in which he reestablished the metropolitan archbishopric of Bari, and assigned as suffragan (subordinate) dioceses: Bitonto, Ruvo, Conversana. The diocese of Bitunto, however, was united to the diocese of Ruvo, æque principaliter, that is, one and the same bishop would govern the two independent dioceses.

On 4 September 1982, Father Antonio Bello, the pastor of the church of the Nativity of the Virgin Mary in Tricase, was appointed Bishop of Molfetta, Giovenazzo and Terlizzi. The appointment did not include the dioceses of Ruvo and Bitonto, which were formerly held along with Molfetta æque principaliter, thereby apparently reviving the two dioceses. On 30 September 1982, however, Bishop-elect Bello was appointed bishop of Ruvo, thereby restoring Ruvo to the governance of the bishop of Molfetta. On the same day, 30 September 1982, the diocese of Bitonto was assigned to Archbishop Mariano Magrassi of Bari, thus separating Bitonto from Molfetta.

=== Diocesan Reorganization ===
Following the Second Vatican Council, and in accordance with the norms laid out in the council's decree, Christus Dominus chapter 40, Pope Paul VI ordered a reorganization of the ecclesiastical provinces in southern Italy. He ordered consultations among the members of the Congregation of Bishops in the Vatican Curia, the Italian Bishops Conference, and the various dioceses concerned.

On 18 February 1984, the Vatican and the Italian State signed a new and revised concordat. Based on the revisions, a set of Normae was issued on 15 November 1984, which was accompanied in the next year, on 3 June 1985, by enabling legislation. According to the agreement, the practice of having one bishop govern two separate dioceses at the same time, aeque personaliter, was abolished. The Vatican continued consultations which had begun under Pope John XXIII for the merging of small dioceses, especially those with personnel and financial problems, into one combined diocese.

On 30 September 1986, Pope John Paul II ordered that the dioceses of Molfetta, Giovenazza, Terlizzi and Ruvo be merged into one diocese with one bishop, with the Latin title Dioecesis Melphictensis-Rubensis-Iuvenacensis-Terlitiensis. The seat of the diocese was to be in Molfetta, whose cathedral was to serve as the cathedral of the merged diocese. The cathedrals in Giovenazza, Terlizzi, and Ruvo were to have the honorary titles of "co-cathedral"; the Chapters were each to be a Capitulum Concathedralis. There was to be only one diocesan Tribunal, in Molfetta, and likewise one seminary, one College of Consultors, and one Priests' Council. The territory of the new diocese was to include the territory of the suppressed dioceses. The new diocese was a suffragan of the archdiocese of Bari-Bitonto.

=== Chapter and cathedral ===
Ruvo di Puglia has a late Apulian Romanesque cathedral dating to the 11th-12th centuries. Outside of the city are the ruins of a more ancient church, possibly of the late fourth or early fifth century, which has been called a cathedral.

The cathedral of Ruvo, dedicated to the Taking Up of the Body of the Virgin Mary into Heaven, had no canons at all, though it was administered by four dignities (the Archdeacon, the Archpriest, the senior Primicerius, and the junior Primicerius) and a staff of more than forty priests, eleven deacons, and more than seventy subdeacons and clerics. There is no other church in the city except the cathedral.

The diocese of Ruvo had no seminary. It shared the facilities of the diocese of Bitonto.

== Bishops ==
=== Diocese of Ruvo ===
Latin Name: Rubensis
Erected: 6th Century
Metropolitan: Archdiocese of Bari (-Canosa)

==== to 1414 ====
...
[Joachim (c. 1009 – 1049)]
[Abiatarus (c. 1049)]
...

- Guibertus (attested 1071 – 1082)

...

- Daniel (attested 1177 – 1183)

...

- [Anonymous] (1207)

...

- [Anonymous] (1215)

...

- [Anonymous] (1225, 1226)

...
Sede vacante (1239)
...

- Mandictius (attested 1258 – 1266)

...

- Franc[ - - -]
- Paulus de Nolles (attested 1241)
- Petrus Gabrielli
- Nicolaus Gabrielli
- Major (attested 1323)
- Johannes (attested 1327)
- Guillelmus (attested 1330)
- Nicolaus Perrese (1336 – 1343)
- Johannes de Ariano (1344 – 1348)
- Stephanus, O.Min. (1349 – ? )
- Antonius (1390 – 1398)
- Sixtus Coletti, O.Min. (1399) Roman Obedience
- Domenico Orsi (1399 – c. 1414)

==== 1414 to 1833 ====
- Simon da Brundisio, O.Min. (1418 – 1431)
- Pietro de la Rosa (1432 –1443)
- Cristoforo de S. Petro, O.Min. (1443 – 1451)
- Pietro Santorio (1452 – 1469)
- Antonio Coletti (1469 – 1480)
- Antonio de Roccha (1480 –1486)
- Francesco Spalutius (1486 – 1512)
- Giulio de Mirto (1512–1520 Resigned)
- Giovanni Francesco de Mirto (19 Mar 1520 – 1578 Resigned)
- Orazio de Mirto (9 Apr 1578 – 1589 Deposed)
- Gaspare Pasquali, O.F.M. Conv. (3 Jul 1589 – 1604)
- Giuseppe Saluzzo (1604 – 1620)
- Cristoforo Memmolo, C.R. (29 Mar 1621 – May 1646 Died)
- Marco Romano, C.R. (19 Nov 1646 – Sep 1649 Died)
- Ferdinando Apicello (2 May 1650 – 28 Aug 1656 Appointed, Bishop of Larino)
- Giovanni Battista Volpi (16 Oct 1656 – 1663 Died)
- Gabriele Tontoli (24 Sep 1663 – Nov 1665 Died)
- Giuseppe Caro (11 Jan 1666 – Sep 1671 Died)
- Sebastiano d'Alessandro, O. Carm. (15 Jan 1672 – 29 Dec 1672 Died)
- Domenico Sorrentino (1673 – 1676)
- Domenico Gallesi (1676 – 1679)
- Giovan Donato Giannoni Alitto (1680 – 1698)
- Francesco Morgioni (1698 – 1705)
- Bartolomeo Gambadoro (1705 – 1730)
- Giulio de' Torri (1731 – 1759)
- Pietrangelo Ruggieri (1759 – 1807)

Sede vacante (1807 – 1819)

=== Diocese of Ruvo e Bitonto ===
Latin Name: Rubensis et Bituntinus
United: 27 June 1818 with the Diocese of Bitonto

- Vincenzo Maria Manieri, O.F.M. Conv. (1819 – 1833)
- Niccola Marone (15 Feb 1838 – 18 Jun 1853 Resigned)
- Vincenzo Materozzi (12 Sep 1853 – 8 Jul 1884)
- Luigi Bruno (8 Jul 1884 Succeeded – 10 Jan 1893)
- Tommaso de Stefano (Stefani) (19 Jan 1893 – 1898)
- Pasquale Berardi (24 Mar 1898 – 1921)
- Placido Ferniani (7 Apr 1922 – 22 May 1925)
- Domenico del Buono (24 Jul 1925 – 16 Jan 1929)
- Andrea Taccone (27 Aug 1929 – 30 Apr 1949 Resigned)
- Aurelio Marena (16 Mar 1950 – 21 Nov 1978 Retired)
- Antonio Bello (30 Sep 1982 – 30 Sep 1986)

Appointed, Bishop of Molfetta-Ruvo-Giovinazzo-Terlizzi)

30 September 1986: Diocese of Ruvo suppressed; territory united with Diocese of Molfetta-Giovinazzo-Terlizzi

== Bibliography ==
=== Episcopal lists ===
- Eubel, Conradus, ed. (1913). Hierarchia catholica, Tomus 1 (second ed.). Münster: Libreria Regensbergiana. (in Latin)
- Eubel, Conradus, ed. (1914). Hierarchia catholica, Tomus 2 (second ed.). Münster: Libreria Regensbergiana.
- Eubel, Conradus; Gulik, Guilelmus (1923). Hierarchia catholica, Tomus 3 (second ed.). Münster: Libreria Regensbergiana.
- Gams, Pius Bonifatius (1873). Series episcoporum Ecclesiae catholicae: quotquot innotuerunt a beato Petro apostolo (in Latin). Ratisbon: Typis et Sumptibus Georgii Josephi Manz. pp. 918–919.
- Gauchat, Patritius (Patrice) (1935). Hierarchia catholica IV (1592-1667). Münster: Libraria Regensbergiana.
- Ritzler, Remigius; Sefrin, Pirminus (1952). Hierarchia catholica medii et recentis aevi V (1667-1730). Patavii: Messagero di S. Antonio.
- Ritzler, Remigius; Sefrin, Pirminus (1958). Hierarchia catholica medii et recentis aevi VI (1730-1799). Patavii: Messagero di S. Antonio.
- Ritzler, Remigius; Sefrin, Pirminus (1968). Hierarchia Catholica medii et recentioris aevi (in Latin). Vol. VII (1800–1846). Monasterii: Libreria Regensburgiana.

=== Studies ===
- Bernardi, Francesco (2012). "Una strage evitata. Ruvo e la pestilenza del 1656." (in Italian) Luce e vita. Documentazione Semestrale – Ufficiale per gli atti di Curia per la Diocesi di Molfetta-Ruvo-Giovinazzo-Terlizzi. Molfetta 2010/2.
- Cappelletti, Giuseppe (1870). Le chiese d'Italia dalla loro origine sino ai nostri giorni (in Italian). Vol. vigesimoprimo (21). Venezia: Antonelli. pp. 35–39.
- D'Avino, Vincenzio (1848). Cenni storici sulle chiese arcivescovili, vescovili, e prelatizie (nullius) del regno delle due Sicilie (in Italian). Naples: dalle stampe di Ranucci. pp. 592–593.
- Fenicia, Salvatore (1857), Monografia di Ruvo di Magna Grecia. (in Italian). Napoli: S. Piscopo 1857.
- Kamp, Norbert (1975). Kirche und Monarchie im staufischen Königreich Sizilien: I. Prosopographische Grundlegung, Bistumer und Bistümer und Bischöfe des Konigreichs 1194–1266: 2. Apulien und Calabrien München: Wilhelm Fink 1975. pp. 652–655.
- Kehr, Paulus Fridolin (1962). Italia pontificia. Regesta pontificum Romanorum. Vol. IX: Samnia – Apulia – Lucania. Berlin: Weidmann. (in Latin). pp. 349–350.
- Lanzoni, Francesco (1927). Le diocesi d'Italia dalle origini al principio del secolo VII (an. 604) (in Italian). Rome: Biblioteca Apostolica Vaticana.
- Pellegrini, V. (1980). Ruvo: Diocesi e Vescovi (in Italian). Molfetta: Mezzina 1980.
- Ricci, Vito (2018). Ruvo Medievale. La città e gli uomini, il castello e i feudatari dai Normanni agli Aragonesi. (in Italian). Pegasus Edizioni/Centro Studi Cultura e Memoria Ruvo di Puglia, 2018. ISBN 978-88-6271-085-5
- Ughelli, Ferdinando; Coleti, Niccolò (1721). Italia sacra, sive De Episcopis Italiae (in Latin). Vol. Tomus septimus (VII). Venice: apud Sebastianum Coleti. pp. 762–768.
