= Giovanni Battista Gentile =

Most Reverend Giovanni Battista Gentile
- Bishop of Ajaccio
- Church: Catholic Church
- Diocese: Diocese of Ajaccio
- In office: 1694–1695
- Predecessor: Giovanni Paolo Inurea
- Successor: François Marie Sacco

Orders
- Consecration: 19 September 1694 by Bandino Panciatici

Personal details
- Born: 1658 Genoa, Italy
- Died: 2 September 1695 (age 37) Ajaccio, France

Giovanni Battista Gentile, O.S.B. (1658–1695) was a Roman Catholic prelate who served as Bishop of Ajaccio (1694–1695).

== Biography ==
Giovanni Battista Gentile was born in Genoa, Italy in 1658 and ordained a priest in the Order of Saint Benedict. On 13 September 1694, he was appointed during the papacy of Pope Innocent XII as Bishop of Ajaccio. On 19 September 1694, he was consecrated bishop by Bandino Panciatici, Cardinal-Priest of San Pancrazio, with Stefano Giuseppe Menatti, Bishop of Como, and Pierre Lambert Ledrou, Titular Bishop of Porphyreon, serving as co-consecrators. He served as Bishop of Ajaccio until his death on 2 September 1695.

Catholic Church titles
Preceded by Giovanni Paolo Inurea	Bishop of Ajaccio; 1694–1695	Succeeded by François Marie Sacco
