= Pierre Lambert Ledrou =

Most Reverend Pierre Lambert Ledrou
- Titular Bishop of Porphyreon
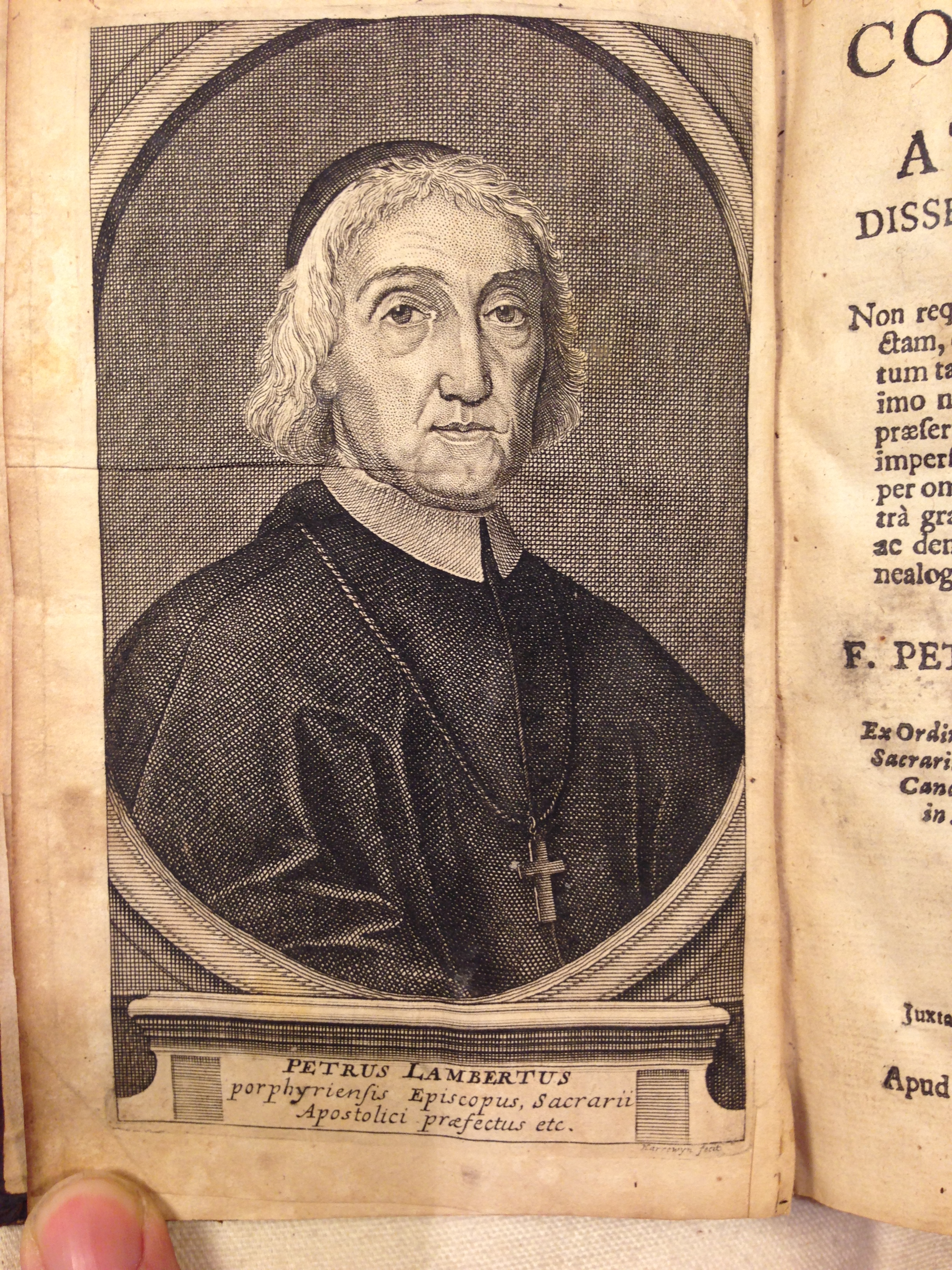
- Pierre-Lambert Ledrou (etching, 1707)
- Church: Catholic Church
- In office: 1641–1721
- Predecessor: Giuseppe Eusanio
- Successor: Agostino Nicola degl'Abbati Olivieri

Orders
- Ordination: 12 April 1664
- Consecration: 21 December 1692 by Fabrizio Spada

Personal details
- Born: 1641 Huy, Belgium
- Died: 6 May 1721 (age 80)

Pierre Lambert Ledrou, O.E.S.A. (1641 – 6 May 1721) was a Roman Catholic prelate who served as Titular Bishop of Porphyreon (1692–1721).

== Biography ==
Pierre Lambert Ledrou was born in Huy, Belgium in 1641 and ordained a priest in the Order of Hermits of St. Augustine on 12 April 1664. On 25 June 1692, he was appointed during the papacy of Pope Innocent XII as Titular Bishop of Porphyreon. On 21 December 1692, he was consecrated bishop by Fabrizio Spada, Cardinal-Priest of San Crisogono, with Michelangelo Mattei, Titular Archbishop of Hadrianopolis in Haemimonto, and Giovanni Battista Visconti Aicardi, Bishop of Novara, serving as co-consecrators. He served as Titular Bishop of Porphyreon until his death on 6 May 1721.

== Episcopal succession ==
While bishop, he was the principal co-consecrator of:

- Carlo Cutillo, Bishop of Minori (1694);
- Giovanni Battista Capilupi, Bishop of Polignano (1694);
- Giovanni Battista Gentile, Bishop of Ajaccio (1694);
- Girolamo Grimaldi, Titular Archbishop of Edessa in Osrhoëne (1713); and
- Jean-Ernest de Löwenstein-Wertheim, Bishop of Tournai (1714).

== External links and additional sources ==
- Media related to Pierre-Lambert Ledrou at Wikimedia Commons
- Cheney, David M. "Porphyreon (Titular See)". Catholic-Hierarchy.org. (for Chronology of Bishops) ^{[self-published]}
- Chow, Gabriel. "Titular Episcopal See of Porphyreon (Israel)". GCatholic.org. (for Chronology of Bishops) ^{[self-published]}

Catholic Church titles
Preceded by Giuseppe Eusanio	Titular Bishop of Porphyreon; 1692–1721	Succeeded by Agostino Nicola degl'Abbati Olivieri
