= Pietro Gaddi =

18th-century Roman Catholic bishop

Most Reverend Pietro Gaddi
- Bishop of Spoleto
- Church: Catholic Church
- Diocese: Diocese of Spoleto
- In office: 1695–1710
- Predecessor: Marcello Durazzo
- Successor: Carlo Giacinto Lascaris

Orders
- Consecration: 6 Mar 1695 by Bandino Panciatici

Personal details
- Born: 3 November 1644 Forlì, Italy
- Died: Sep 1710 (age 76)

Pietro Gaddi (1644–1710) was a Roman Catholic prelate who served as Bishop of Spoleto (1695–1710).

== Biography ==
Pietro Gaddi was born on 3 Nov 1644 in Forlì, Italy. On 7 Feb 1695, he was appointed during the papacy of Pope Innocent XII as Bishop of Spoleto. On 6 Mar 1695, he was consecrated bishop by Bandino Panciatici, Cardinal-Priest of San Pancrazio, with Sperello Sperelli, Bishop of Terni, and Giovanni Giuseppe Camuzzi, Bishop of Orvieto, serving as co-consecrators. He served as Bishop of Spoleto until his death in Sep 1710.

While bishop, he was the principal co-consecrator of Domenico Folgori, Titular Archbishop of Nazareth (1695).

== External links and additional sources ==
- Cheney, David M. "Archdiocese of Spoleto-Norcia". Catholic-Hierarchy.org. (for Chronology of Bishops) ^{[self-published]}
- Chow, Gabriel. "Archdiocese of Spoleto-Norcia". GCatholic.org. (Chronology of Bishops) ^{[self-published]}

Catholic Church titles
Preceded by Marcello Durazzo	Bishop of Spoleto; 1695–1710	Succeeded by Carlo Giacinto Lascaris
