= Pietro Paolo Gerardi =

17th and 18th-century Italian Catholic bishop

Most Reverend Pietro Paolo Gerardi
- Bishop of Anagni
- Church: Catholic Church
- Diocese: Diocese of Anagni
- In office: 1696–1708
- Predecessor: Bernardino Masseri
- Successor: Giovanni Battista Bassi

Orders
- Consecration: 3 June 1696 by Bandino Panciatici

Personal details
- Born: 8 March 1633 Rome, Italy
- Died: 31 May 1708 (age 75) Anagni, Italy

Pietro Paolo Gerardi (1633–1708) was a Roman Catholic prelate who served as Bishop of Anagni (1696–1708).

He was born in Rome, Italy. He was ordained a deacon on 15 April 1696 and ordained a priest on 23 April 1696. On 21 May 1696, he was appointed during the papacy of Pope Innocent XII as Bishop of Anagni. On 3 June 1696, he was consecrated bishop by Bandino Panciatici, Cardinal-Priest of San Pancrazio, with Prospero Bottini, Titular Archbishop of Myra, and Sperello Sperelli, Bishop of Terni, serving as co-consecrators. He served as Bishop of Anagni until his death on 31 May 1708.

While bishop, Gerardi was the principal co-consecrator of Giovanbattista Carafa, Bishop of Nocera de' Pagani (1700).

== External links and additional sources ==
- Cheney, David M. "Diocese of Anagni-Alatri". Catholic-Hierarchy.org. (for Chronology of Bishops) ^{[self-published]}
- Chow, Gabriel. "Diocese of Anagni-Alatri (Italy)". GCatholic.org. (for Chronology of Bishops) ^{[self-published]}

Catholic Church titles
Preceded by Bernardino Masseri	Bishop of Anagni; 1696–1708	Succeeded by Giovanni Battista Bassi
