= Giovanni Matteo Marchetti =

17th and 18th-century Italian Catholic bishop

Most Reverend Giovanni Matteo Marchetti
- Bishop of Arezzo
- Church: Catholic Church
- Diocese: Diocese of Arezzo
- In office: 1691–1704
- Predecessor: Giuseppe Ottavio Attavanti
- Successor: Benedetto Falconcini

Orders
- Consecration: 30 December 1691 by Bandino Panciatici

Personal details
- Born: 18 February 1647 Pistoia, Italy
- Died: September 1704 (age 57) Arezzo, Italy

Giovanni Matteo Marchetti (1647–1704) was a Roman Catholic prelate who served as Bishop of Arezzo (1691–1704).

== Biography ==
Giovanni Matteo Marchetti was born in Pistoia, Italy on 18 February 1647. On 19 December 1691, he was appointed during the papacy of Pope Innocent XII as Bishop of Arezzo. On 30 December 1691, he was consecrated bishop by Bandino Panciatici, Cardinal-Priest of San Pancrazio, with Prospero Bottini, Titular Archbishop of Myra, and Stefano Giuseppe Menatti, Titular Bishop of Cyrene, serving as co-consecrators. He served as Bishop of Arezzo until his death in September 1704.

Catholic Church titles
Preceded by Giuseppe Ottavio Attavanti	Bishop of Arezzo; 1691–1704	Succeeded by Benedetto Falconcini
