= Bandino Panciatici =

Italian Roman Catholic prelate (1629–1718)

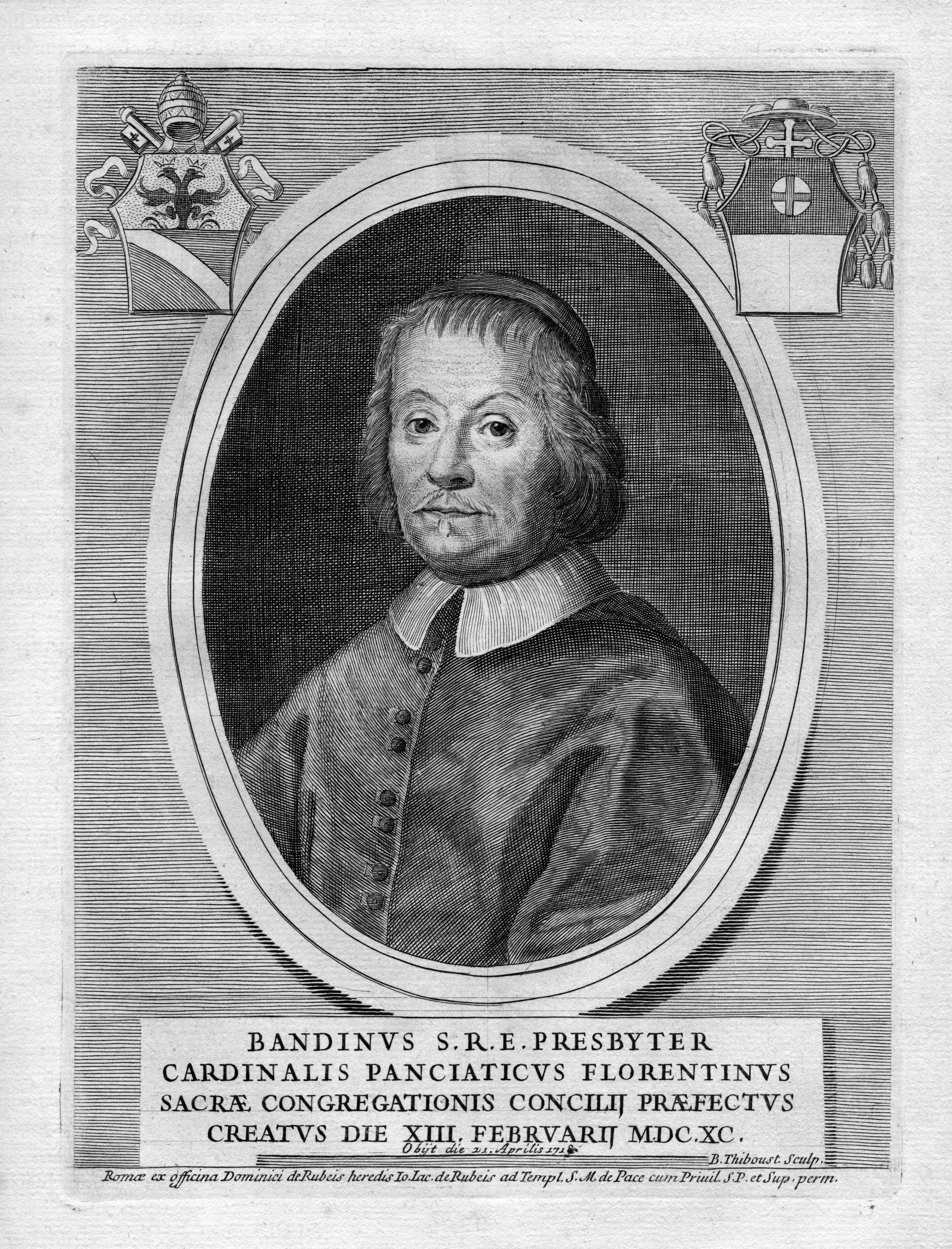
Bandino Panciatici

Bandino Panciatici (10 July 1629 – 21 April 1718) was a Roman Catholic cardinal from 1690 to 1718.

== Biography ==
Bandino Panciatici was born in Florence on 10 July 1629. He came from a Pistoian noble family, and was a relative of Pope Clement IX. He was educated at the University of Pisa, receiving a doctorate in law.

After university, he traveled to Rome and practiced law with Giambattista De Luca. When his relative became Pope Clement IX in 1667, he entered the papal household. He became secondo collaterale of the Roman Curia. A short time after that, he became lieutenant of the auditor of the Apostolic Camera. When Pope Clement X was elected in 1670, he resigned to respect the laws of justice (non mancare ai doveri della giustizia), returning to Florence. In 1678, he was recalled to Rome by Pope Innocent XI to become secretary of the S.C. of the Apostolic Visit and of the State of Regulars. He then became S.C. of Bishops and Regulars in 1686. He later became Referendary of the Tribunals of the Apostolic Signature of Justice and of Grace.

On 7 October 1689 he became prodatary of the Apostolic Dataria. On 14 October 1689 he became Titular Patriarch of Jerusalem, with dispensation for not having yet received Holy Orders. He was consecrated as a bishop in Rome by Cardinal Gasparo Carpegna on 21 December 1689. On 25 January 1690 he was named Assistant at the Pontifical Throne.

The pope made him a cardinal priest at the consistory of 13 February 1690. On 10 April 1690 he received the red hat and the titular church of San Tommaso in Parione. He participated in the papal conclave of 1691 that elected Pope Innocent XII. He was confirmed as prodatary by the new pope on 14 July 1690. He opted for the titular church of San Pancrazio on 8 August 1691. He became Camerlengo of the Sacred College of Cardinals in 1699, holding that office until 3 February 1700. He participated in the papal conclave of 1700 that elected Pope Clement XI. The new pope offered him the position of Cardinal Secretary of State, but he declined because of his age. He did, however, agree to serve as prefect of the S.C. of the Tridentine Council, assuming that office on 4 December 1700. He exchanged his titular church for Santa Prassede on 19 February 1710.

He died at his residence, the Palazzo Bolognetti on 21 April 1718. He was initially buried in San Pancrazio, but later re-interred in his family's traditional burial place, the Basilica of Santa Maria Novella in Florence.

== Episcopal succession ==
While bishop, he was the principal consecrator of:

- Giovanni Matteo Marchetti, Bishop of Arezzo (1691);
- Sebastiano Perissi, Bishop of Nocera de' Pagani (1692);
- Carlo Cutillo, Bishop of Minori (1694);
- Giovanni Battista Capilupi, Bishop of Polignano (1694);
- Giovanni Battista Gentile, Bishop of Ajaccio (1694);
- Pietro Gaddi, Bishop of Spoleto (1695);
- Giuseppe Cei (bishop), Bishop of Cortona (1695);
- Domenico Belisario de Bellis, Bishop of Molfetta (1696);
- Nicolò Nardini, Bishop of Acquapendente (1696);
- Antonio Grassi, Bishop of Chioggia (1696);
- Pietro Paolo Gerardi, Bishop of Anagni (1696);
- Vincenzo Maria de Rossi, Bishop of Penne e Atri (1696);
- Lorenzo Fabri, Bishop of Fossombrone (1697);
- Giovanni Fontana, Bishop of Cesena (1697);
- Giuseppe Antonio Bertodano, Bishop of Vercelli (1697);
- Andrea Deodati, Archbishop of Rossano (1697);
- Giuseppe Rodoero, Bishop of Acerra (1697);
- Giambattista Isnardi de Castello, Bishop of Mondovi (1697);
- Domenico Pacifico, Bishop of Teano (1698);
- Bisanzio Fili, Bishop of Oppido Mamertina (1698);
- Pietro Spínola, Bishop of Ajaccio (1698);
- Philippus Albini, Bishop of Sant'Agata de' Goti (1699);
- Giovanni Dominico Tomati, Titular Bishop of Cyrene (1700);
- Ulisse Giuseppe Gozzadini, Titular Archbishop of Teodosia (1700);
- Tommaso Antonio Scotti, Archbishop of Dubrovnik (1701);
- Francesco Frosini, Bishop of Pistoia e Prato (1701);
- Orazio Maria Panciatichi, Bishop of Fiesole (1703);
- Benedetto Falconcini, Bishop of Arezzo (1704);

and the principal co-consecrator of:

- Pietro Priuli, Bishop of Bergamo (1708).

== External links and additional sources ==
- Cheney, David M. "Patriarchate of Jerusalem {Gerusalemme}". Catholic-Hierarchy.org. (for Chronology of Bishops) ^{[self-published]}
- Chow, Gabriel. "Patriarchal See of Jerusalem (Israel)". GCatholic.org. (for Chronology of Bishops) ^{[self-published]}

Catholic Church titles
Preceded by Egidio Colonna	Titular Patriarch of Jerusalem; 1689—1690	Succeeded by Niccolo Pietro Bargellini
Preceded by Gregorio Giovanni Gasparo Barbarigo	Cardinal-Priest of San Tommaso in Parione; 1690—1691	Succeeded by Innico Caracciolo (iuniore)
Preceded by Antonio Pignatelli del Rastrello	Cardinal-Priest of San Pancrazio; 1691—1710	Succeeded by Damian Hugo Philipp von Schönborn Bushein
Preceded by Domenico Maria Corsi	Camerlengo of the Sacred College of Cardinals; 1699—1700	Succeeded by Giacomo Cantelmo
Preceded by Fabrizio Spada	Cardinal-Priest of Santa Prassede; 1710—1718	Succeeded by Francesco Barberini (iuniore)
