= Mario Marefoschi =

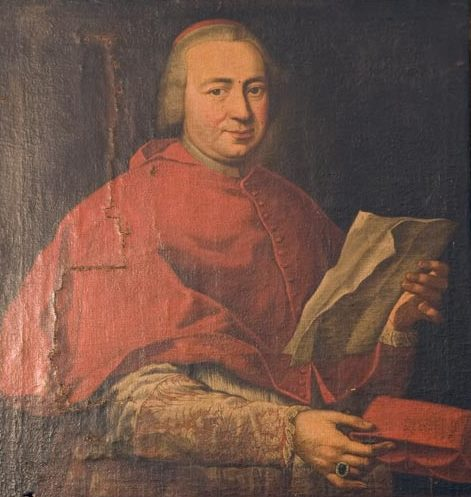
Portrait of Marefoschi

Mario Compagnoni Marefoschi (10 September 1714 – 23 December 1780) was a cardinal of the Roman Catholic Church.

He was born in the Palazzo Compagnoni Marefoschi in Macerata, Italy. Pope Clement XIV made him a cardinal in pectore on 29 January 1770 and announced he had done so on 10 September 1770. He was assigned the titular church of Sant'Agostino on 12 December 1770.

He was appointed Prefect of the Sacred Congregation of Rites and Archpriest of the Basilica of St. John Lateran in 1771 and held both posts until his death.

He participated in the papal conclave of 1774-1775 that elected Pope Pius VI.

Cardinal Prospero Marefoschi was his uncle.
