= Nicholas French =

Irish bishop & political activist (1604–1678)

The Most Reverend Nicholas French
- Roman Catholic Bishop of Ferns
- Appointed: 6 February 1645

Orders
- Ordination: by John Roche
- Consecration: 23 November 1645

Personal details
- Born: c. 1604 Wexford, County Wexford, Ireland
- Died: 23 August 1678 Ghent, Spanish Netherlands
- Buried: Saint Nicholas Church, Ghent

Nicholas French (c. 1604 – 23 August 1678) was an Irish bishop, political activist and pamphleteer. He was a key founder of the Irish Catholic Confederation, and served as the Roman Catholic Bishop of Ferns from 1645 until his death in 1678.

== Early life ==
Nicholas French was born in 1603 or 1604 in the town of Wexford, Ireland. His father John French came from a landed family in Ballytory, and his mother Christina Rossiter was from a family of similar status from Rathmacknee.

== Religious education ==
He was educated at St Anthony's College, Leuven. He lived in the Irish seminary there, the Collegium Pastorale.

He returned to Wexford after a few years, where he was ordained as a priest by then-Bishop of Ferns John Roche. Towards the end of 1630, French returned to Leuven to complete his studies. During this time he considered becoming a Cistercian.

== Irish Confederate Wars ==
In October 1641, the Irish Confederate Wars broke out after the Rebellion of Irish Catholics. By the end of 1641, County Wexford had hesitantly joined the Irish Rebellion, despite its deep-seated loyalist tendencies. As an accomplished member of the catholic clergy, French was marked out as a rebellion leader.

In March 1642, French and Anglo-Irish lawyer Sir Nicholas Plunkett, along with several other Catholic clerics and gentry, helped to organise the rebels into a more cohesive political movement - the Confederate Catholics of Ireland - with the intention of attaining freedom of religion and legal equality for Catholics and self-government for Ireland.

In May 1642, French was delegate to the meeting of the catholic clergy in Kilkenny. The Confederates established their capital there, and with the collapse of Royal authority as a result of the British Civil Wars, became the de facto government of Ireland between 1642 and 1649.

Flag of Confederate Ireland

On 6 February 1645, French was appointed Bishop of Ferns, and was consecrated on 23 November.

In 1646, a crisis emerged when Papal Nuncio Giovanni Battista Rinuccini opposed a settlement between the Confederates and the King's representative, James Butler, Marquess of Ormond. After many military reverses, French and Plunkett were sent as envoys to Rome to seek help, sailing from Wexford on 10 February 1648. Although the two men were positively greeted by the papacy, they didn't receive the help they were seeking. They left Rome empty-handed in late August, arriving in Ireland late November.

French and Plunkett assumed control of the Supreme Council and tried to promote a better peace treaty with the Royalists at the same time as a more vigorous prosecution of the war. A new treaty was signed with the Royalists in 1648 and French was prominent in trying to secure the widest possible support within the Confederation for it. However, the most hardline Catholic elements remained hostile to it. In any event, the Royalist/Confederate alliance lasted little more than a year - as they were crushed by an English Parliamentarian conquest of Ireland which began in 1649. The Parliamentarians were extremely hostile to Catholic clergy, executing them when they apprehended them.

French deemed it prudent to leave Ireland in 1651, and he lived the rest of his life in continental Europe. He acted as coadjutor to the archbishops of Santiago de Compostela and Paris, and to the Bishop of Ghent.

French, along with many Irish Catholics, was very disappointed with the treatment Irish Catholics received when the English monarchy was restored in 1660. Only a "favoured minority" of Irish Catholic Royalists were returned the land confiscated from them by the Parliamentarians under the Act of Settlement 1662 and the public practice of Catholicism remained illegal.

== Writings ==
In 1676, French published his attack on James Butler, entitled "The Unkinde Desertor of Loyall Men and True Friends," and shortly afterward "The Bleeding Iphigenia." The most important of his other pamphlets is the "Narrative of the Settlement and Sale of Ireland" (Louvain, 1668).

In collaboration with Plunkett and Bologna-based Irish professor Niall Ó Glacáin, French wrote eulogistic poems in Latin to Pope Innocent X, titled Regni Hiberniae ad Sanctissimi Innocenti Pont. Max. Pyramides Encomiasticae.

== Death and legacy ==
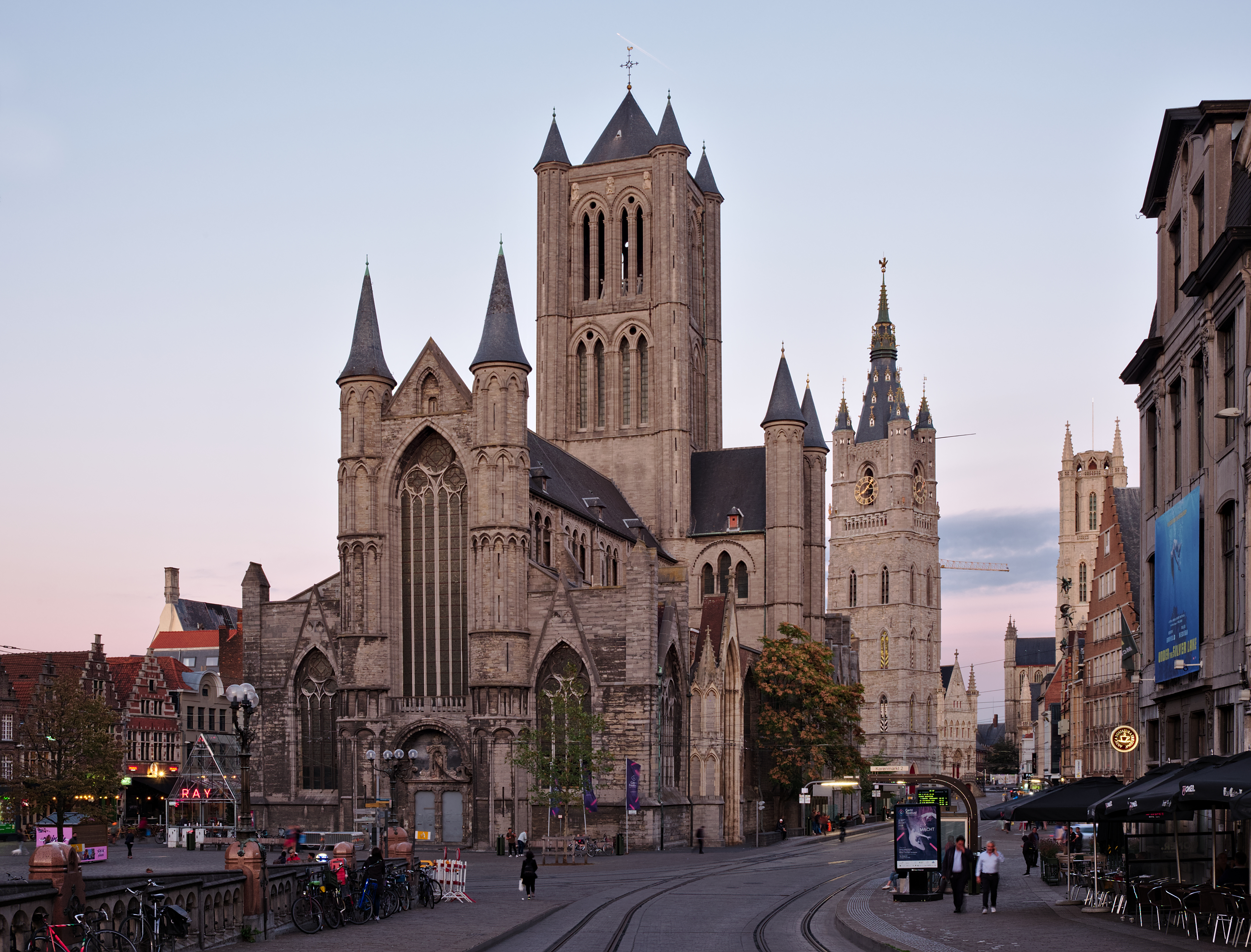
Saint Nicholas Church, French's burial place

French died in Ghent, Spanish Netherlands (present-day Belgium) on 23 August 1678. He is buried there in Saint Nicholas Church.

The Historical Works of Bishop French, comprising his three pamphlets and some letters, were published by SH Bindon at Dublin in 1846.

== Authorities ==
- Thomas D'Arcy McGee, Irish Writers of the 17th Century (Dublin, 1846)
- John Thomas Gilbert, Contemporary History of Affairs in Ireland, 1641-1652 (Dublin, 1879–1880)
- Thomas Carte, Life of James, Duke of Ormond (new ed., Oxford, 1851)
- "The Oxford Companion to Irish History", ed. S.J. Cannon, Oxford, 1999.
