= Giovan Donato Giannoni Alitto =

Most Reverend Giovan Donato Giannoni Alitto
- Bishop of Ruvo
- Church: Catholic Church
- Diocese: Diocese of Ruvo
- In office: 1680–1698
- Predecessor: Domenico Gallesi
- Successor: Francesco Morgioni

Orders
- Consecration: 17 March 1680 by Francesco Nerli (iuniore)

Personal details
- Born: 1636 Bitonto, Italy
- Died: 1698 (age 62) Ruvo, Italy

Giovan Donato Giannoni Alitto (1636–1698) was a Roman Catholic prelate who served as Bishop of Ruvo (1680–1698).

== Biography ==
Giovan Donato Giannoni Alitto was born in Bitonto, Italy in 1636. On 11 March 1680, he was appointed during the papacy of Pope Innocent XI as Bishop of Ruvo. On 17 March 1680, he was consecrated bishop by Francesco Nerli (iuniore), Archbishop of Florence, with Stefano Brancaccio, Bishop of Viterbo e Tuscania, and Lorenzo Trotti, Bishop of Pavia, serving as co-consecrators. He served as Bishop of Ruvo until his death in 1698.

== Episcopal succession ==
While bishop, he was the principal co-consecrator of:

- Carolus de Tilly, Bishop of Acerra (1692);
- Francesco Antonio Triveri, Bishop of Andria (1692); and
- Nicola Cirillo, Bishop of Nicastro (1692).

== External links and additional sources ==
- Cheney, David M. "Diocese of Ruvo". Catholic-Hierarchy.org. (for Chronology of Bishops) ^{[self-published]}
- Chow, Gabriel. "Diocese of Ruvo (Italy)". GCatholic.org. (for Chronology of Bishops) ^{[self-published]}

Catholic Church titles
Preceded by Domenico Gallesi	Bishop of Ruvo; 1680–1698	Succeeded by Francesco Morgioni
