= Stefano Giuseppe Menatti =

Italian Roman Catholic prelate

Most Reverend Stefano Giuseppe Menatti
- Bishop of Como
- Church: Catholic Church
- Diocese: Diocese of Como
- In office: 1694–1695
- Predecessor: Carlo Stefano Anastasio Ciceri
- Successor: Francesco Giambattista Bonesana

Orders
- Consecration: 3 November 1686 by Galeazzo Marescotti

Personal details
- Died: 5 August 1695 Como, Italy

Stefano Giuseppe Menatti (died 5 August 1695) was a Roman Catholic prelate who served as Bishop of Como (1694–1695).

== Biography ==
On 28 October 1686, he was appointed during the papacy of Pope Innocent XI as Titular Bishop of Cyrene. On 3 November 1686, he was consecrated bishop by Galeazzo Marescotti, Cardinal-Priest of Santi Quirico e Giulitta, with Gregorio Carducci, Bishop of Valva e Sulmona, and Pier Antonio Capobianco, Bishop Emeritus of Lacedonia, serving as co-consecrators. On 13 September 1694, he was appointed during the papacy of Pope Innocent XII as Bishop of Como. He served as Bishop of Como until his death on 5 August 1695.

== Episcopal succession ==
Episcopal succession of Stefano Giuseppe Menatti

He was the principal consecrator of:

- Giovanni Emblaviti, Bishop of Belcastro (1688);
- Francesco Verde, Bishop of Vico Equense (1688);
- Giovanni Battista Costa, Bishop of Sagone (1688);

and the principal co-consecrator of:

- Tommaso Caracciolo, Bishop of Gerace (1687);
- Giovanni Rasponi, Bishop of Forlì (1689);
- Domenico Diez de Aux, Bishop of Gerace (1689);
- Giovanni Matteo Marchetti, Bishop of Arezzo (1691);
- Marcello d'Aste, Titular Archbishop of Athenae (1692);
- Giovanni Battista Carrone, Bishop of Strongoli (1692);
- Pietro Martire Giustiniani, Archbishop of Naxos (1692);
- Federico Caccia, Titular Archbishop of Laodicea in Phrygia (1693);
- Leonardo Cassiani, Bishop of Teramo (1693);
- Giacinto Gaetano Chiurlia (Chyurlia), Bishop of Giovinazzo (1693);
- Francesco Protonobilissimo, Bishop of Trevico (1693);
- Fernando Manuel de Mejía, Bishop of Zamora (1693);
- Emilio Giacomo Cavaliere, Bishop of Troia (1694);
- Gerolamo Ventimiglia, Bishop of Lipari (1694);
- Alfonso Basilio Ghetaldo, Bishop of Stagno (1694);
- Carlo Cutillo, Bishop of Minori (1694);
- Giovanni Battista Capilupi, Bishop of Polignano (1694); and
- Giovanni Battista Gentile, Bishop of Ajaccio (1694).

Catholic Church titles
Preceded by Carlo Stefano Anastasio Ciceri	Bishop of Como; 1694–1695	Succeeded by Francesco Giambattista Bonesana
