= Palazzo Compagnoni Marefoschi, Macerata =

Coordinates: 43.3005°N 13.4550°E

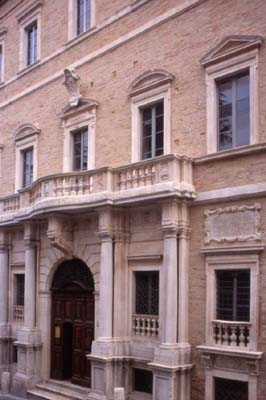
Entrance facade

The Palazzo Compagnoni Marefoschi is a Baroque-style aristocratic urban palace located on Via don Minzoni 11 in the center Macerata, region of the Marche, Italy. It rises diagonal to the Palazzo Buonaccorsi.

== History ==
Documents recall that the Compagnoni family by 1138 were inhabiting this site. By 1211, they had extended their holdings in this quarter of the city. The various buildings at this site were built over various centuries. In 1736, the branch of the family Compagnoni delle Lune built their own palace, commissioned from the architect Francesco Vici. A few decades later, the Compagnoni Marefoschi (arising from the Compagnoni delle Stelle) erected this present adjacent palace in the 18th-century.

From 1755 to 1771, the brothers Mario and Camillo Compagnoni Marefoschi, commissioned from Luigi Vanvitelli a major refurbishment, leading to the late-baroque or Rococo facade we see presently. Along the entrance stairway are numerous ancient Roman inscriptions derived from Hadrian's Villa at Tivoli.

The palace was the birthplace of cardinal Mario Compagnoni Marefoschi who spearheaded the suppression of the Jesuit order. In 1772, the palace hosted the marriage celebration for Louise of Stolberg-Gedern and Charles Edward Stuart, Count of Albany and pretender to the throne of England. The palace still houses descendants of the Compagnoni, and also is home to a School of Paralegal Training (Scuola di Specializzazione per le Professioni Legali).

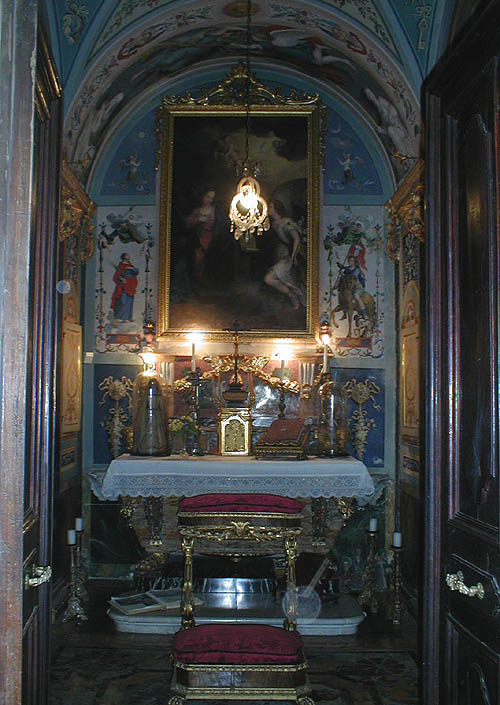
Interior of the private Compagnoni chapel

== Bibliography ==
- Adele Piergallini, Umberto Santori Compagnoni Marefoschi, Palazzo Compagnoni Marefoschi di Macerata, vol. 1 (collana "La famiglia Compagnoni Marefoschi: i Palazzi e la storia"), 2011.
