= Prospero Marefoschi =

- Cardinal
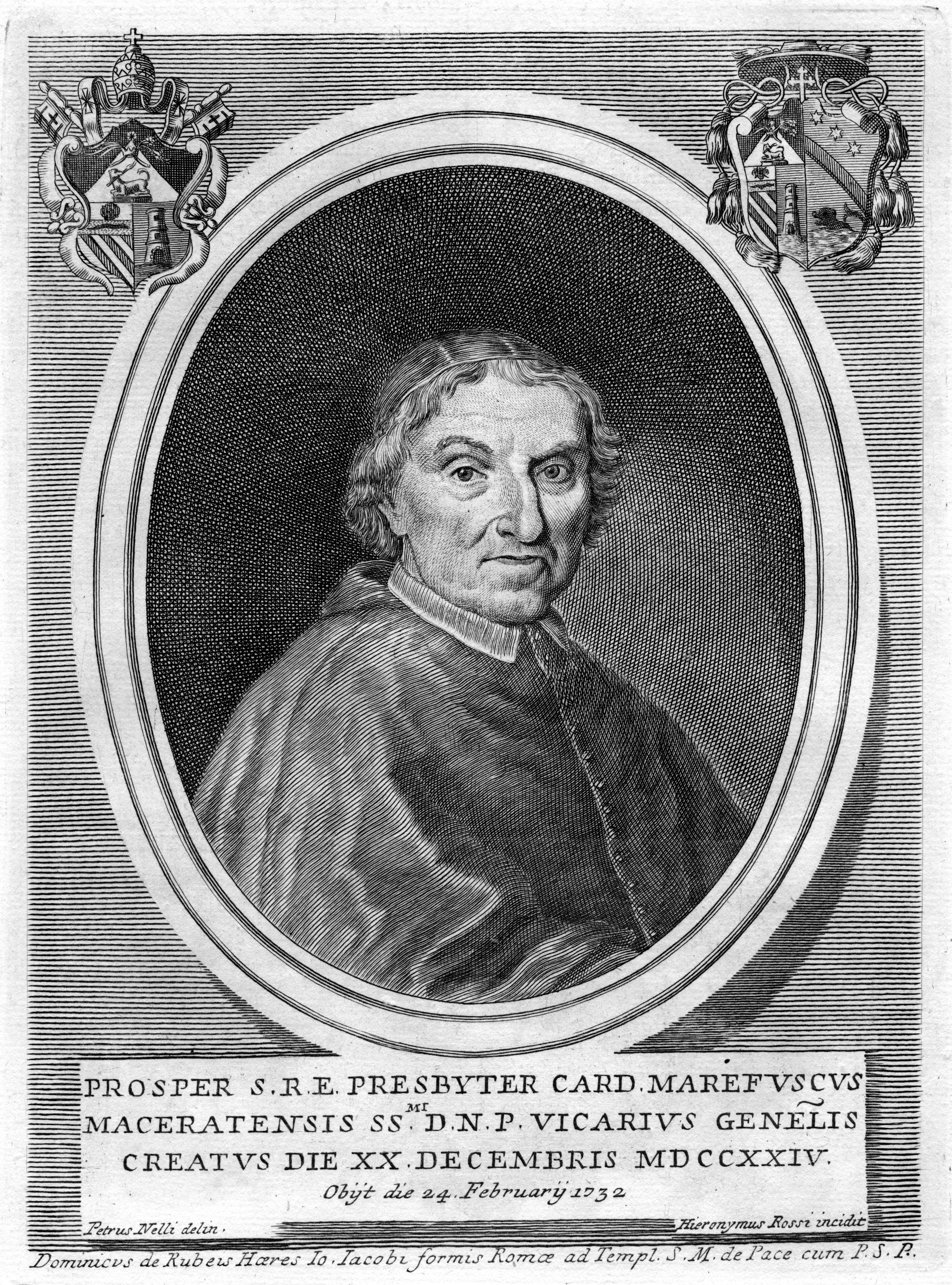
- Engraved portrait
- Installed: 29 January 1725

Personal details
- Born: 24 September 1653
- Died: 24 February 1732 (aged 78)

Prospero Marefoschi (24 September 1653 – 24 February 1732) was a cardinal of the Roman Catholic Church.

He was born in Montesanto, now part of Potenza Picena, in the region of Marche, Italy. He was ordained as a deacon in 1709 and archbishop in 1711. He was made a cardinal by Pope Benedict XIII on 29 December 1724. He participated in the papal conclave of 1730.

Cardinal Mario Marefoschi was his nephew.
