= Jacques Panciatici =

French rally driver (1948–2024)

- Born: Jacques Pancia; 10 November 1948; Marseille, France
- Died: 1 December 2024 (aged 76)
- Occupation: Rally driver

Jacques Panciatici (10 November 1948 – 1 December 2024) was a French rally driver active during the 1970s and 80s. He recorded five top-10 finishes in the French Rally Championship from 1980 to 1988 in Group N.

Panciatici began racing in 1969, driving a Group 5 Renault 8 Major (then Gordini), and became an official VW-France driver in 1979 following his victory in the Renault Challenge.

Panciatici died on 1 December 2024, at the age of 76.
