= Francesco Morgioni =

Most Reverend Francesco Morgioni
- Bishop of Minori
- Church: Catholic Church
- Diocese: Diocese of Minori
- In office: 1705–1712
- Predecessor: Carlo Cutillo
- Successor: Raffaele Tosti
- Previous post: Bishop of Ruvo (1698–1705)

Orders
- Ordination: 28 December 1688
- Consecration: 21 December 1698 by Sebastiano Antonio Tanara

Personal details
- Born: 1 September 1661 Ischia, Italy
- Died: 18 November 1712 (age 51) Minori, Italy

Francesco Morgioni (1 September 1661 – 18 November 1712) was a Roman Catholic prelate who served as Bishop of Minori (1705–1712) and Bishop of Ruvo (1698–1705).

== Biography ==
Francesco Morgioni was born in Ischia, Italy on 1 September 1661. He was ordained a deacon on 27 December 1688 and ordained a priest on 28 December 1688. On 19 December 1698, he was appointed during the papacy of Pope Innocent XII as Bishop of Ruvo. On 21 December 1698, he was consecrated bishop by Sebastiano Antonio Tanara, Cardinal-Priest of Santi Quattro Coronati, with Tommaso Guzzoni, Bishop of Sora, and Domenico Belisario de Bellis, Bishop of Molfetta, serving as co-consecrators. On 18 May 1705, he was appointed during the papacy of Pope Clement XI as Bishop of Minori. He served as Bishop of Minori until his death on 18 November 1712.

== External links and additional sources ==
- Cheney, David M. "Diocese of Ruvo". Catholic-Hierarchy.org. (for Chronology of Bishops) ^{[self-published]}
- Chow, Gabriel. "Diocese of Ruvo (Italy)". GCatholic.org. (for Chronology of Bishops) ^{[self-published]}
- Cheney, David M. "Diocese of Minori". Catholic-Hierarchy.org. (for Chronology of Bishops) ^{[self-published]}
- Chow, Gabriel. "Titular Episcopal See of Minori (Italy)". GCatholic.org. (for Chronology of Bishops) ^{[self-published]}

Catholic Church titles
Preceded by Giovan Donato Giannoni Alitto	Bishop of Ruvo; 1698–1705	Succeeded by Bartolomeo Gambadoro
Preceded by Carlo Cutillo	Bishop of Minori; 1705–1712	Succeeded by Raffaele Tosti
