= Girolamo Parisani =

Most Reverend Girolamo Parisani
- Bishop of Polignano
- Church: Catholic Church
- Diocese: Diocese of Polignano
- In office: 1629–1638
- Predecessor: Francesco Nappi
- Successor: Antonio del Pezzo

Orders
- Consecration: 17 April 1629 by Antonio Marcello Barberini

Personal details
- Died: 1638 Polignano, Italy

Girolamo Parisani or Hieronymus Parisani (died 1653) was a Roman Catholic prelate who served as Bishop of Polignano (1629–1638).

== Biography ==
On 14 March 1629, Girolamo Parisani was appointed during the papacy of Pope Urban VIII as Bishop of Polignano. On 17 April 1629, he was consecrated bishop by Antonio Marcello Barberini, Cardinal-Priest of Sant'Onofrio. He served as Bishop of Polignano until his death in 1638. While bishop he was the principal co-consecrator of Girolamo Magnesi, Bishop of Potenza (1634).

Catholic Church titles
Preceded by Francesco Nappi	Bishop of Polignano; 1629–1653	Succeeded by Antonio del Pezzo
