= Francesco Frosini =

Portrait in the throne room of the archiepiscopal palace in Pisa

Francesco Frosini (22 March 1654 – 22 November 1733) was an Italian nobleman, lawyer and churchman who served as the archbishop of Pisa from 1702 until his death. He is most famous today for his writings.

== Life ==
Frosini was born into a noble family in Pistoia on 22 March 1654. His father was Donato Frosini and his mother Maria Maddalena Nencini. He graduated from the University of Pisa in 1675 with a degree in both laws. In 1685, inspired by the bishop of Pistoia, Gherardo Gherardi, he entered the Catholic priesthood. At the instigation of Grand Duke Cosimo III of Tuscany, he was appointed bishop of Pistoia and Prato in 1701 and then transferred to the archdiocese of Pisa in late 1702. He held diocesan synods in 1707, 1716 and 1725 and compiled their statutes, which were highly influential.

On 2 September 1731, Grand Duke Gian Gastone entrusted Frosini with his "secret political testament", written in then ame of the Florentine people, and disputing the right of the Holy Roman Emperor to treat Tuscany as an imperial fief. In 1732, Frosini requested permission to resign from Pope Clement XII and Gian Gastone, but was denied. He continued in office until his death in Pisa on 22 November 1733.

== Works ==
Frosini is best known today for his synodal statutes. He was a strong opponent of Jansenism. He wrote a refutation of it in a letter addressed to the bishop of Nîmes, Jean César Rousseau de La Parisière, in 1718. He included it in an appendix to his third synod.

Frosini's early works, from before he became a bishop, include Discorso funebre in occasione della morte dell'eminent. Jacopo Rospigliosi, a eulogy of Cardinal Giacomo Rospigliosi, published at Pistoia in 1684, and Gesù crocifisso, a collection of two hundred religious sonnets, dedicated to Cosimo III and his son Ferdinando and published at Pistoia in 1700. He also wrote the libretto for an opera, Il conte de Bacheville, first performed to music by Giovanni Battista Bassani in 1696 at Pistoia and later to music (now lost) by Sebastiano Cherici at Pistoia in 1699.

In 1715, drawing on his legal background, Frosini wrote his Discorso legale sopra la libertà dello Stato fiorentino e la niuna sua dependenza dall'Imperio ('Legal Discourse on the Liberty of the Florentine State and Its Non-Dependence on the Empire'), a defence of the sovereignty of the Grand Duchy of Tuscany against the claims of the Holy Roman Emperor. It was never published and is known only from two manuscripts copies, one among the papers of the diplomat-turned-cardinal Neri Maria Corsini. The Discorso argues that Tuscany had acquired sovereignty by prescription and that all imperial rights over it had lapsed.

As archbishop, Frosini wrote a work of prose and verse praising Pisa's patron saint, Rainerius. Entitled S. Ranieri esposto alla pubblica divozione da un suo divoto nel raccogliere tutto quello che può più di notabile ritrovarsi dagli scrittori della sua vita, it was published at Lucca in 1717. He lavished more effort, however, on a biography of Gherardi, Vita di mons. G. Gherardi patrizio fiorentino vescovo di Pistoja e Prato, published posthumously in 1736.

== Bibliography ==
- Fantappiè, Carlo (1998). "Frosini, Francesco". Dizionario Biografico degli Italiani (in Italian). Vol. 50: Francesco 1. Sforza–Gabbi. Rome: Istituto dell'Enciclopedia Italiana. ISBN 978-88-12-00032-6.
- Salerno, Emanuele (2026). "War Laws and Florentine State Liberty: Archbishop Francesco Frosini's Legal Discourse in the Bellum Diplomaticum of the Early Eighteenth Century Between the Grand Duchy of Tuscany and the Holy Roman Empire". Grotiana. doi:10.1163/18760759-20262001.
- Smith, P.; Vanscheeuwijck, M. (2001). "Bassani, Giovanni Battista". Grove Music Online.
- Surian, Elvidio (1992). "Cherici, Sebastiano". In Stanley Sadie (ed.). The New Grove Dictionary of Opera. Vol. 1: A–D. Macmillan. p. 832.
