= Notitia ecclesiarum urbis Romae =

The Notitia ecclesiarum urbis Romae ('list of the churches of the city of Rome') or Salzburg Itinerary is a pilgrims' guide composed in the mid 7th century, perhaps under Pope Honorius I. It was discovered in a codex in Salzburg and is now in the Austrian National Library.

It is the earliest surviving pilgrims' itinerary for Rome and was almost certainly written by an inhabitant of Rome who knew the sites described well. It lists the basilicas and Christian cemeteries in Rome. The cemeteries outside the walls are described, starting with the furthest from the centre and moving to those under the Aurelian Walls, as well as clockwise from the Catacombs of San Valentino to the Vatican necropolis.

== Bibliography ==
- Birch, Debra Julie. Pilgrimage to Rome in the Middle Ages: Continuity and Change, Vol. 13. Boydell & Brewer Ltd, 2000.
