= Catacomb of San Pancrazio =

Ancient Roman site

- Catacomba di San Pancrazio
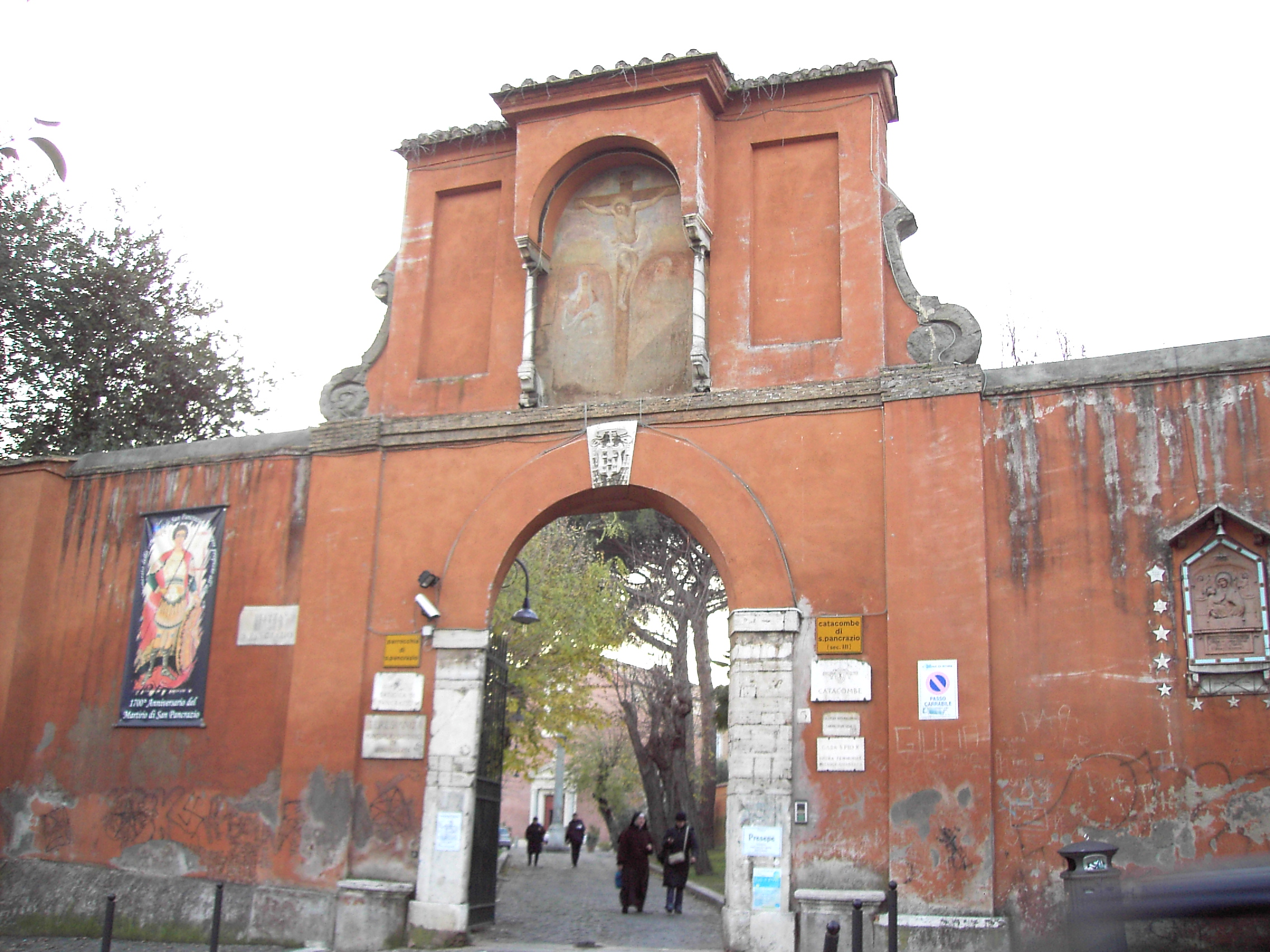
- Interactive map of Catacomb of San Pancrazio
- 41.885°N 12.454°E
- Type: Catacomb
- Periods: Early Christian
- Location: Rome, Italy

Site notes
- Management: Pontifical Commission of Sacred Archaeology
- Public access: Yes
- Website: www.sanpancrazio.org

The Catacomb of San Pancrazio (also called of Ottavilla) is a catacomb of Rome (Italy), located in the Via Aurelia, within the modern Quartiere Gianicolense.

== The martyrs ==
The catacomb is especially known to have Pancras from Phrygia, a famous martyr, buried within its walls. The first notice of the martyrdom of Pancras comes from the Martyrologium Hieronymianum that sets the date of the death at 12 May.

Pancras was entrusted to his uncle Dionysus at age 8, after his parents died, and they both came to Rome. Saint Pancras converted to Christianity while in Rome. At the age of 14, he was beheaded in May 304 AD when he refused to sacrifice to the Roman gods. Diocletian, emperor at the time, was impressed with young Pancras and how he had the courage to refuse sacrificing to the gods, so he offered Pancras money and power to leave the Christian faith, but Pancras still refused and so was beheaded. His body was abandoned on the Via Aurelia and was picked up by a Christian matron, Ottavilla, who buried him. Ottavilla found the body and the head on May 12, 304, picked them up, wrapped Pancras in precious linen and buried him specifically in the catacombs that stood there. His head was eventually placed in a precious manner in the Basilica where the body lies in an urn reading "Hic decollatus fuit Sanctus Pancratius" ("Here Saint Pancras was beheaded"). His body now rests among other martyrs buried in the Catacombs.

The ancient sources, particularly the Medieval itineraries for pilgrims, mention other martyrs buried within the catacomb: Artemy, Paulina, Sophia and her three daughters Faith, Hope and Charity. The resting place of the last four martyrs can probably be identified with the so-called cubiculum of St. Sophia.

The cult of St. Pancras spread during the Middle Ages, so much so that the catacomb bearing his name was one of the few in Rome that could always be visited by pilgrims.

== History ==
Between the end of the 4th century and the beginning of the 5th, Pope Symmachus built a basilica above the catacomb consecrated to the martyr and a thermal edifice. In 594 Gregory the Great provided the basilica with a cloister. In 625 Pope Honorius I rebuilt the basilica after a Greek-Gothic war, with three naves. Pope Honorius' rebuilding is the basilica that still exists today.

As mentioned above, San Pancrazio is one of the few catacombs in Rome whose track has not been completely lost during the centuries, even if it has often been confused with other catacombs rising along the Via Aurelia. Antonio Bosio thoroughly studied the cemetery, but he confused it with the cemetery of Calepodius; the two catacombs were distinguished by Giovanni Battista de Rossi in the 19th century.

Excavations carried out at the beginning of the 1930s under the floor of the Basilica of San Pancrazio led to the discovery of a Roman street that cut in two, diagonally to the church; they also brought to light some mausolea and ground graves, both inside the basilica and in its square, such demonstrating that the hypogeous cemetery also included an extended funerary area on the topsoil.

== Topography and description ==
The Catacomb of San Pancrazio is not in the most perfect condition: the tunnels are mostly destroyed and therefore the visit to see the Catacomb is very short.

The hypogeous cemetery can be divided into three main regions:

- The first region is placed below the left transept of the basilica and behind the apse and its access is still the former entrance, within the left nave. This region was explored in the first half of the 20th century by Father Fusciardi.
- In the right nave, a trapdoor gives access to the second region, placed below the square in front of the basilica. In this region it is possible to visit:

The cubicle of Botrys, from the name of the decedent buried in it. The peculiarity of this grave is that, on his headstone, Botrys declares himself as a christianós, an unusual expression in the Christian graveyards.

The cubicle of Saint Felix, dating back to the end of the 3rd and the beginning of the 4th century, decorated with a linear red style and elements referring to the sea (ships and fishes).

The cubicle of Saint Sophia, housing a white-plastered arcosolium with four graves, that are believed to be the martyr Sophia and her three daughters'.

- Finally, the third region is placed below the cloister. Within the third region there are widespread Constantinian Christograms, which lead the researchers to believe that this part of the hypogeous cemetery has been built in the 4th century.

== Bibliography ==
De Santis L. Biamonte G., Le catacombe di Roma, Newton & Compton Editori, Rome 1997, pp. 128–132 Cecchelli M., San Pancrazio, Rome, Marietti 1972 Verrando G. N., Le numerose recensioni della passio Pancratii, in "Vetera Christianorum" 19 (1982) 105–129 Nestori A., La basilica di S. Pancrazio in Roma, in Rivista di Archeologia Cristiana 36 (1960) 213–248

== Work cited ==
- Anonymous. “Pancras of Rome.” Hymns and Chants, .
- Teahan, Madeleine, and Carol Glatz. “The Saint Whose Name Was given to a Famous Railway Station.” CatholicHerald.co.uk, Catholic Herald, 8 May 2014, .
- “La Storia Di San Pancrazio.” San Pancrazio - Roma, Padre Ernest , [www.sanpancrazio.org/la-storia-di-san-pancrazio].
- Ernest, Padre. “Basilica Di San Pancrazio.” San Pancrazio - Roma, Padre Ernest , 28 Oct. 2018, .
