= Roman Catholic Diocese of Polignano =

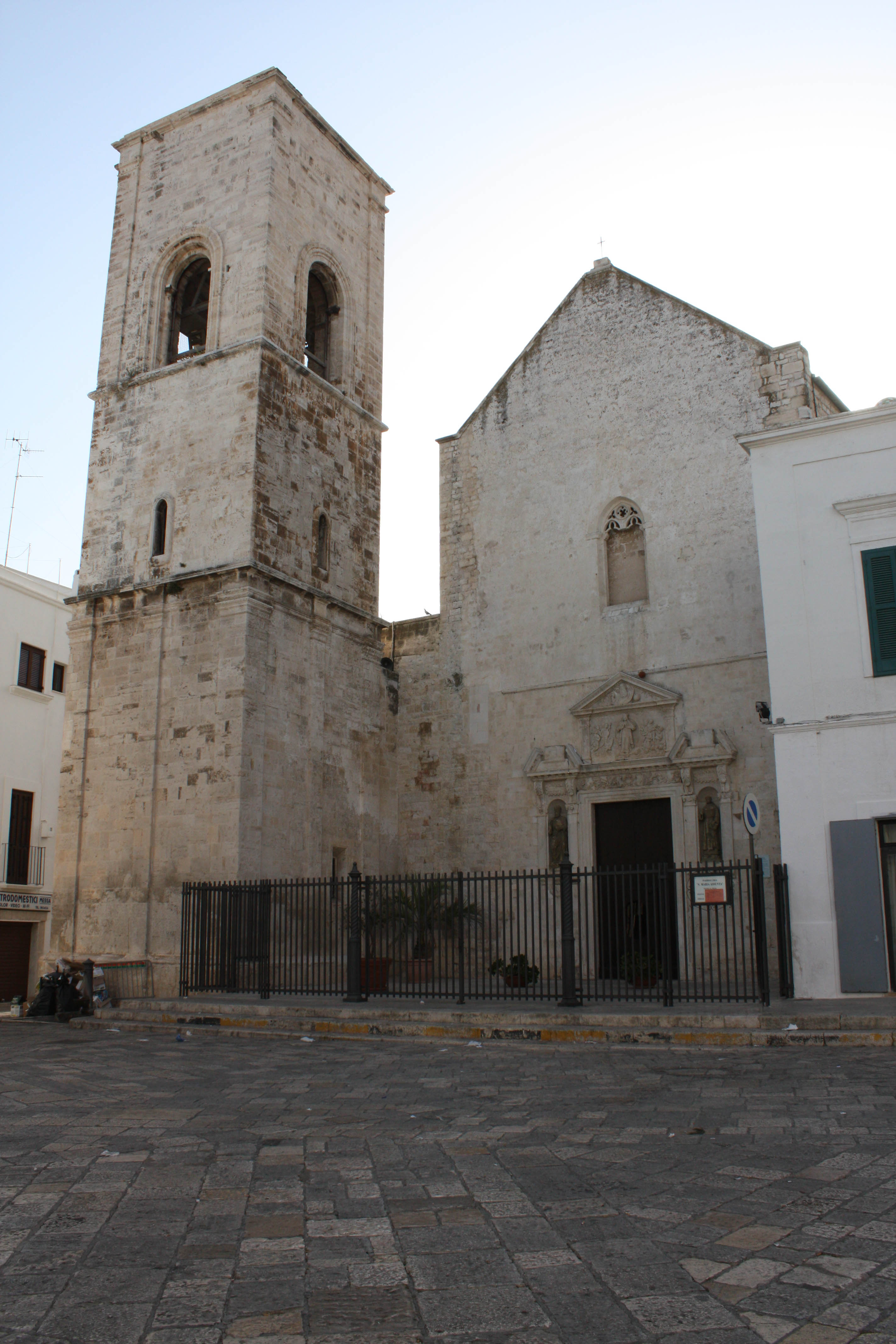
cathedral square, Polignano, with campanile

The Diocese of Polignano or Diocese of Polinianum (Latin: Dioecesis Polinianensis) was a Roman Catholic diocese located in the town of Polignano in the province of Bari, Apulia, southern Italy, located on the Adriatic Sea. In 1818, the diocese was suppressed, and its territory and Catholic population were assigned to the Diocese of Monopoli. The title, though not the diocese itself, was restored as a titular See in 1968.

== History ==
It has been claimed that a church, dedicated to Saint Peter, existed in Polignano in the 3rd century; Christianity, however, was still an unauthorized and illegal cult until after the Edict of Milan.

The existence of a papal bull, dated 530, and said to contain a reference to "Rev. Episcopus Polianen.," is mentioned by F.F. Favale. The pope of 530 is not named (there were three, one of whom at least was an antipope), nor the nature of the reference; several forgeries of that year are known.

=== St. Vitus and the diocese of Polignano ===
In 1659, Ferdinando Ughelli published a work entitled, "Translatio S. Viti cum sociis in territorio Polymniani," which apparently marked the establishment of the diocese and the first bishop, in 672. The first part of the narrative takes place on the Amalfi coast, where a princess of Salerno named Florentia is caught in a flood, in a place called Marianus; St. Vitus appears to her, after she has called on God and the local martyrs for help. In return, Vitus commands her to locate his tomb, and those of his two companions, Modestus and Crescentia, which she was unable to do, building a votive church instead. With the help of a hermit named John, over a period of twenty years she located the bodies, and buried them in her church. Florentia then went on a pilgrimage, in a large well-stocked ship built for her by her brother, who became ill during her absence in Jerusalem. Her prayers were of no help, but S. Vitus appeared to her in a dream, reminding her that he had expressed the wish to be buried at "Marianus". When she awoke, he appeared to her in the form of the doctor, and told her that he wished to be in Apulia in a place near Castro Polymnianense. On the return journey from the Holy Land, a young man appeared on the yardarms, and announced that he was Vitus of Lucania, and on the 24th day, the ship reached Marianum. They debarked, and sent a messenger to Bari, where they bought horses, and within a week had found the place where the sarcophagi in which the bodies of the saints were resting. Archbishop Nicholas of Salerno had the bodies exhumed, placed in silk, and exposed for veneration. They then sent letters and messengers to the pope to explain their doings, which the pope in return approved.

The party of the prince, princess, and archbishop then collected the relics, and carried them to Canne, where Bishop Petrus of Canne received them kindly, rejoicing in the orders of the pope and the commands of the saints. The archbishop of Salerno and the bishop of Canne then led the entire crowd back to Marianus, which was in the diocese of the bishop of Canne, where they founded a church. The translation of the relics was completed on 26 April [672].

Valentini remarks, "Consequently, scholars have hypothesized that in that same date the church of Polignano might have been raised to the status of an Episcopal See, concomitant with the arrival of Pietro I." But there is no proof whatever. Petrus is not called "bishop of Polignano"; and the first archbishop of Salerno was Amatus, in 983.

=== Papal privileges ===
The diocese of Polignano appears among the dioceses belonging to the ecclesiastical province of Bari in privileges granted by Alexander II (1063), Urban II (1089), Eugenius III (1152), and Alexander III (1172).

=== Chapter and cathedral ===
The cathedral of Polignano was dedicated to the Assumption of the body of the Virgin Mary into Heaven. The cathedral was administered by a corporate body called the Chapter, which was composed of four dignities (the Archdeacon, the Archpriest, and two Primicerii) and eighteen canons.

The medieval cathedral was consecrated in 1295. In 1351, Bishop Nicola da Giovinazzo built the chapel of the Annunciation in the cathedral. In 1513, Bishop Cristoforo Magnavivo (Magnacurius) (1508–1517) reconsecrated the medieval cathedral, which had undergone extensive restoration. In 1600, Bishop Giovanni Battista Guenzato conducted further reconstructions.

=== After the French ===
Following the extinction of the Napoleonic Kingdom of Italy, the Congress of Vienna authorized the restoration of the Papal States and the Kingdom of Naples. Since the French occupation had seen the abolition of many Church institutions in the Kingdom, as well as the confiscation of most Church property and resources, it was imperative that Pope Pius VII and King Ferdinand IV reach agreement on restoration and restitution. Ferdinand demanded the suppression of fifty dioceses. Lengthy, detailed, and acrimonious negotiations ensued. On 17 July 1816, King Ferdinand issued a decree, in which he forbade the reception of any papal document without prior reception of the royal exequatur. This meant that prelates could not receive bulls of appointment, consecration, or installation without the king's permission.

A concordat was finally signed on 16 February 1818, and ratified by Pius VII on 25 February 1818. Ferdinand issued the concordat as a law on 21 March 1818. On 27 June 1818, Pius VII issued the bull De Ulteriore, in which, the decision was made to suppress permanently the diocese of Polignano, and to incorporate its territory into the diocese of Monopoli. The former cathedral became a collegiate church.

=== Titular see ===
On 19 July 1968, Rev. Paul Anderson was appointed Auxiliary Bishop and Coadjutor with the right of succession of Sioux Falls, South Dakota, USA, for which purpose he was named titular bishop of Polignano, thereby reviving the title (though not the diocese) of Polignano.

== Bishops of Polignano ==
Erected: 7th Century
Latin Name: Polinianensis
Metropolitan: Archdiocese of Bari-Canosa

=== to 1500 ===
...

- [Ambrosius (1109)]

...

- Milo (attested 1152)

...

- Arpinus (attested 1176–1202)
- Boetius (attested 1208–1217)

...

- Guilelmus (attested 1295, 1327)
- Matthaeus, O.P (1330–1332)
- Bonajuncta de Boscolis (Bonaventura) (1333– ? )
- Guilelmus (attested 1341)
- Bonavinus (attested 1343)
- Nicolaus da Bari, O.P. (1344–1363)
- Nicolaus Albus (1364–1375)
- Pavo de Grifis (1375–1379)
- Pascalis (1379–1382) Avignon Obedience
- Angelus de Cupersano, O.Min. (1382–1393) Avignon Obedience
- Angelo (da Bitonto) (1394– ? ) Avignon Obedience
- Lupulus de Lacu (1390–1391) Roman Obedience
- Angelo Afflitti (1391–1401) Roman Obedience
- Christophorus, O.E.S.A. (1401– ? ) Roman Obedience
- Nicolaus (1411–1420?)
- Paolo Alfatati (1420–1423)
- Paulus, O.F.M. (1424–1460)
- Claudius (1460–1468?)

Latinus Orsini (1468–1472) Administrator

- Jacobus Colae de Toraldo (1473– ? )

=== 1500 to 1818 ===
- Caspar Toraldus (? –1506)
- Michele Claudio (1506–1508)
- Christoforo Magnacurius (1508–1517 Resigned)
- Giacomo Framarini (1517–1540 Resigned)
- Rosmano Casamassima (1541–1544 Resigned)
- Pietro Antonio Casamassima (1544–1570 Died)
- Francesco Angelo Gazzino, O.P. (1570–1572 Died)
- Pietro Francesco Ferri (1572–1580 Died)
- Raffaele Tomei (1580–1598 Died)
- Giovanni Battista Guanzato (1598–1607 Died)
- Giovanni Maria Guanzelli, O.P. (1607–1619 Died)
- Francesco Nappi (1619–1628)
- Girolamo Parisani (1629–1638)
- Antonio del Pezzo (1638–1641 Appointed, Archbishop of Sorrento)
- Giovanni Domenico Moroli, O.S.B. (1642–1649)
- Vincenzo Pineri, O.F.M. Conv. (1649–1672 Resigned)
- Scipione de Martinis (1672–1681)
- Ignatius Fiumi, O.P. (1681–1694 Died)
- Giovanni Battista Capilupi (1694–1716)
- Pietro Antonio Pini (1718–1736)
- Andreas Venditti (Vinditti) (1737–1767)
- Francesco Broccoli (1767–1775)
- Mattia Santoro (1775–1797)

Sede vacante (1798–1818)

Suppressed: 1818; territory assigned to the Diocese of Monopoli

== See also ==
- Roman Catholic Archdiocese of Bari-Bitonto
- List of Catholic dioceses in Italy
- Catholic Church in Italy

== Books ==
=== Reference Works ===
- Eubel, Conradus, ed. (1913). Hierarchia catholica (in Latin). Vol. 1 (2nd ed.). Münster: Libreria Regensbergiana.
- Eubel, Conradus, ed. (1914). Hierarchia catholica (in Latin). Vol. 2 (2nd ed.). Münster: Libreria Regensbergiana.
- Eubel, Conradus, ed. (1923). Hierarchia catholica (in Latin). Vol. 3 (2nd ed.). Münster: Libreria Regensbergiana.
- Gams, Pius Bonifatius (1873). Series episcoporum Ecclesiae catholicae: quotquot innotuerunt a beato Petro apostolo. Ratisbon: Typis et Sumptibus Georgii Josephi Manz. p. 913. (Use with caution; obsolete)
- Gauchat, Patritius (Patrice) (1935). Hierarchia catholica IV (1592-1667) (in Latin). Münster: Libraria Regensbergiana.
- Ritzler, Remigius; Sefrin, Pirminus (1952). Hierarchia catholica medii et recentis aevi V (1667-1730) (in Latin). Patavii: Messagero di S. Antonio.
- Ritzler, Remigius; Sefrin, Pirminus (1958). Hierarchia catholica medii et recentis aevi VI (1730-1799) (in Latin). Patavii: Messagero di S. Antonio.

=== Studies ===
- Cappelletti, Giuseppe (1870). Le chiese d'Italia dalla loro origine sino ai nostri giorni (in Italian). Vol. vigesimoprimo (21). Venezia: Antonelli. pp. 389–393.
- D'Avino, Vincenzio (1848). Cenni storici sulle chiese arcivescovili, vescovili, e prelatizie (nullius) del regno delle due Sicilie (in Italian). Naples: dalle stampe di Ranucci.
- Kamp, Norbert (1975). Kirche und Monarchie im staufischen Königreich Sizilien: I. Prosopographische Grundlegung, Bistumer und Bistümer und Bischöfe des Konigreichs 1194–1266: 2. Apulien und Calabrien München: Wilhelm Fink 1975.
- Kehr, Paulus Fridolin (1962). Italia pontificia. Regesta pontificum Romanorum. Vol. IX: Samnia – Apulia – Lucania. Berlin: Weidmann. (in Latin), pp. 369–370.
- Klewitz, Hans-Walter (1933). "Zur geschichte der bistumsorganisation Campaniens und Apuliens im 10. und 11. Jahrhundert", (in German), in: Quellen und Forschungen aus italienischen archiven und bibliotheken, XXIV (1932–33), pp. 58–59.
- Ughelli, Ferdinando; Coleti, NIccolo (1721). Italia sacra sive De episcopis Italiæ, et insularum adjacentium (in Latin). Vol. Tomus septimus (7). Venice: apud Sebastianum Coleti. pp. 749–762.
- Valentini, Bianca Tavassi La Greca; Santos, Ricardo De Mambro (2017). The Church of Santa Maria Assunta at Polignano a mare. The History of a Monument. Bari: Mario Adda Editore.
