= San Pancrazio =

- Basilica of Saint Pancras
- Basilica di San Pancrazio
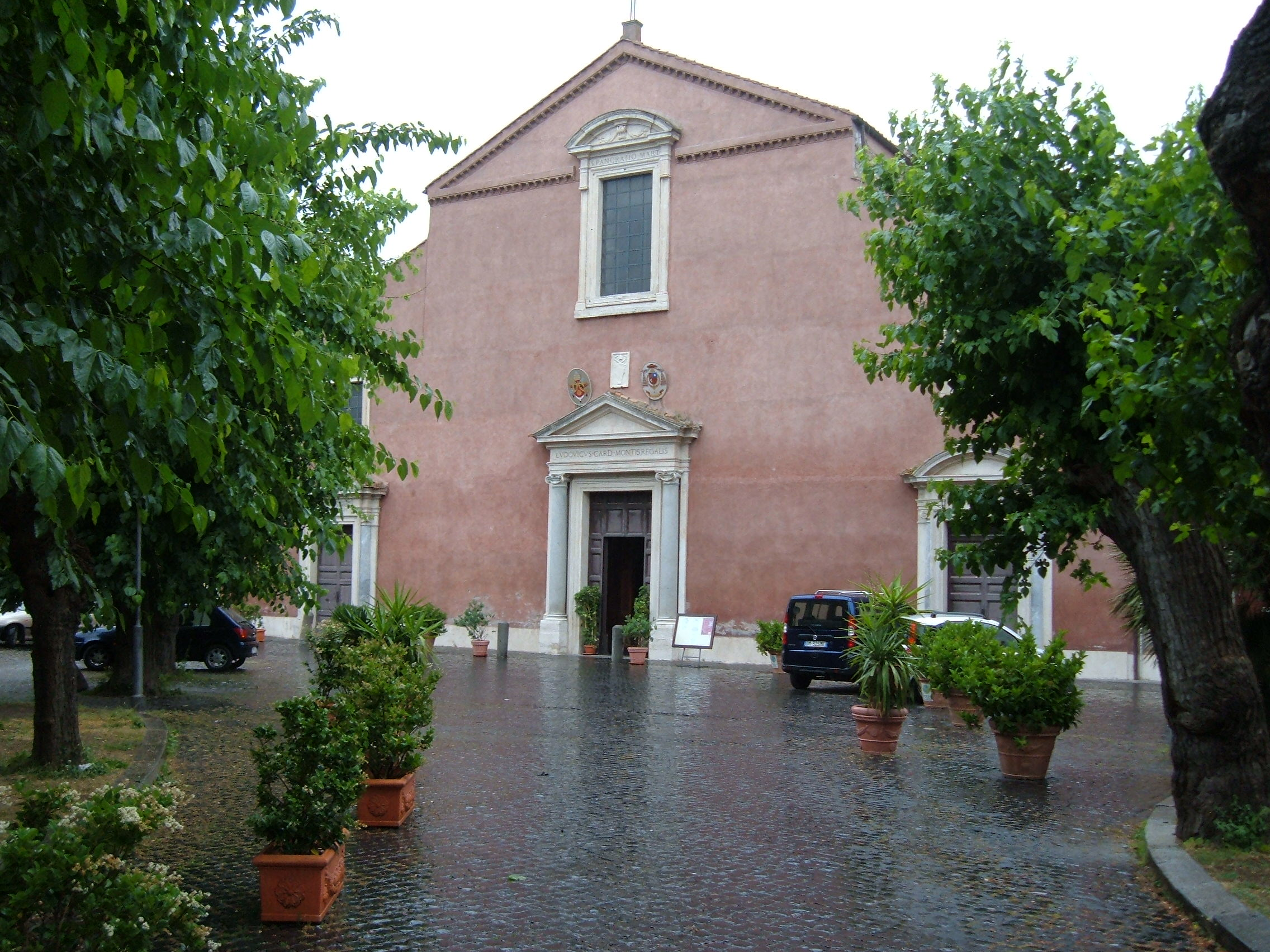
- Facade
- Click on the map for a fullscreen view
- 41°53′06″N 12°27′14″E
- Location: Piazza di S. Pancrazio 5D, Rome
- Country: Italy
- Language: Italian
- Denomination: Catholic
- Tradition: Roman Rite
- Religious order: Discalced Carmelites
- Website: sanpancrazio.org

History
- Status: titular church, minor basilica
- Founded: 5th century AD
- Founder: Pope Symmachus
- Dedication: Pancras of Rome

Architecture
- Architectural type: Paleochristian, Renaissance
- Completed: 1849

Administration
- Diocese: Rome

The basilica of San Pancrazio (English: St Pancras; Latin: S. Pancratii) is a Catholic minor basilica and titular, conventual, and parish church founded by Pope Symmachus in the 6th century in Rome, Italy. It stands in via S. Pancrazio, westward beyond the Porta San Pancrazio that opens in a stretch of the Aurelian Wall on the Janiculum and covers the Catacomb of San Pancrazio. The adjacent convent was established perhaps as early as the church and has been occupied by the Discalced Carmelite since 1662.

The Cardinal Priest of the Titulus S. Pancratii is Antonio Cañizares Llovera. Other previous titulars include Pope Paul IV (15 January – 24 September 1537) and Pope Clement VIII (18 December 1585 – 30 January 1592).

== History ==
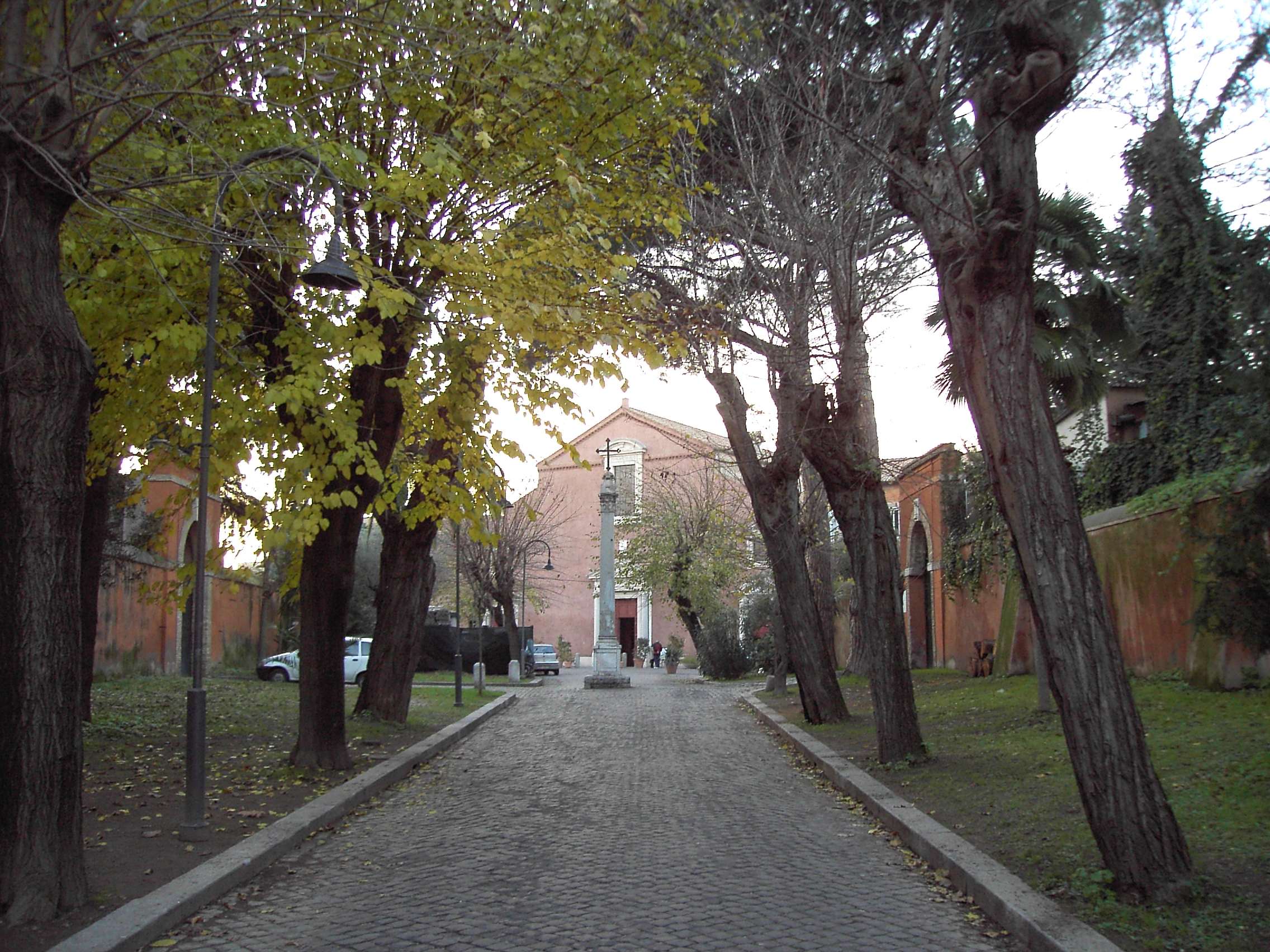
Entrance avenue through the forecourt

The basilica was built by Pope Symmachus (498–514), on the place where the body of the young martyr Saint Pancras of Rome, or Pancratius, had been buried, Via Aurelia miliario secundo ('on the Via Aurelia at the second milestone'). The church was originally placed by him under the care of the clergy of the Church of S. Crisogono. Due to their neglect of the site, Pope Gregory I (590–604) handed it over to the members of the newly founded Benedictine Order after the Lombards sacked their monastery of Montecassino in 580. In the seventh century Pope Honorius I (625–638) built a larger church for the increasing numbers of pilgrims; he placed the relics of the saint beneath the high altar, with a window of access from a semi-circular corridor that led behind and below the altar. In the 17th century, it was given to the Discalced Carmelites, who completely remodeled it. The church underwent further rebuilding in the 19th century, having been heavily damaged during the French attack on the incipient Roman Republic in 1849; but it retains its plain brick facade of the late 15th century, with the arms of Pope Innocent VIII.

Below the church there are huge catacombs, the Catacomb of San Pancrazio or di Ottavilla. Entrance is next to the small Museo di S. Pancrazio with fragments of sculpture and pagan and early Christian inscriptions.

== Cardinal-Priests of San Pancrazio ==
The Church of S. Pancrazio was established as the titulus of a Cardinal-Priest by Pope Leo X on 6 July 1517.

- Ferdinando Ponzetti (1517–1527)
- Francesco Corner (1528–1534)
- Gian Pietro Carafa (1537)
- Federico Cesi (1545–1550)
- Juan Álvarez de Toledo (1551–1553)
- Miguel da Silva (1553)
- Giovanni Antonio Capizucchi (1556–1562)
- Bernardo Navagero (1562)
- Stanislaus Hosius (1562–1565)
- Simone Pasqua (1565)
- Tolomeo Gallio (1565–1568)
- Gianpaolo Della Chiesa (1568–1575)
- Ippolito Aldobrandini (1586–1592)
- Girolamo Mattei (1592–1603)
- Pietro Aldobrandini (1604–1605)
- Domenico Ginnasi (1605–1606)
- Ludovico de Torres (1606–1609)
- Gabriel Trejo y Paniagua (1617–1621)
- Cosimo de Torres (1623–1641)
- Gaspare Mattei (1643–1648)
- Francesco Maidalchini (1653–1654)
- Carlo Gualterio (1654–1667)
- Giacomo Franzoni (1670–1673)
- Pietro Vidoni (1673–1681)
- Antonio Pignatelli (1681–1691)
- Bandino Panciatichi (1691–1710)
- Damian Hugo Philipp von Schönborn (1721–1726)
- Vincenzo Ludovico Gotti, O.P. (1728–1738)
- Gioacchino Besozzi, O.Cist. (1743–1744)
- Federico Marcello Lante (1745–1753)
- Giuseppe Maria Feroni (1753–1764)
- Giovanni Battista Bussi (1824–1844)
- Carlo Vizzardelli (1848–1851)
- Clément Villecourt (1855–1867)
- Josip Mihalovic (1877–1891)
- Francesco Ricci Paracciani (1891–1894)
- Achille Manara (1895–1906)
- Aristide Rinaldini (1907–1920)
- Giovanni Bonzano (1922–1924)
- Lorenzo Lauri (1927–1941)
- Carlos Carmelo de Vasconcelos Motta (1946–1982)
- José Lebrún Moratinos (1983–2001)
- Antonio Cañizares Llovera (2006–)

== Bibliography ==
- Richart Krautheimer, Corpus Basilicarum Christianarum Romae: The Early Christian Basilicas of Rome (IV–IX Cent.) Part II (Roma: 1937), pp. 153–177.
- John Crook, The Architectural Setting of the Cult of Saints in the Early Christian West c. 300 – c. 1200 (Oxford: Clarendon 2000), pp. 82–83.
- Giuseppe Burragato and Antonio Palumbo, Sulle orme di San Pancrazio, martire romano. Culto, basilica, catacombe (Morena (Roma) : Edizioni OCD, 2004).

Preceded by San Nicola in Carcere	Landmarks of Rome; San Pancrazio	Succeeded by San Pietro in Vincoli
