= Domenico Belisario de Bellis =

17th-century Italian Catholic bishop

Most Reverend Domenico Belisario de Bellis
- Church: Catholic Church
- In office: 1696–1701
- Predecessor: Pietro Vecchia (bishop)
- Successor: Giovanni degli Effetti

Orders
- Ordination: 20 September 1670
- Consecration: 25 February 1696 by Bandino Panciatici

Personal details
- Born: 2 March 1647 Turi, Apulia, Italy
- Died: 17 January 1701 (age 53) Molfetta, Italy

Domenico Belisario de Bellis (2 March 1647 – 17 January 1701) was a Roman Catholic prelate who served as Bishop of Molfetta (1696–1701).

== Biography ==
Domenico Belisario de Bellis was born in Turi, Apulia, Italy on 2 March 1647. He was ordained a deacon on 21 December 1669 and ordained a priest on 20 September 1670. On 23 January 1696, he was appointed during the papacy of Pope Innocent XII as Bishop of Molfetta. On 25 February 1696, he was consecrated bishop by Bandino Panciatici, Cardinal-Priest of San Pancrazio, with Carlo Loffredo, Archbishop of Bari-Canosa, and Giovanni Battista Visconti Aicardi, Bishop of Novara, serving as co-consecrators. He served as Bishop of Molfetta until his death on 17 January 1701.

== Episcopal succession ==
Episcopal succession of Domenico Belisario de Bellis

While bishop, he was the principal consecrator of:

- Fernand Palma d'Artois, Titular Archbishop of Ancyra (1696);
- Filippo Anastasio, Archbishop of Sorrento (1699);
- Francesco Girgenti, Bishop of Patti (1699);
- Giuseppe Falces, Bishop of Pozzuoli (1699);
- Vincenzo Corcione, Bishop of Capaccio (1699);
- Antonio Rosignoli, Bishop of Arbe (1700);
- Emanuele Cicatelli, Bishop of Avellino e Frigento (1700);
- Nicolò Cervini, Bishop of Lavello (1700);

While bishop, he was the principal co-consecrator of:

- Agustín Antonio de Arellano, Archbishop of Brindisi (1698);
- Ambrogio Croce, Bishop of Bobbio (1698);
- Gaetano De Andrea, Bishop of Monopoli (1698);
- Michele Gallo Vandeinde, Bishop of Capri (1698);
- Antonio Forteguerra, Bishop of Pienza (1698);
- Giulio Troili, Bishop of Foligno (1698);
- Giovanni Vincenzo de Filippi, Bishop of Cefalonia e Zante (1698);
- Sebastiano Feoli, Bishop of Guardialfiera (1698);
- Francesco Morgioni, Bishop of Ruvo (1698);
- Fabrizio Maffei, Bishop of Penne e Atri (1698);
- Giovanni Cito, Bishop of Lettere-Gragnano (1698);
- Biagio Terzi, Bishop of Isernia (1698);
- Luca Trapani, Bishop of Ischia (1698);
- François Amédée Milliet d'Arvillars, Bishop of Aosta (1699);
- Giovanni Battista Braschi, Bishop of Sarsina (1699);
- Francesco Antonio Gaudiosi, Bishop of Bova (1699);
- Giovanni Giuseppe Bonaventura, Bishop of Ascoli Piceno (1699);
- Philippus Albini, Bishop of Sant'Agata de' Goti (1699);
- Giovanni Francesco Nicolai, Titular Bishop of Berytus (1700);
- Giovanni Dominico Tomati, Titular Bishop of Cyrene (1700);
- Tommaso d'Aquino, Bishop of Vico Equense (1700); and
- Giovanni Battista Capano, Bishop of Bitonto (1700).

== External links and additional sources ==
- Cheney, David M. "Diocese of Molfetta-Ruvo-Giovinazzo-Terlizzi". Catholic-Hierarchy.org. (for Chronology of Bishops) ^{[self-published]}
- Chow, Gabriel. "Diocese of Molfetta-Ruvo-Giovinazzo-Terlizzi (Italy)". GCatholic.org. (for Chronology of Bishops) ^{[self-published]}

Catholic Church titles
Preceded by Pietro Vecchia (bishop)	Bishop of Molfetta; 1696–1701	Succeeded by Giovanni degli Effetti
