= Opilio Rossi =

His Eminence Opilio Rossi
- President of the Pontifical Committee for International Eucharistic Congresses
- Church: Roman Catholic Church
- Appointed: 5 December 1983
- Term ended: 3 January 1991
- Successor: Édouard Gagnon
- Other post: Cardinal-Priest of San Lorenzo in Lucina (1987–2004)
- Previous posts: Apostolic Nuncio to Ecuador (1953–59); Titular Archbishop of Ancyra (1953–76); Apostolic Nuncio to Chile (1959–61); Apostolic Nuncio to Austria (1961–76); Cardinal-Deacon of Santa Maria Liberatrice a Monte Testaccio (1976–87); President of the Pontifical Council for the Family (1976–81); President of the Pontifical Council for the Laity (1976–81); Protodeacon (1983–87); President of the Commission of Cardinals for the Pontifical Shrines of Pompeii, Loreto and Bari (1984–93)

Orders
- Ordination: 11 March 1933 by Ersilio Menzani
- Consecration: 27 December 1953 by Aloisius Joseph Muench
- Created cardinal: 24 May 1976 by Pope Paul VI
- Rank: Cardinal-Deacon (1976–87); Cardinal-Priest (1987–2004)

Personal details
- Born: Opilio Rossi; 14 May 1910 New York, United States of America
- Died: 9 February 2004 (aged 93) Domus Internationalis Paulus VI, Rome, Italy
- Parents: Angelo Rossi; Davidina Ciappa
- Education: Pontifical Roman Athenaeum Saint Apollinare; Pontifical Academy of Ecclesiastical Nobles
- Motto: Omnia in Christo
- Coat of arms

Styles of Opilio Rossi
- Reference style: His Eminence
- Spoken style: Your Eminence
- Informal style: Cardinal
- See: Ancyra (titular see)

Opilio Rossi (14 May 1910 – 9 February 2004) was a cardinal of the Roman Catholic Church and president of the Pontifical Council for the Laity.

== Early life and priesthood ==
He was born in New York, the son of Angelo Rossi and Davidina Ciappa. The family moved to Italy when he was a young boy.

He was educated at the Collegio Alberoni in Piacenza and later the Pontifical Roman Athenaeum "S. Apollinare" in Rome where he earned a doctorate in canon law with a thesis on St. Basil.

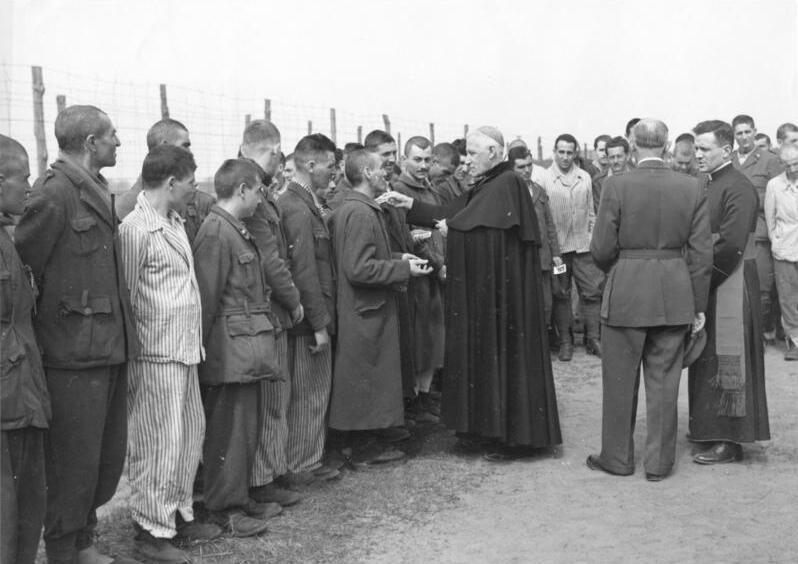
Rossi (right, with officer) visiting a POW camp.

He was ordained on 11 March 1933 in Rome. He was incardinated in diocese of Piacenza. He served as an attaché at Vatican Secretariat of State from 1937 until 1938. He was created Privy chamberlain supernumerary on 1 September 1938. He was attached to the diplomatic corps serving as the secretary of the nunciature in Belgium from 1938 until 1939 and in the Netherlands from 1939 to 1940. He was promoted to the Auditor of the nunciature in Germany from 1940 until 1945 and served in the same position in the Netherlands from 1945 to 1948. After World War II he was a counselor of the nunciature in Germany from 1951 until 1953.

== Episcopate ==
He was appointed titular archbishop of Ancyra and appointed nuncio to Ecuador on 21 November 1953 by Pope Pius XII. He was consecrated on 27 December 1953. He was transferred to the nunciature in Chile on 25 March 1959 and again to Austria on 25 September 1961. He attended the Second Vatican Council from 1962 until the close of the council in 1965.

== Cardinalate ==
He was created Cardinal Deacon of S. Maria Liberatrice a Monte Testaccio by Pope Paul VI in the consistory of 24 May 1976. He was appointed as President of the Pontifical Council for the Laity on 20 December 1976. He took part in the conclaves that elected Pope John Paul I and Pope John Paul II in August 1978 and October 1978. He resigned the presidency of the Pontifical Council for the Laity on 8 April 1984 and was succeeded by Cardinal Eduardo Pironio.

He was Cardinal protodeacon (that is the longest serving Cardinal-Deacon) from 2 February 1983 until 22 June 1987.

He opted for the order of cardinal priests after being ten years as a cardinal deacon and received the title of San Lorenzo in Lucina on 22 June 1987. He lost the right to participate in a conclave when turned 80 years of age in 1990.

== Death ==
He died in 2004, at the Domus Internationalis Paulus VI in Rome. He is buried at the chapel of Madonna di Lourdes, parish church of Scopolo, diocese of Piacenza-Bobbio, where he used to pray as a child.

Catholic Church titles
Preceded by Maurice Roy	President of the Pontifical Council for the Laity; 20 December 1976 – 8 April 1984	Succeeded by Eduardo Francisco Pironio
Preceded by Umberto Mozzoni	Cardinal Protodeacon; 2 February 1983 – 22 June 1987	Succeeded by Giuseppe Caprio
