= Girolamo Sarriano =

Italian Roman Catholic prelate

Most Reverend Girolamo Sarriano
- Bishop of Vico Equense
- Church: Catholic Church
- Diocese: Diocese of Vico Equense
- In office: 1611–1627
- Predecessor: Luigi de Franchis
- Successor: Luigi Riccio (bishop)

Personal details
- Born: 1580 Naples, Italy
- Died: 23 July 1627 (age 47) Vico Equense, Italy

Girolamo Sarriano, C.R. (1580–1627) was a Roman Catholic prelate who served as Bishop of Vico Equense (1611–1627).

== Biography ==
Girolamo Sarriano was born in Naples, Italy in 1580 and ordained a priest in the Congregation of Clerics Regular of the Divine Providence. On 31 January 1611, he was appointed during the papacy of Pope Paul V as Bishop of Vico Equense. He served as Bishop of Vico Equense until his death on 23 July 1627. While bishop, he was the principal co-consecrator of Cristoforo Caetani, Coadjutor Bishop of Foligno (1623).

== External links and additional sources ==
- Cheney, David M. "Diocese of Vico Equense". Catholic-Hierarchy.org. (for Chronology of Bishops) ^{[self-published]}
- Chow, Gabriel. "Titular Episcopal See of Vico Equense (Italy)". GCatholic.org. (for Chronology of Bishops) ^{[self-published]}

Catholic Church titles
Preceded by Luigi de Franchis	Bishop of Vico Equense; 1611–1627	Succeeded by Luigi Riccio (bishop)
