= Ancyra (Catholic titular see) =

Titular bishopric of Ankara, Turkey

The Archdiocese of Ancyra (Latin: Archidioecesis Ancyrana) is a suppressed titular see of the Roman Catholic Church. It was established in the 17th century as the Catholic counterpart to the Orthodox residential see, the Metropolis of Ancyra, which existed until the early 20th century at Ankara, in Turkey. The see has been vacant since 24 May 1976.

== Titular bishops ==
- Cesare Nardi, (1 July 1622 - 1633 deceased)
- Fernand Palma d'Artois, (17 September 1696 - 4 January 1700)
- Raimondo Gallani, (January 19, 1708 - March 23, 1722)
- Giusto Fontanini (September 5, 1725 - April 17, 1736)
- Gaetano Calvani (November 20, 1747 - 1757)
- Angelo Maria Durini (22 December 1766 - 28 April 1796 )
- Giovanni Marchetti (September 26, 1814 - November 15, 1829)
- Mariano Báguena Varona (September 30, 1831 - July 15, 1837)
- Stefano Scerra (April 10, 1851 - January 20, 1859)
- Vincenzo Spaccapietra, (12 September 1859 - April 8, 1862)
- Giacomo Cattani (March 16, 1868 - September 19, 1879)
- Fidel Sutter, (August 2, 1881 - August 30, 1883)
- Giovanni Cirino (November 8, 1884 - May 12, 1896)
- Giulio Vaccaro (November 30, 1896 - March 24, 1898)
- Giacomo Merizzi (28 November 1898 - August 21, 1902 )
- Giulio Tonti (August 23, 1902 - December 6, 1915)
- Pellegrino Francesco Stagni, (January 1, 1916 - September 23, 1918)
- Michele Zezza (July 3, 1919 - April 4, 1923)
- Oreste Giorgi (April 26, 1924 - April 27, 1924)
- Gaetano Cicognani (January 11, 1925 - January 12, 1953)
- Opilio Rossi (21 November 1953 - May 24, 1976)
