= Fornari =

Fornari is a surname. Notable people with the surname include:

- Fabio Fornari (died 1596), Roman Catholic prelate who served as Bishop of Nardò
- Franco Fornari (1921–1985), Italian psychiatrist
- Girolamo Fornari (died 1542), Roman Catholic prelate who served as Bishop of Belcastro
- Maria Vittoria De Fornari Strata (1562–1617), Italian Roman Catholic professed religious and the foundress of the Order of the Annunciation - or Blue Nuns
- Maximiliano Fornari (born 1995), Argentine footballer

== See also ==
- Erick Fornaris (born 1979), Cuban diver
- Fornaro (disambiguation)
