= Luigi Riccio (bishop) =

Italian Roman Catholic prelate

Most Reverend Luigi Riccio
- Bishop of Vico Equense
- Church: Catholic Church
- Diocese: Diocese of Vico Equense
- In office: 1627–1643
- Predecessor: Girolamo Sarriano
- Successor: Alessandro Pauli

Orders
- Consecration: 30 Jan 1628 by Giacomo Theodoli

Personal details
- Born: 1577 Naples, Italy
- Died: 6 Jan 1643 (age 66) Vico Equense, Italy

Luigi Riccio (1577-6 Jan 1643) was a Roman Catholic prelate who served as Bishop of Vico Equense (1627–1643).

== Biography ==
Luigi Riccio was born in Naples, Italy in 1577. On 20 Dec 1627, he was appointed during the papacy of Pope Paul V as Bishop of Vico Equense. On 30 Jan 1628, he was consecrated bishop by Giacomo Theodoli, Archbishop of Amalfi. He served as Bishop of Vico Equense until his death on 6 Jan 1643.

== External links and additional sources ==
- Cheney, David M. "Diocese of Vico Equense". Catholic-Hierarchy.org. (for Chronology of Bishops) ^{[self-published]}
- Chow, Gabriel. "Titular Episcopal See of Vico Equense (Italy)". GCatholic.org. (for Chronology of Bishops) ^{[self-published]}

Catholic Church titles
Preceded by Girolamo Sarriano	Bishop of Vico Equense; 1627–1643	Succeeded by Alessandro Pauli
