= Alessandro Pauli =

Italian Roman Catholic prelate

Most Reverend Alessandro Pauli
- Bishop of Vico Equense
- Church: Catholic Church
- Diocese: Diocese of Vico Equense
- In office: 1643–1645
- Predecessor: Luigi Riccio (bishop)
- Successor: Tommaso Imperato

Orders
- Consecration: 22 March 1643 by Bernardino Spada

Personal details
- Born: 1582 Anagni, Italy
- Died: 23 July 1645 (age 63) Vico Equense, Italy

Alessandro Pauli (1582 – 23 July 1645) was a Roman Catholic prelate who served as Bishop of Vico Equense (1643–1645).

== Biography ==
Luigi Riccio was born in Anagni, Italy in 1582. On 23 February 1643, he was appointed during the papacy of Pope Urban VIII as Bishop of Vico Equense. On 22 March 1643, he was consecrated bishop by Bernardino Spada, Cardinal-Priest of San Pietro in Vincoli with Lelio Falconieri, Titular Archbishop of Thebae, and Alfonso Sacrati, Bishop Emeritus of Comacchio, serving as co-consecrators. He served as Bishop of Vico Equense until his death on 23 July 1645.

== External links and additional sources ==
- Cheney, David M. "Diocese of Vico Equense". Catholic-Hierarchy.org. (for Chronology of Bishops) ^{[self-published]}
- Chow, Gabriel. "Titular Episcopal See of Vico Equense (Italy)". GCatholic.org. (for Chronology of Bishops) ^{[self-published]}

Catholic Church titles
Preceded by Luigi Riccio (bishop)	Bishop of Vico Equense; 1643–1645	Succeeded by Tommaso Imperato
