= Paolo Regio =

Roman Catholic prelate (1545–1607)

Most Reverend Paolo Regio
- Church: Catholic Church
- Diocese: Diocese of Vico Equense
- In office: 1583–1607
- Successor: Luigi de Franchis

Personal details
- Born: 1545
- Died: 1607 (age 62) Vico Equense, Italy

Paolo Regio (1545–1607) was a Roman Catholic prelate who served as Bishop of Vico Equense (1583–1607).

== Biography ==
Paolo Regio was born in 1545. On 10 January 1583, he was appointed during the papacy of Pope Gregory XIII as Bishop of Vico Equense. He served as Bishop of Vico Equense until his death in 1607.

== External links and additional sources ==
- Cheney, David M. "Diocese of Vico Equense". Catholic-Hierarchy.org. (for Chronology of Bishops) ^{[self-published]}
- Chow, Gabriel. "Titular Episcopal See of Vico Equense (Italy)". GCatholic.org. (for Chronology of Bishops) ^{[self-published]}

Catholic Church titles
Preceded by	Bishop of Vico Equense; 1583–1607	Succeeded by Luigi de Franchis
