= Giovanni Battista Repucci =

Roman Catholic bishop

Most Reverend Giovanni Battista Repucci
- Bishop of Vico Equense
- Church: Catholic Church
- Diocese: Diocese of Vico Equense
- In office: 1657–1688
- Predecessor: Tommaso Imperato
- Successor: Francesco Verde

Orders
- Consecration: 24 February 1657 by Marcantonio Franciotti

Personal details
- Born: 1606 Benevento, Italy
- Died: February 1688 (age 82) Vico Equense, Italy

Giovanni Battista Repucci (1606 – February, 1688) was a Roman Catholic prelate who served as Bishop of Vico Equense (1657–1688).

== Biography ==
Giovanni Battista Repucci was born in Chiusano di San Domenico, Italy in 1606. On 19 February 1657, he was appointed during the papacy of Pope Paul V as Bishop of Vico Equense. On 24 February 1657, he was consecrated bishop by Marcantonio Franciotti, Cardinal-Priest of Santa Maria della Pace. He served as Bishop of Vico Equense until his death in February 1688. His tomb has recently published for the first time by Gianpasquale Greco. The funerary portrait in marble has been referred to a local young sculptor, probably Lorenzo Vaccaro.

== External links and additional sources ==
- Cheney, David M. "Diocese of Vico Equense". Catholic-Hierarchy.org. (for Chronology of Bishops) ^{[self-published]}
- Chow, Gabriel. "Titular Episcopal See of Vico Equense (Italy)". GCatholic.org. (for Chronology of Bishops) ^{[self-published]}

Catholic Church titles
Preceded by Tommaso Imperato	Bishop of Vico Equense; 1657–1688	Succeeded by Francesco Verde
