= Gerolamo Ventimiglia =

18th-century Italian Roman Catholic bishop

Most Reverend Gerolamo Ventimiglia
- Bishop of Lipari
- Church: Catholic Church
- Diocese: Diocese of Lipari
- In office: 1694–1709
- Predecessor: Gaetano de Castillo
- Successor: Nicola Maria Tedeschi

Orders
- Consecration: 25 July 1694 by Galeazzo Marescotti

Personal details
- Born: 1644 Palermo, Italy
- Died: 17 December 1709 (age 65) Lipari, Italy

Gerolamo Ventimiglia, C.R. (1644–1709) was a Roman Catholic prelate who served as Bishop of Lipari (1694–1709).

== Biography ==
Gerolamo Ventimiglia was born in Palermo, Italy in 1644 and ordained a priest in the Congregation of Clerics Regular of the Divine Providence. On 19 July 1694, he was appointed during the papacy of Pope Innocent XII as Bishop of Lipari. On 25 July 1694, he was consecrated bishop by Galeazzo Marescotti, Cardinal-Priest of Santi Quirico e Giulitta, Prospero Bottini, Titular Archbishop of Myra, and Stefano Giuseppe Menatti, Titular Bishop of Cyrene, serving as co-consecrators. He served as Bishop of Lipari until his death on 17 December 1709.

== Episcopal succession ==
While bishop, Ventimiglia was the principal co-consecrator of:

- Asdrubale Termini, Bishop of Siracusa (1695);
- Tommaso d'Aquino, Bishop of Vico Equense (1700); and
- Giovanni Battista Capano, Bishop of Bitonto (1700).

== External links and additional sources ==
- Cheney, David M. "Diocese of Lipari". Catholic-Hierarchy.org. (for Chronology of Bishops) ^{[self-published]}
- Chow, Gabriel. "Diocese of Lipari (Italy)". GCatholic.org. (for Chronology of Bishops) ^{[self-published]}

Catholic Church titles
Preceded by Gaetano de Castillo	Bishop of Lipari; 1694–1709	Succeeded by Nicola Maria Tedeschi
