= Tommaso Imperato =

Roman Catholic bishop (1596–1656)

Most Reverend Tommaso Imperato
- Bishop of Vico Equense
- Church: Catholic Church
- Diocese: Diocese of Vico Equense
- In office: 1647-1656
- Predecessor: Alessandro Pauli
- Successor: Giovanni Battista Repucci

Orders
- Consecration: 2 June 1647 by Pier Luigi Carafa

Personal details
- Born: 1596 Naples, Italy
- Died: 7 October 1656 (age 60) Vico Equense, Italy

Tommaso Imperato (1596 – 7 October 1656) was a Roman Catholic prelate who served as Bishop of Vico Equense (1647–1656).

== Biography ==
Tommaso Imperato was born in Naples, Italy in 1596. On 27 May 1647, he was appointed during the papacy of Pope Innocent X as Bishop of Vico Equense. On 2 June 1647, he was consecrated bishop by Pier Luigi Carafa, Cardinal-Priest of Santi Silvestro e Martino ai Monti, with Ranuccio Scotti Douglas, Bishop of Borgo San Donnino, and Alessandro Vittrici, Bishop of Alatri, serving as co-consecrators. He served as Bishop of Vico Equense until his death on 7 October 1656.

== See also ==
- Catholic Church in Italy

== External links and additional sources ==
- Cheney, David M. "Diocese of Vico Equense". Catholic-Hierarchy.org. (for Chronology of Bishops) ^{[self-published]}
- Chow, Gabriel. "Titular Episcopal See of Vico Equense (Italy)". GCatholic.org. (for Chronology of Bishops) ^{[self-published]}

Catholic Church titles
| Preceded by Alessandro Pauli | Bishop of Vico Equense; 1647–1656 | Succeeded by Giovanni Battista Repucci |
