= Francesco Verde (bishop) =

Italian Roman Catholic prelate (1630–1706)

Most Reverend Francesco Verde
- Bishop of Vico Equense
- Church: Catholic Church
- Diocese: Diocese of Vico Equense
- In office: 1688–1700
- Predecessor: Giovanni Battista Repucci
- Successor: Tommaso d'Aquino

Orders
- Consecration: 20 June 1688 by Stefano Giuseppe Menatti

Personal details
- Born: 1630 San Antonio, Italy
- Died: 21 January 1706 (age 76) Vico Equense, Italy

Francesco Verde (1630 – 21 January 1706) was a Roman Catholic prelate who served as Bishop of Vico Equense (1688–1700).

== Life ==
Verde was born in San Antonio, Italy in 1630. On 19 February 1657, he was appointed during the papacy of Pope Paul V as Bishop of Vico Equense. On 24 February 1657, he was consecrated bishop by Stefano Giuseppe Menatti, Titular Bishop of Cyrene, with Pier Antonio Capobianco, Bishop Emeritus of Lacedonia, and Costanzo Zani, Bishop of Imola, serving as co-consecrators.

He served as Bishop of Vico Equense until his resignation on 19 May 1700. He died on 21 January 1706.

== External links and additional sources ==
- Cheney, David M. "Diocese of Vico Equense". Catholic-Hierarchy.org. (for Chronology of Bishops) ^{[self-published]}
- Chow, Gabriel. "Titular Episcopal See of Vico Equense (Italy)". GCatholic.org. (for Chronology of Bishops) ^{[self-published]}

Catholic Church titles
Preceded by Giovanni Battista Repucci	Bishop of Vico Equense; 1688–1700	Succeeded by Tommaso d'Aquino
