= Tommaso d'Aquino (bishop of Vico Equense) =

Italian Roman Catholic prelate

Most Reverend Tommaso d'Aquino
- Bishop of Vico Equense
- Church: Catholic Church
- Diocese: Diocese of Vico Equense
- In office: 1700–1732
- Predecessor: Francesco Verde
- Successor: Carlo Cosenza

Orders
- Consecration: 24 June 1700 by Pier Matteo Petrucci

Personal details
- Born: 10 September 1657 Caramanico Terme, Italy
- Died: 15 October 1732 (age 75) Vico Equense, Italy

Tommaso d'Aquino, C.R. (10 September 1657 – 15 October 1732) was a Roman Catholic prelate who served as Bishop of Vico Equense (1700–1732).

== Biography ==
Tommaso d'Aquino was born in Caramanico Terme, Italy on 10 September 1657 and ordained a priest in the Congregation of Clerics Regular of the Divine Providence. On 21 June 1700, he was appointed during the papacy of Pope Innocent XII as Bishop of Vico Equense. On 24 June 1700, he was consecrated bishop by Pier Matteo Petrucci, Cardinal-Priest of San Marcello, with Gerolamo Ventimiglia, Bishop of Lipari, and Domenico Belisario de Bellis, Bishop of Molfetta, serving as co-consecrators. He served as Bishop of Vico Equense until his death on 15 October 1732.

== External links and additional sources ==
- Cheney, David M. "Diocese of Vico Equense". Catholic-Hierarchy.org. (for Chronology of Bishops) ^{[self-published]}
- Chow, Gabriel. "Titular Episcopal See of Vico Equense (Italy)". GCatholic.org. (for Chronology of Bishops) ^{[self-published]}

Catholic Church titles
Preceded by Francesco Verde	Bishop of Vico Equense; 1700–1732	Succeeded by Carlo Cosenza
