= Luigi de Franchis =

Italian Roman Catholic prelate

Most Reverend Luigi de Franchis
- Bishop of Nardò
- Church: Catholic Church
- Diocese: Diocese of Nardò
- In office: 1611–1617
- Predecessor: Lelio Landi
- Successor: Girolamo de Franchis
- Previous post: Bishop of Vico Equense (1607–1611)

Personal details
- Died: 1617 Nardò, Italy

Luigi de Franchis, C.R. (died 1617) was a Roman Catholic prelate who served as Bishop of Nardò (1611–1617) and Bishop of Vico Equense (1607–1611).

== Biography ==
Luigi de Franchis was ordained a priest in the Congregation of Clerics Regular of the Divine Providence. On 1 October 1607, he was appointed during the papacy of Pope Paul V as Bishop of Vico Equense. On 24 January 1611, he was appointed during the papacy of Pope Paul V as Bishop of Nardò. He served as Bishop of Nardò until his death in 1617.

== See also ==
- Catholic Church in Italy

== External links and additional sources ==
- Cheney, David M. "Diocese of Vico Equense". Catholic-Hierarchy.org. (for Chronology of Bishops) ^{[self-published]}
- Chow, Gabriel. "Titular Episcopal See of Vico Equense (Italy)". GCatholic.org. (for Chronology of Bishops) ^{[self-published]}
- Cheney, David M. "Diocese of Nardò-Gallipoli". Catholic-Hierarchy.org. (for Chronology of Bishops) ^{[self-published]}
- Chow, Gabriel. "Diocese of Nardò-Gallipoli (Italy)". GCatholic.org.(for Chronology of Bishops) ^{[self-published]}

Catholic Church titles
Preceded by Paolo Regio	Bishop of Vico Equense; 1607–1611	Succeeded by Girolamo Sarriano
Preceded by Lelio Landi	Bishop of Nardò; 1611–1617	Succeeded by Girolamo de Franchis
