= Lelio Landi =

Italian Roman Catholic prelate

Most Reverend Lelio Landi
- Bishop of Nardò
- Church: Catholic Church
- Diocese: Diocese of Nardò
- In office: 1596–1610
- Predecessor: Fabio Fornari
- Successor: Luigi de Franchis

Personal details
- Died: Nardò, Italy

Lelio Landi (died 24 November 1610) was an Italian Roman Catholic prelate who served as Bishop of Nardò (1596–1610).

== Biography ==
On 9 September 1596, Lelio Landi was appointed during the papacy of Pope Clement VIII as Bishop of Nardò. He served as Bishop of Nardò until his death on 24 November 1610.

== External links and additional sources ==
- Cheney, David M. "Diocese of Nardò-Gallipoli". Catholic-Hierarchy.org. (for Chronology of Bishops) ^{[self-published]}
- Chow, Gabriel. "Diocese of Nardò-Gallipoli (Italy)". GCatholic.org.(for Chronology of Bishops) ^{[self-published]}

Catholic Church titles
Preceded by Fabio Fornari	Bishop of Nardò; 1596–1610	Succeeded by Luigi de Franchis
