= Cesare Bovio =

Bishop of Nardò

Most Reverend Cesare Bovio
- Bishop of Nardò
- Church: Catholic Church
- Diocese: Diocese of Nardò
- In office: 1577–1583
- Predecessor: Ambrogio Salvio
- Successor: Fanbio Fornari

Personal details
- Died: 17 January 1583 Nardò, Italy

Cesare Bovio (died 17 Jan 1583) was a Roman Catholic prelate who served as Bishop of Nardò (1577–1583).

== Biography ==
On 15 April 1577, Cesare Bovio was appointed during the papacy of Pope Gregory XIII as Bishop of Nardò. He served as Bishop of Nardò until his death on 17 January 1583.

== External links and additional sources ==
- Cheney, David M. "Diocese of Nardò-Gallipoli". Catholic-Hierarchy.org. (for Chronology of Bishops) ^{[self-published]}
- Chow, Gabriel. "Diocese of Nardò-Gallipoli (Italy)". GCatholic.org.(for Chronology of Bishops) ^{[self-published]}

Catholic Church titles
Preceded by Ambrogio Salvio	Bishop of Nardò; 1577–1583	Succeeded by Fabio Fornari
