= Fornaro =

People with the surname Fornaro include:

- Robert Fornaro, (born 1952) CEO of Spirit Airlines
- Carlo de Fornaro (1872-1949), caricaturist and writer

== See also ==
- Fornari (disambiguation)
