= Giacomo Cattani =

Italian Catholic Cardinal and Archbishop

His Eminence Giacomo Cattani
- Archbishop of Ravenna
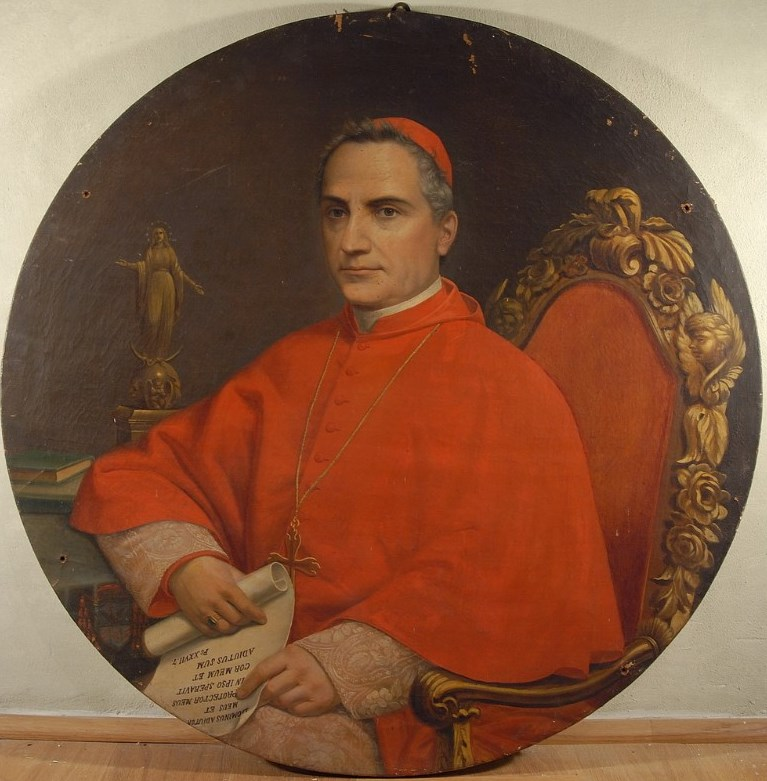
- Church: Roman Catholic Church
- Archdiocese: Ravenna
- See: Ravenna
- Appointed: 22 September 1879
- Installed: 23 March 1880
- Term ended: 14 February 1887
- Predecessor: Vincenzo Moretti
- Successor: Sebastiano Galeati
- Other post: Cardinal-Priest of Santa Balbina (1880-87)
- Previous posts: Apostolic Internuncio to Netherlands (1866-68); Apostolic Nuncio to Belgium (1868-75); Titular Archbishop of Ancyra (1868-79); Secretary of the Congregation of the Council (1875-79); Apostolic Nuncio to Spain (1877-79)

Orders
- Ordination: 20 September 1845
- Consecration: 12 July 1868 by Costantino Patrizi Naro
- Created cardinal: 19 September 1879 by Pope Leo XIII
- Rank: Cardinal-Priest

Personal details
- Born: Giacomo Cattani; 13 January 1823 Brisighella, Papal States
- Died: 14 February 1887 (aged 64) Ravenna, Kingdom of Italy
- Parents: Paolo Cattani; Anna Fabri
- Education: Pontifical Roman Athenaeum Saint Apollinare; Pontifical Academy of Ecclesiastical Nobles

Giacomo Cattani (Brisighella, 13 January 1823 - Ravenna, 14 February 1887) was an Italian Catholic Cardinal and Archbishop.

He was born on 13 January 1823, in Brisighella.

Pope Leo XIII elevated him to the rank of cardinal in the consistory of 19 September 1879. He was Titular Archbishop of Ancyra, Apostolic Nuncio to Belgium, Secretary of the Congregation of the Council, Apostolic Nuncio to Spain, Archbishop of Ravenna, Italy, and Cardinal-Priest of Santa Balbina.

He died on 14 February 1887, in Ravenna.
