= Nardò Cathedral =

Cathedral in Nardò, Italy

Coordinates: 40.1799°N 18.0301°E

Nardò Cathedral (Italian: Duomo di Nardò; Basilica cattedrale di Santa Maria Assunta) is a Roman Catholic cathedral in the town of Nardò, province of Lecce, region of Apulia, Italy, dedicated to the Assumption of the Virgin Mary. Formerly the seat of the bishops of Nardò, since 1986 it has been the episcopal seat of the diocese of Nardò-Gallipoli.

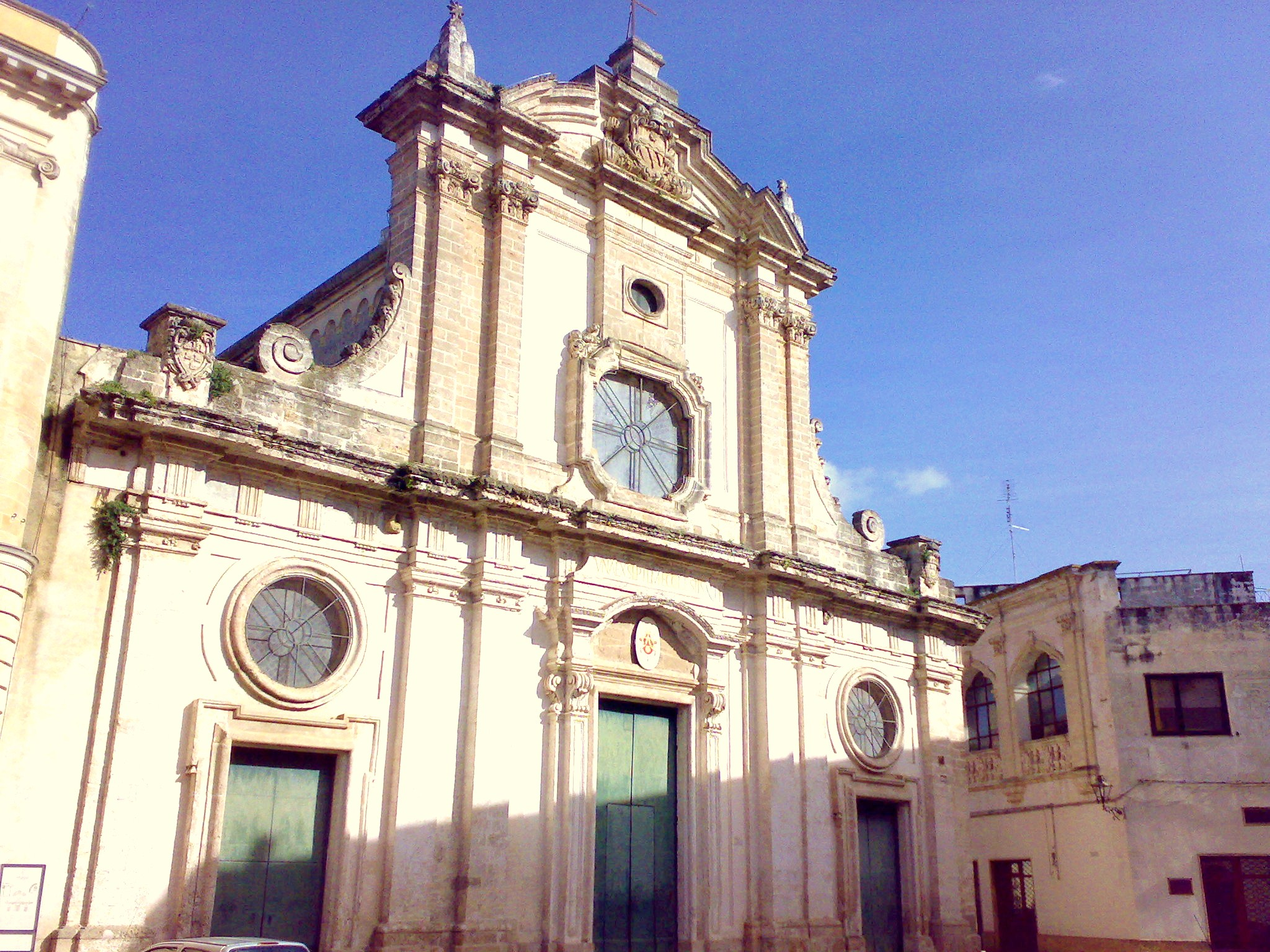
Cathedral façade

== History ==
The present cathedral probably stands on the site of a Byzantine church. In 1080, a church was built here by the conquering Normans, which was elevated to the status of a cathedral in the early 15th century.

The building has undergone a number of refurbishments. The present façade dates to 1710–1725. The interior contains both medieval frescoes and 19th-century frescoes by Cesare Maccari.
