= Roman Catholic Diocese of Vico Equense =

The Diocese of Vico Equense (Latin: Dioecesis Vicanus Aequensis) was a Roman Catholic diocese located in the coastal town of Vico Equense in the Metropolitan City of Naples, in Italy. It was suppressed in 1818 to the Archdiocese of Sorrento. It is now included in the Catholic Church's list of titular sees.

== History ==
- 1050: Established as Diocese of Vico Equense from the Diocese of Sorrento (other sources say the 7th century)
- 1818 Jun 28: Suppressed to the Archdiocese of Sorrento
- 1968: Restored as Titular Episcopal See of Vico Equense

== Ordinaries ==
=== Diocese of Vico Equense ===
Latin name: Vicanus Aequensis
Metropolitan: Archdiocese of Benevento

- Pietro de Andria, O.P. (13 Aug 1307 - )

...

- Salvatore Mosca (11 Oct 1451 - )

...

- Paolo Regio (10 Jan 1583 - 1607 Died)
- Luigi de Franchis, C.R. (1 Oct 1607 - 24 Jan 1611 Appointed, Bishop of Nardò)
- Girolamo Sarriano, C.R. (31 Jan 1611 - 23 Jul 1627 Died)
- Luigi Riccio (20 Dec 1627 - 6 Jan 1643 Died)
- Alessandro Pauli (23 Feb 1643 - 23 Jul 1645 Died)
- Tommaso Imperato (27 May 1647 - 7 Oct 1656 Died)
- Giovanni Battista Repucci (19 Feb 1657 - Feb 1688 Died)
- Francesco Verde (14 Jan 1688 - 19 May 1700 Resigned)
- Tommaso d'Aquino, C.R. (21 Jun 1700 - 15 Oct 1732 Died)
- Carlo Cosenza (19 Dec 1732 - 28 May 1743 Died)
- Alfonso Sozi Carafa, C.R.S. (15 Jul 1743 - 15 Nov 1751 Appointed, Bishop of Lecce)
- Vito Antonio Mastandrea (15 Nov 1751 - 13 Feb 1773 Died)
- Paolino Pace (10 May 1773 - 14 Apr 1792 Died)
- Michele Natale (18 Dec 1797 Confirmed - 20 Aug 1799 Died)

1818: Suppressed to the Archdiocese of Sorrento
