= Giacomo Merizzi =

Italian Roman Catholic archbishop (1834–1916)

Giacomo Merizzi (Tirano, 15 August 1834 – Tirano, 22 March 1916) was an Italian Roman Catholic archbishop.

== Biography ==
Already capitular vicar of the Diocese of Como, on 14 December 1891 he was elected bishop of Vigevano.

In the diocese of industrial development, he promoted the festival speakers, while Canon Clerici established the Leone XIII boarding school. He took special care of the seminary, reforming his studies and increasing the library. It also gave impetus to the Sacred Music Commission. He favored the charitable initiatives of the parish priests of the diocese, who in those years founded numerous institutes of assistance. He devoted himself with commitment to pastoral visits.

In 1898 he was relieved of the responsibility of the diocese and retired to Tirano for health reasons.

On 28 November 1898 he was appointed Titular Archbishop of Ancyra and on 21 August 1902, archbishop of Mocisso.
