= Giovanni Battista Capano =

18th-century Roman Catholic bishop

Most Reverend Giovanni Battista Capano
- Bishop of Bitonto
- Church: Catholic Church
- Diocese: Diocese of Bitonto
- In office: 1700–1720
- Predecessor: Carlo de Ferrari
- Successor: Domenico Maria Cedronio

Orders
- Consecration: 24 June 1700 by Pier Matteo Petrucci

Personal details
- Born: 28 November 1659 Naples, Italy
- Died: 14 January 1720 (aged 60)

Giovanni Battista Capano, C.R. (1659–1720) was a Roman Catholic prelate who served as Bishop of Bitonto (1700–1720).

== Biography ==
Giovanni Battista Capano was born in Naples, Italy and ordained a priest in the Congregation of Clerics Regular of the Divine Providence. On 21 June 1700, he was appointed during the papacy of Pope Innocent XII as Bishop of Bitonto, On 24 June 1700, he was consecrated bishop by Pier Matteo Petrucci, Cardinal-Priest of San Marcello, with Gerolamo Ventimiglia, Bishop of Lipari, and Domenico Belisario de Bellis, Bishop of Molfetta. He served as Bishop of Bitonto until his death on 14 January 1720.

== External links and additional sources ==
- Cheney, David M. "Diocese of Bitonto". Catholic-Hierarchy.org. (for Chronology of Bishops) ^{[self-published]}
- Chow, Gabriel. "Diocese of Bitonto (Italy)". GCatholic.org. (for Chronology of Bishops) ^{[self-published]}

Catholic Church titles
Preceded by Carlo de Ferrari	Bishop of Bitonto; 1700–1720	Succeeded by Domenico Maria Cedronio
