= Fernand Palma d'Artois =

Most Reverend Fernand Palma d'Artois
- Vicar Apostolic of Great Mogul; Titular Archbishop of Ancyra
- Church: Roman Catholic Church
- In office: 1696–1701
- Successor: Raimondo Gallani

Orders
- Consecration: 16 September 1696 by Domenico Belisario de Bellis

Personal details
- Born: 2 January 1623 Naples, Italy
- Died: 3 January 1701 (age 78)

Fernand Palma d'Artois, OCD (1623–1701) was a Roman Catholic prelate who served as Vicar Apostolic of Great Mogul (1696–1701) and Titular Archbishop of Ancyra (1696–1701).

== Biography ==
Fernand Palma d'Artois was born on 2 January 1623 in Naples, Italy and ordained a priest in the Order of Discalced Carmelites. In September 1696, he was appointed during the papacy of Pope Innocent XII as Titular Archbishop of Ancyra. On 16 September 1696, he was consecrated bishop by Domenico Belisario de Bellis, Bishop of Molfetta, with serving as co-consecrators. On 20 September 1696, he was appointed during the papacy of Pope Innocent XII as Vicar Apostolic of Great Mogul. He served as Vicar Apostolic of Great Mogul until his death on 3 January 1701.

== External links and additional sources ==
- Cheney, David M. "Archdiocese of Bombay". Catholic-Hierarchy.org. (for Chronology of Bishops) ^{[self-published]}
- Chow, Gabriel. "Metropolitan Archdiocese of Bombay (India)". GCatholic.org. (for Chronology of Bishops) ^{[self-published]}

Catholic Church titles
Preceded by	Titular Archbishop of Ancyra; 1696–1701	Succeeded by Raimondo Gallani
Preceded by Custodio do Pinho	Vicar Apostolic of Great Mogul; 1696–1701	Succeeded by Giovanni Maria de Leonardi
