= Oreste Giorgi =

His Eminence Oreste Giorgi
- Major Penitentiary of the Apostolic Penitentiary
- Church: Roman Catholic Church
- Appointed: 12 March 1918
- Term ended: 30 December 1924
- Predecessor: Wilhelmus Marinus van Rossum
- Successor: Andreas Franz Früehwirth
- Other post: Cardinal-Priest of Santa Maria in Cosmedin pro hac vice (1923–24)
- Previous posts: Undersecretary of the Congregation for Religious (1907–11); Secretary of the Congregation of the Council (1911–16); Cardinal-Deacon of Santa Maria in Cosmedin (1916–23); Titular Archbishop of Ancyra (1924)

Orders
- Ordination: 21 December 1878 by Raffaele Monaco La Valletta
- Consecration: 27 April 1924 by Pope Pius XI
- Created cardinal: 4 December 1916 by Pope Benedict XV
- Rank: Cardinal-Deacon (1916–23); Cardinal-Priest (1923–24)

Personal details
- Born: Oreste Giorgi; 19 May 1856 Valmontone, Segni, Papal States
- Died: 30 December 1924 (aged 68) Palazzo Altemps, Rome, Kingdom of Italy
- Education: Pontifical Roman Seminary
- Coat of arms

Styles of Oreste Giorgi
- Reference style: His Eminence
- Spoken style: Your Eminence
- Informal style: Cardinal
- See: Ancira (titular see)

Oreste Giorgi (19 May 1856 – 30 December 1924) was a Cardinal of the Roman Catholic Church and was former Major Penitentiary of Apostolic Penitentiary.

== Early life and priesthood ==
Oreste Giorgi was born in Valmontone, Italy. He was educated at the Pontifical Roman Seminary, Rome.

He was ordained to the priesthood on 21 December 1878. He served as a faculty member of the Roman College, from 1879 to 1891. He also served as an official at the Apostolic Penitentiary from December 1891. He was created Privy chamberlain supra numerum on 9 February 1897. He was raised to the level of Domestic prelate of His Holiness on 8 October 1903 and finally to the level of Protonotary apostolic on 5 November 1903. He was the undersecretary of the Congregation for Bishops from 3 June 1907 as well as his duties at the congregation he was an Auditor of the Roman Rota. He was appointed as the Secretary of the Congregation of the Council on 7 December 1911.

== Cardinalate ==
He was created and proclaimed Cardinal-Deacon of Santa Maria in Cosmedin by Pope Benedict XV in the consistory of 4 December 1916. He was appointed as Major Penitentiary on 12 March 1918. He participated in the conclave of 1922 that elected Pope Pius XI. He opted for the order of cardinal priests and his deaconry was elevated pro hac vice to title on 25 May 1923.

== Episcopate ==
He was appointed titular archbishop of Ancyra on 26 April 1924 and was consecrated the next day in the Sistine Chapel by Pope Pius. He died in 1924 and is buried in the tomb of his family in the collegiate church, Valmontone.

== Legacy ==
A school in Rome is named after him.

Catholic Church titles
Preceded by Willem Marinus van Rossum	Major Penitentiary of Apostolic Penitentiary; 12 March 1918 – 30 December 1924	Succeeded by Andreas Franz Frühwirth
