= Vico Equense railway station =

Railway station in Vico Equense, Naples, Italy

Vico Equense
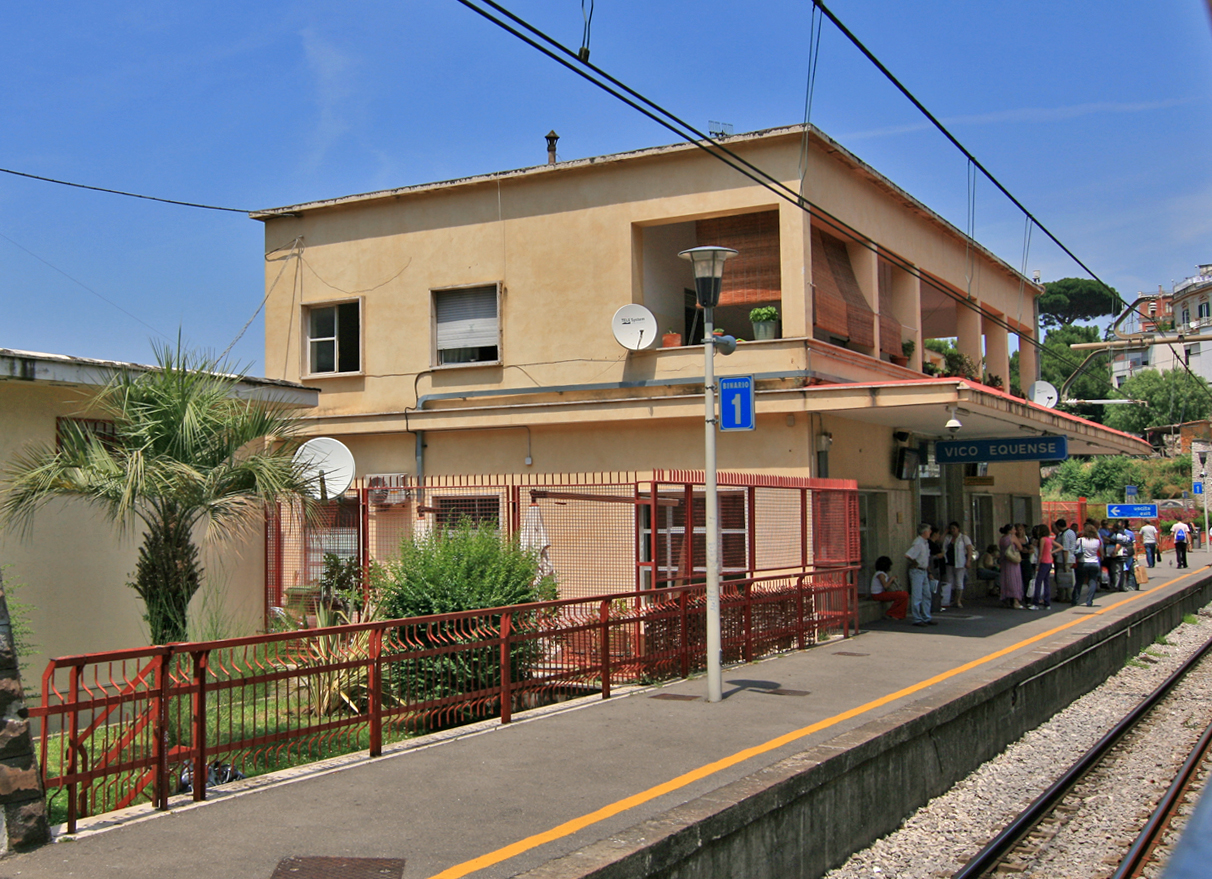

General information
- Location: Corso Filangieri, Vico Equense 80069 NA; Vico Equense, Metropolitan City of Naples, Campania; Italy
- Coordinates: 40°39′46.44″N 14°25′47.28″E
- Line: Circumvesuviana Naples-Sorrento line
- Train operators: EAV

History
- Opened: 6 January 1948; 78 years ago

Services
Preceding station	Circumvesuviana	Following station
Castellammare di Stabia towards Napoli Porta Nolana	Naples-Sorrento line	Seiano towards Sorrento
Location
- Location within Campania Location within Italy

Vico Equense railway station is a railway station in Vico Equense, Metropolitan City of Naples, Italy. It is served by the Naples-Sorrento line of Circumvesuviana railway network, managed by EAV.

== History ==
It was opened to the public on 6 January 1948.

== Station layout ==
The station consists of three through tracks, although the third is currently out of service and used only for train maintenance. It is located between two tunnels.

== Passenger movement ==
All trains to both Naples Porta Nolana and Sorrento stop at the station. Passenger traffic is consistently high, due not only to regular commuter use but also to the presence of tourists.

== Connections ==
- Bus stop

== See also ==
- List of railway stations in Campania
