= Girolamo de Franchis =

17th-century Catholic bishop

Most Reverend Girolamo de Franchis
- Archbishop of Capua
- Church: Catholic Church
- In office: 1634–1635
- Predecessor: Girolamo Costanzo
- Successor: Camillo Melzi
- Previous post: Bishop of Nardò (1617–1634)

Orders
- Consecration: 26 November 1617 by Ladislao d'Aquino

Personal details
- Born: 1581 Naples, Italy
- Died: January 1635 (age 54) Capua, Italy

Girolamo de Franchis (1581 – January 1635) was a Roman Catholic prelate who served as Bishop of Nardò (1617–1634) and Archbishop of Capua (1634–1635).

== Biography ==
Girolamo de Franchis was born in Naples, Italy in 1581. On 13 November 1617, he was appointed during the papacy of Pope Paul V as Bishop of Nardò. On 26 November 1617, he was consecrated bishop by Ladislao d'Aquino, Bishop of Venafro, with Antonio d'Aquino, Bishop of Sarno, and Innico Siscara, Bishop of Anglona-Tursi, serving as co-consecrators. On 27 November 1634, he was appointed during the papacy of Pope Urban VIII as Archbishop of Capua. He served as Archbishop of Capua until his death in January 1635.

While bishop, Franchis was the principal co-consecrator of Placido Padiglia, Bishop of Lavello (1627).

== External links and additional sources ==
- Cheney, David M. "Diocese of Nardò-Gallipoli". Catholic-Hierarchy.org. (for Chronology of Bishops) ^{[self-published]}
- Chow, Gabriel. "Diocese of Nardò-Gallipoli (Italy)". GCatholic.org.(for Chronology of Bishops) ^{[self-published]}
- Cheney, David M. "Archdiocese of Capua". Catholic-Hierarchy.org. (for Chronology of Bishops) ^{[self-published]}
- Chow, Gabriel. "Archdiocese of Capua (Italy)". GCatholic.org. (for Chronology of Bishops) ^{[self-published]}

Catholic Church titles
Preceded by Luigi de Franchis	Bishop of Nardò; 1617–1634	Succeeded by Fabio Chigi
Preceded by Girolamo Costanzo	Archbishop of Capua; 1634–1635	Succeeded by Camillo Melzi
