= Giulio Vaccaro =

Italian archbishop

Giulio Vaccaro (10 April 1851 in Naples - 10 March 1924 in Bari) was an Italian Catholic archbishop.

== Biography ==
Doctor in sacred theology and canon law, for many years he was vicar general of the diocese of Nusco. On 4 June 1891, just forty years old, he was named bishop of Trivento.

On 6 December 1896, he left Trivento's seat to become the coadjutor of then Archbishop of Trani Domenico Marinangeli. At the same time, Ancyra's archbishop's seat was assigned to him.

With the Pontifical Bubble of 24 March 1898, he was appointed Archbishop of the Archdiocese of Bari and Canosa and made his entry into Bari on 5 June the same year, after having taken over the office by proxy.

During his long stay in Bari, he carried out intensive pastoral activity, constantly urging the clergy and the faithful to work in the educational and social field. He addressed many diocesan letters to the diocese, from which his whole commitment was directed, especially to promote vocations, to spread religious education, and to lead a morally healthy life. From 1902 to 1912 he promoted several congresses, concretizing spiritual and social initiatives throughout the whole of Apulia. He contributed to the erection in Bari of a civilian hospital by donating a 200,000 lire contribution and subsidized families affected by the floods that fell on the city from 1905 to 1915.

In 1907, he received a pastoral visit from Father Ernesto Bresciani, who noted the ignorance in the religious field, the spread of immorality, the favor met by modernism among young priests. For this reason, he later showed much more firmness in exerting the presence of priests in the "Congregations of the moral cases", also imposing heavy penalties for absences.

One of his greatest merits is the decoration of the cathedral, including the refurbishment of the floor, the provision of an organ that was his personal gift, the restoration of the dome. During the execution of the work, unknown thieves robbed the painting of Our Lady of Constantinople some precious objects, which the faithful hurried to replace with generous offers. He established new town parishes, such as St. Joseph, Carmel, Santa Cecilia, Redentore, San Pasquale, SS. Sacramento, and St. James, in addition to the various other buildings in the centers near the capital. When the Archbishop's seminary was repaired at his expense, he made efforts to erect the regional seminary.

He died on 10 March 1924 and was buried in the chapel of the metropolitan chapter in the cemetery of Bari. On 5 November 1939 the body was transferred from the town cemetery to the church of San Giuseppe in the Madonnella district, where a monument was erected in his honor. A road that leads from the church of St. Joseph to the Lungomare is still dedicated to him.

== See also ==
- Luisa Piccarreta
