= Diocese of Nardò-Gallipoli =

Diocese of the Catholic Church in Italy

Coordinates: 40.1833°N 18.0333°E

Diocese of Nardò-Gallipoli Dioecesis Neritonensis-Gallipolitana

Catholic
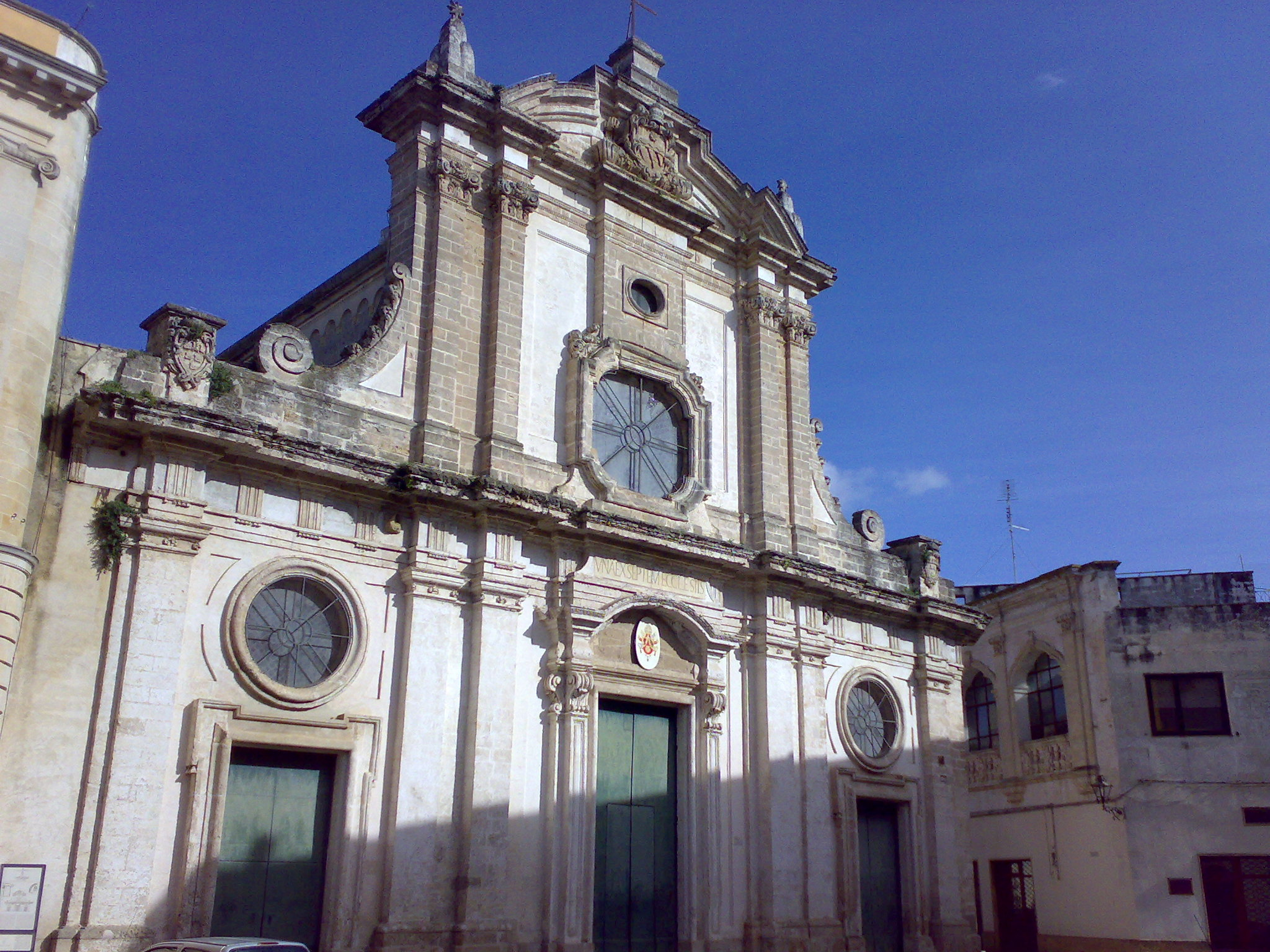
- Nardò Cathedral

Location
- Country: Italy
- Ecclesiastical province: Lecce

Statistics
- Area: 587 km^{2} (227 sq mi)
- Population: Total; Catholics: (as of 2016); 208,187; 207,130 (99.5%)
- Parishes: 66

Information
- Denomination: Catholic Church
- Rite: Roman Rite
- Established: 13 January 1413 (613 years ago)
- Cathedral: Basilica Cattedrale di S. Maria Assunta
- Co-cathedral: Basilica Concattedrale di S. Agata Vergine
- Secular priests: 127 (diocesan); 14 (Religious Orders); 14 Permanent Deacons

Current leadership
- Pope: Leo XIV
- Bishop: Fernando Filograna

Website
- www.diocesinardogallipoli.it

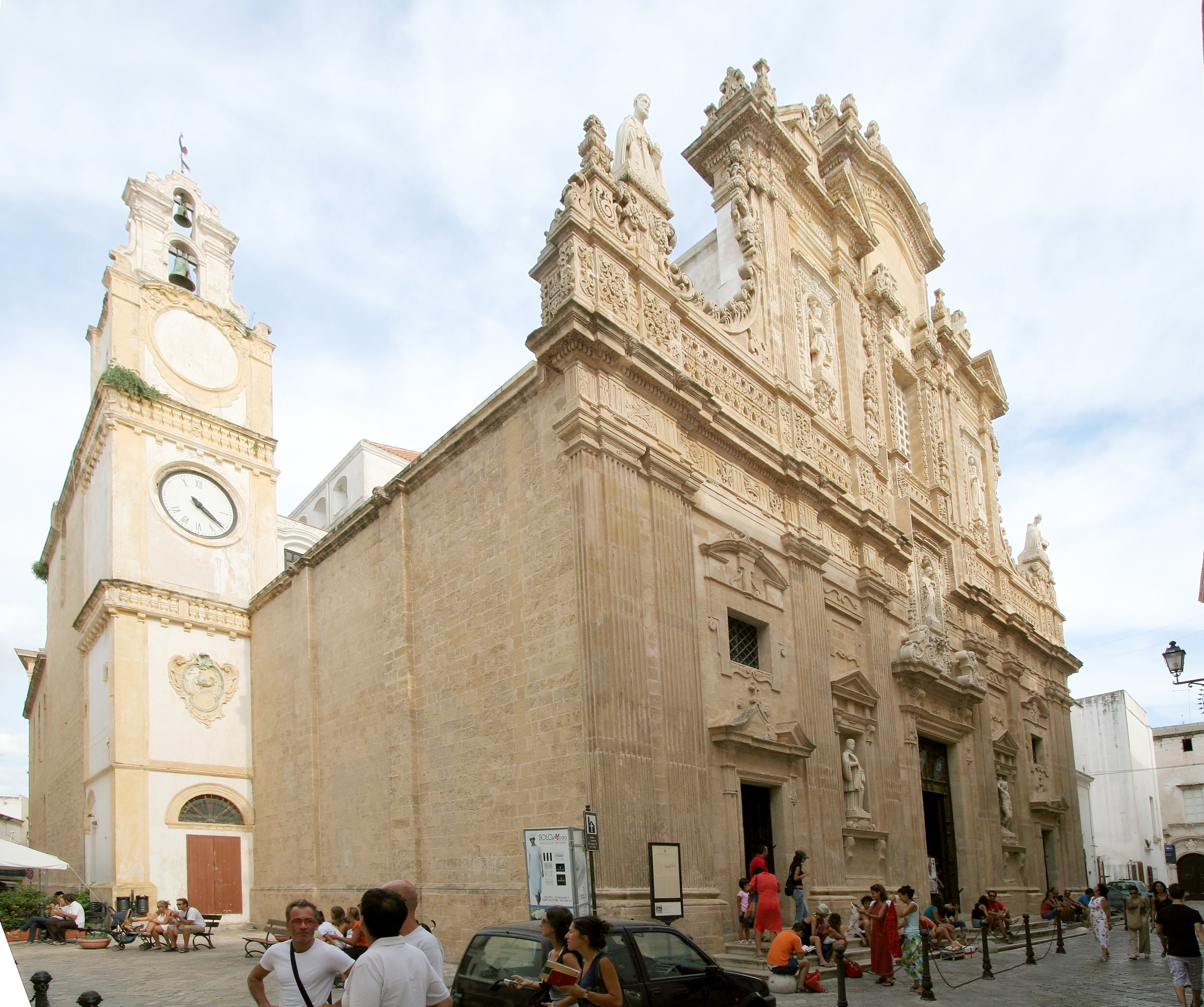
The Gallipoli Cathedral

The Diocese of Nardò-Gallipoli (Latin: Dioecesis Neritonensis-Gallipolitana) is a Latin diocese of the Catholic Church in southern Italy. The diocese of Nardò was established in 1413. It is now a suffragan of the Archdiocese of Lecce.

== History ==
=== Western Schism and new diocese ===
In 1378, a contested papal election produced a schism in the Church. All of the cardinals and much of the Church supported Cardinal Robert of Geneva, who took the name Clement VII, and who soon returned with the papal Curia to Avignon. The rest supported the Neapolitan Bartolomeo Prignano, who took the name Urban VI. Initially the Kingdom of Naples supported Pope Clement, who chose to create a new diocese at Nardò. On 15 November 1379, the new bishop, the Sicilian Matteo de Castiello, arrived in Nardò to a decidedly mixed reception. His instructions were to make the monastery of S. Maria his cathedral and residence, and he therefore removed Abbot Guglielmo from governance over the territory of Nardò. Bishop Matteo was expelled in 1401 and the diocese of the Avignon Obedience suppressed, following a change in allegiance of the Kingdom of Naples after the death of Urban VI. A new abbot was elected in the person of Antonio de Perugia, who had been Archpriest of the cathedral. Abbot Antonio died in 1406, and was succeeded by Abbot Desiderius. Desiderius died on 27 July 1412, and on 22 July Giovanni de Epifanis succeed him.

=== Diocese of the Roman obedience ===
On 13 January 1413, the Diocese of Nardò was established, and made immediately subject to the Holy See (Papacy). The abbot of S. Maria was deposed, and S. Maria again became a cathedral. Its first bishop was appointed by Pope John XXIII on the same day. He was Giovanni de Epifanis, who had just been deposed as abbot of S. Maria di Nardò.

A very great earthquake struck the area of Nardò on 5 December 1456, severely damaging the cathedral and causing the bell tower to collapse. On 20 February 1743, another major earthquake struck, bringing major damage to the Palazzo civico and the churches of S. Michele Arcangelo, S. Antonio da Padova, S. Gregorio Armeno, S. Domenico, and S. Francesco d'Assisi.

=== Chapter and cathedral ===
The cathedral is administered by a Chapter. In 1617, the Chapter consisted of five dignities and twenty Canons. In 1669, the Chapter was composed of six dignities and nineteen Canons. The Chapter is currently (2019) headed by the Archpriest, with seven additional Canons, one of whom is the Penitentiary. The co-cathedral of S. Agata at Gallipoli is headed by the Primicerius-Theologus, and has a Cantor and one other member.

In 1647, during the rebellions against Spanish rule in the Kingdom of Naples, the Count of Conversano captured Nardò and executed four of the Canons of the cathedral Chapter.

==== Synods ====
Synods of unknown dates were held by Bishop Giovanni Battista Acquaviva (1536–1569) and by Bishop Fabio Fornari (1583–1596). Bishop Girolamo de Franchis (1617–1634) held a diocesan synod in 1619; he held five other synods. At some point between 1652 and 1654, Bishop Calanio della Ciaja (1652–1654) held a diocesan synod. A synod was held by Bishop Tommaso Brancaccio (1669–1677) in 1674. Bishop Orazio Fortunato (1678–1707) presided over a diocesan synod on 11 June 1680.

=== Twentieth century changes ===
Following the Second Vatican Council, and in accordance with the norms laid out in the Council's decree, Christus Dominus chapter 40, the Episcopal Conference of Apulia petitioned the Holy See (Pope) that Lecce be made a metropolitan and that a new ecclesiastical province be created. After wide consultations among all affected parties, Pope John Paul II issued a decree on 20 October 1980, elevating Lecce to the status of metropolitan see. He also created the new ecclesiastical province of Lecce, whose constituent bishoprics (suffragans) were to be: Brindisi (no longer a metropolitanate, though the archbishop allowed to retain the title of archbishop), Otranto (no longer a metropolitanate, though the archbishop allowed to retain the title of archbishop), Gallipoli, Nardò, Ostuno, and Uxentina-S. Mariae Leucadensis (Ugento).

On 18 February 1984, the Vatican and the Italian State signed a new and revised concordat, which was accompanied in the next year by enabling legislation. According to the agreement, the practice of having one bishop govern two separate dioceses at the same time, aeque personaliter, was abolished. Otherwise Nardò and Gallipoli might have shared a bishop, as the Bishop of Nardo e Gallipoli. Instead, the Vatican continued consultations which had begun under Pope John XXIII for the merging of small dioceses, especially those with personnel and financial problems, into one combined diocese. On 30 September 1986, Pope John Paul II ordered that the dioceses of Nardò and Gallipoli be merged into one diocese with one bishop, with the Latin title Dioecesis Neritonensis-Gallipolitana. The seat of the diocese was to be in Nardò, and the cathedral of Nardò was to serve as the cathedral of the merged diocese. The cathedral in Galllipoli was to become a co-cathedral, and the cathedral Chapter was to be a Capitulum Concathedralis. There was to be only one diocesan Tribunal, in Nardò, and likewise one seminary, one College of Consultors, and one Priests' Council. The territory of the new diocese was to include the territory of the former dioceses of Nardò and of Gallipoli.

== Bishops of Nardò ==
=== to 1700 ===
- Matthaeus (1387–1401) (Avignon Obedience)

...

- Joannes de Epiphaniis (1413–1423)
- Joannes Barella, O.Min. (1423–1435)
- Stephanus Agrinelli de Pendinellis (1436–1451)
- Ludovicus de Pinnis (1451–1483)
- Ludovicus de Justinis (1483–1491)
- Gabriele Setario (1491–1507)
- Antonio de Caro (1507–1517)

Cardinal Luigi d'Aragona (1517–1519) Administrator
Cardinal Marco Cornaro (1519–1521) Administrator

- Giacomo Antonio Acquaviva (1521–1532) Bishop-elect

Cardinal Giovanni Domenico de Cupis (1532–1536) Administrator

- Giovanni Battista Acquaviva (1536–1569)
- Ambrogio Salvio, O.P. (1569–1577)
- Cesare Bovio (15 Apr 1577 – 17 Jan 1583 Died)
- Fabio Fornari (9 Mar 1583 – 20 Feb 1596 Died)
- Lelio Landi (1596–1610)
- Luigi de Franchis, C.R. (1611–1617)
- Girolamo de Franchis (1617–1634)
- Fabio Chigi (1635–1652)
- Calanio della Ciaja (1 Jul 1652 –1654)
- Girolamo Cori (de Coris) (1656–1669)
- Tommaso Brancaccio (1669–1677)
- Orazio Fortunato (1678–1707)

=== 1700 to 1994 ===
- Antonio Sanfelice (28 Nov 1707 – 1 Jan 1736 Died)
- Francesco Carafa (11 Apr 1736 –1754)
- Marco Aurelio Petruccelli (16 Dec 1754 – 18 Nov 1782 Died)
- Carmine Fimiani (27 Feb 1792 Confirmed – 13 Nov 1799 Died)

Sede vacante (1799–1819)

- Leopoldo Corigliano (4 Jun 1819 Confirmed – 15 Dec 1824 Resigned)
- Salvatore Lettieri (1825–1839)
- Angelo Filipponi (27 Jan 1842 Confirmed – 16 Aug 1845 Resigned)
- Ferdinando Girardi, C.M. (21 Dec 1846 Confirmed –1848
- Luigi Vetta (20 Apr 1849 Confirmed – 10 Feb 1873 Died)
- Salvatore Nappi (1873–1876 Resigned)
- Michele Mautone (18 Dec 1876 – 17 Feb 1888 Died)
- Giuseppe Ricciardi (1 Jun 1888 – 18 Jun 1908 Died)
- Nicola Giannattasio (30 Nov 1908 – 24 Jun 1926 Resigned)
- Gaetano Müller (13 Aug 1927 – 8 Feb 1935 Died)
- Nicola Colangelo (16 Dec 1935 – 25 Jun 1937 Died)
- Gennaro Fenizia (17 Aug 1938 – 21 Jul 1948 Appointed, Bishop of Cava e Sarno)
- Francesco Minerva (16 Sep 1948 –1950
- Corrado Ursi (1951–1961)
- Antonio Rosario Mennonna (22 Feb 1962 – 30 Sep 1983 Retired)
- Aldo Garzia (30 Sep 1983 Succeeded – 17 Dec 1994 Died)

Bishops of Nardò-Gallipoli

- Vittorio Fusco (12 Sep 1995 – 11 Jul 1999 Died)
- Domenico Caliandro (13 May 2000 – 20 Oct 2012 Appointed, Archbishop of Brindisi-Ostuni)
- Fernando Tarcisio Filograna (16 Jul 2013 Appointed – )

== Bibliography ==
=== Reference for bishops ===
- Gams, Pius Bonifatius (1873). Series episcoporum Ecclesiae catholicae: quotquot innotuerunt a beato Petro apostolo (in Latin). Ratisbon: Typis et Sumptibus Georgii Josephi Manz. pp. 902–903.
- Eubel, Conradus, ed. (1913). Hierarchia catholica (in Latin). Vol. Tomus 1 (second ed.). Münster: Libreria Regensbergiana.
- Eubel, Conradus, ed. (1914). Hierarchia catholica (in Latin). Vol. Tomus 2 (second ed.). Münster: Libreria Regensbergiana.
- Gulik, Guilelmus (1923). Eubel, Conradus (ed.). Hierarchia catholica (in Latin). Vol. Tomus 3 (second ed.). Münster: Libreria Regensbergiana.
- Gauchat, Patritius (Patrice) (1935). Hierarchia catholica (in Latin). Vol. Tomus IV (1592-1667). Münster: Libraria Regensbergiana.
- Ritzler, Remigius; Sefrin, Pirminus (1952). Hierarchia catholica medii et recentis aevi V (1667-1730). Patavii: Messagero di S. Antonio.
- Ritzler, Remigius; Sefrin, Pirminus (1958). Hierarchia catholica medii et recentis aevi (in Latin). Vol. Tomus VI (1730-1799). Patavii: Messagero di S. Antonio.
- Ritzler, Remigius; Sefrin, Pirminus (1968). Hierarchia Catholica medii et recentioris aevi sive summorum pontificum, S. R. E. cardinalium, ecclesiarum antistitum series... A pontificatu Pii PP. VII (1800) usque ad pontificatum Gregorii PP. XVI (1846) (in Latin). Vol. VII. Monasterii: Libr. Regensburgiana.
- Remigius Ritzler; Pirminus Sefrin (1978). Hierarchia catholica Medii et recentioris aevi... A Pontificatu PII PP. IX (1846) usque ad Pontificatum Leonis PP. XIII (1903) (in Latin). Vol. VIII. Il Messaggero di S. Antonio.
- Pięta, Zenon (2002). Hierarchia catholica medii et recentioris aevi... A pontificatu Pii PP. X (1903) usque ad pontificatum Benedictii PP. XV (1922) (in Latin). Vol. IX. Padua: Messagero di San Antonio. ISBN 978-88-250-1000-8.

=== Studies ===
- Cappelletti, Giuseppe (1870). Le chiese d'Italia dalla loro origine sino ai nostri giorni (in Italian). Vol. Tomo vigesimo primo (21). Venezia: G. Antonelli. pp. 463–469.
- Lombardi, Tommaso (1848), "Nardò", in: Vincenzo D'Avino (1848). Cenni storici sulle chiese arcivescovili, vescovili, e prelatizie (nulluis) del Regno delle Due Sicilie (in Italian). Napoli: dalle stampe di Ranucci. pp. 433-450.
- Mazzarella, Emilio (1972). Le sede vescovile di Nardò: (Dall'origine ai nostri giorni) (in Italian). Calatina: Editrice salentina.
- Ughelli, Ferdinando; Coleti, Niccolò (1717). Italia sacra, sive De Episcopis Italiae (in Latin). Vol. Tomus primus (secunda ed.). Venice: apud Sebastianum Coleti. pp. 1035–1063.
- Ughelli, Ferdinando; Coleti, Niccolò (1722). Italia sacra, sive De episcopis Italiæ, et insularum adjacentium (in Latin). Vol. Tomus decimus (10) (secunda ed.). Venice: apud Sebastianum Coleti. pp. 291–302.
