= Domus Internationalis Paulus VI =

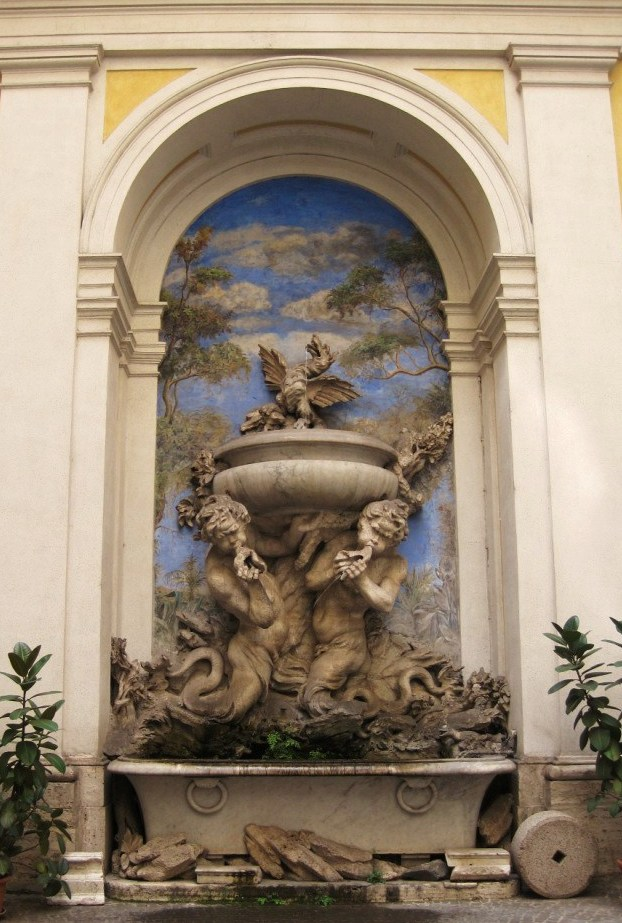
- Fountain at the main courtyard of Domus Paulus VI, Rome, Italy. Work of the School of Bernini.

General information
- Type: Residence, guesthouse
- Architectural style: Renaissance
- Location: Historical Center, Rome, Italy
- Current tenants: Officials of the Roman Curia
- Groundbreaking: 15th Century A.D.
- Owner: Holy See (Vatican City State)

The Domus Internationalis Paulus VI was established as a Foundation by Pope John Paul II on 6 January 1999. The purpose of the Domus is to accommodate clergy who are assigned to the diplomatic service of the Holy See, or who are officials of the Roman Curia. The Domus is at the Southern wing of the Palazzi di S. Apollinare. It is a historic Palazzo located in the ancient centre of Rome, and one of the four residences of the Officials of the Roman Curia in Rome; the other three are Domus Sanctae Marthae within the Vatican Walls, the Casa San Benedetto (the retirement home of Papal Nuncios) at via dell'Erba, and the Domus Romana Sacerdotalis at via Traspontina. The last two are located near the St. Peter's Square. Cardinals, bishops and priests who visit the Pope in Rome or who participate in the various apostolic works of the Holy See also stay at the Domus. The Domus is near the Vatican, notable Roman monuments, and famous sights.

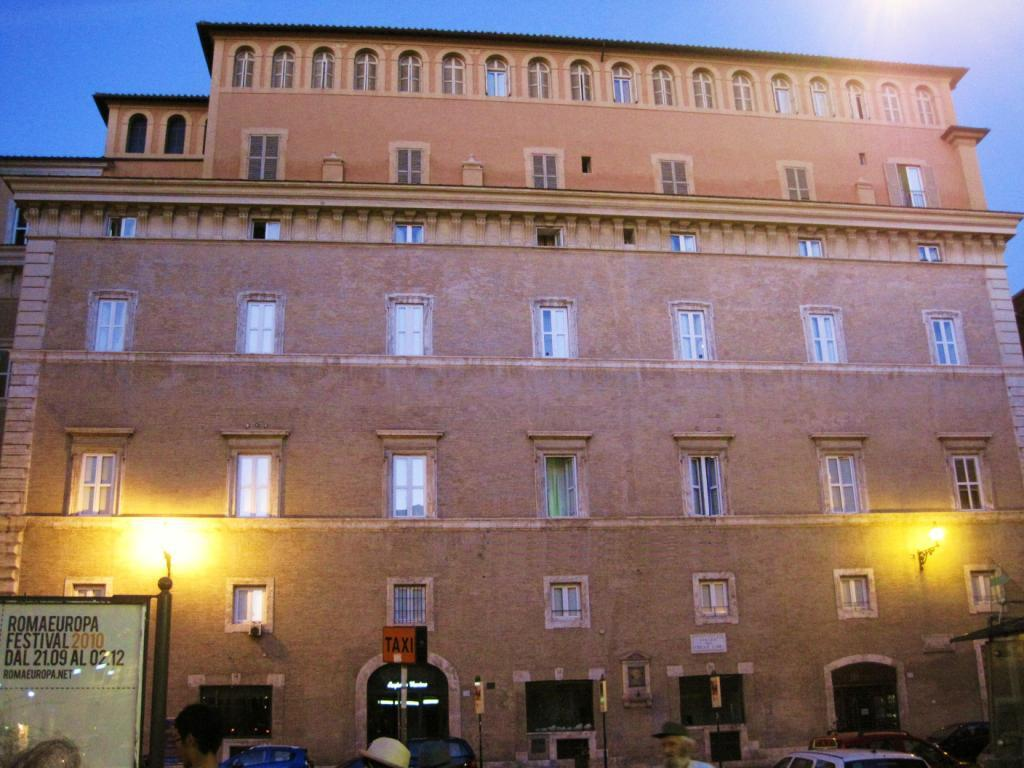
Domus Internationalis Paulus VI as seen from Piazza Cinque Lune

== History of the Palazzo ==
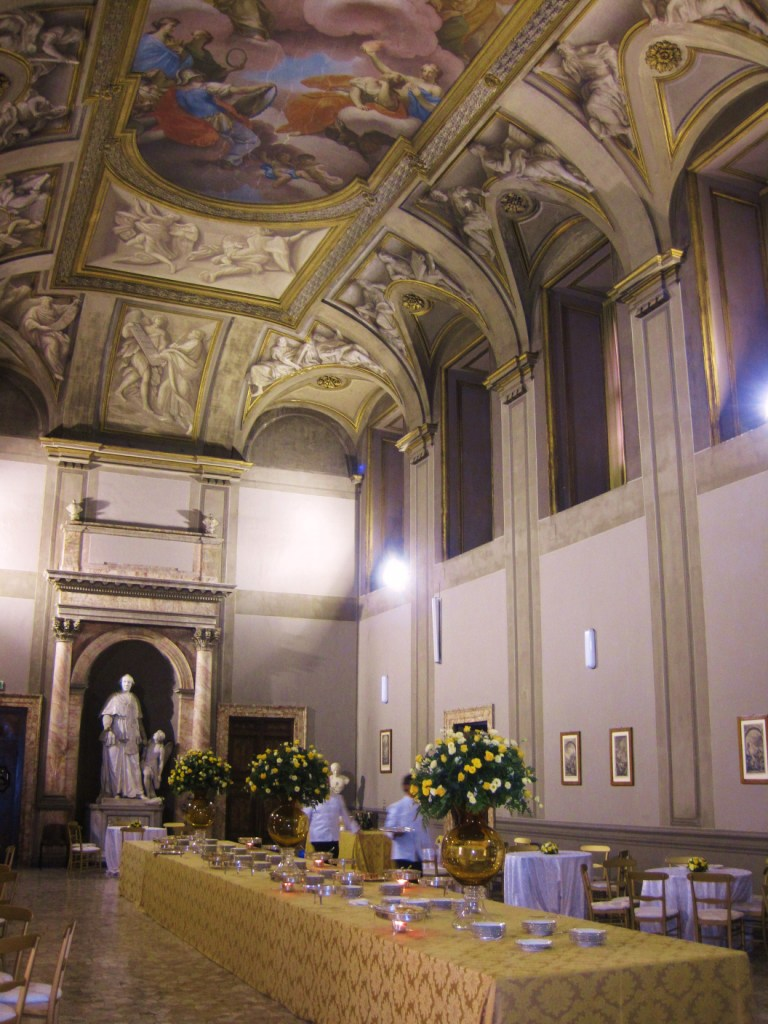
Sala Braschi, named after Pius VI (Giovanni Angelico Cardinal Braschi), Pope from 25 December 1717 to 29 August 1799. Residents recount that this is where Wolfgang Amadeus Mozart's father introduced him to prospective patrons in the Papal Court.

The original structure of the complex was constructed in the 15th century. In 1573, the palazzo on the site that the present Domus occupies became the seat of the Germanic College, founded by Saint Ignatius of Loyola (1491-1556) and approved by Pope Julius III in 1552. In 1580, Pope Gregory XIII united the college with the Hungarian Institute, which he had founded, thus establishing the Collegium Germanicum et Hungaricum, which was entrusted to the care of the Jesuits.

In 1634, the original building was demolished and a new edifice was constructed under the direction of the Italian Baroque architect, Paolo Marucelli (1596-1649). The façade of the Palazzo looked on to Via S. Agostino and was joined to the Palazzo Apollinare by an archway above the street.

Following construction on the nearby palazzo of San Luigi dei Francesi, another section of the palazzo was demolished. This allowed for a new design and consequent expansion of the building with the new façade on Via della Scrofa. This was done in 1776 under the direction of the Roman architects Pietro Camporese il Vecchio (1726-1781) and Pasquale Belli (1752-1833). The renovated palazzo was delimited by Via S. Agostino, Via della Scrofa, Via S. Giovanna d'Arco and Piazza delle Cinque Lune. The connecting archway above Via S. Agostino was retained.

In July 1773 the Society of Jesus was suppressed, and the German College was subsequently placed under the care of diocesan clergy until 1789, at which time it was closed and transferred to Ferrara (Emilia-Romagna). The Palazzo then became the seat of the Vicariate of Rome.

During the pontificate of Leo XII (1823-1829), it became the residence of the Cardinal Vicar of Rome Placido Zurla (1769-1834). Cardinal Giuseppe Della Porta Rodiani (1773-1841) also resided at the palazzo as Vicar for Rome from 1838 until his death in 1841.

During the Pontificate of Pius IX (1846-1878), the building was again enlarged, this time by adding extra floors. The work was carried out under the direction of the architect Antonio Sarti (1797-1880). The newly extended palazzo was destined to become the home of the Seminario Pio, and in this form it remained basically unchanged until 1933, when the façade on the Piazza delle Cinque Lune was demolished and rebuilt along the line of the newly expanded Corso del Rinascimento. This Palazzo became the seat of the Domus Internationalis Paulus VI and the Pontifical Institute of Sacred Music.

== Domus Internationalis "Paulus VI" and the popes ==
At least two modern popes used to lodge in the building that is now the Domus Internationalis "Paulus VI" when they were cardinals. It was not until 1976 that the Domus Internationalis "Paulus VI", under the name "Casa Internazionale del Clero", was established, but a marker at the entrance to Room 426 indicates it as the one preferred by Angelo Roncalli, the future Pope John XXIII, on his visits to Rome. This is indicated also in the guest list of the entity that occupied the building in the five years when John XXIII was a cardinal (1953-1958). Pope Francis returned in person on the day after his election in order to pay the bill for his stay as Cardinal Jorge Bergoglio before the conclave of March 2013 and to thank the staff.
