= Fabio Fornari =

Italian Roman Catholic prelate

Most Reverend Fabio Fornari
- Bishop of Nardò
- Church: Catholic Church
- Diocese: Diocese of Nardò
- In office: 1583–1596
- Predecessor: Cesare Bovio
- Successor: Lelio Landi

Personal details
- Died: 20 February 1596 Nardò, Italy

Fabio Fornari (died 20 February 1596) was a Roman Catholic prelate who served as Bishop of Nardò (1583–1596).

== Biography ==
On 9 March 1583, Fabio Fornari was appointed during the papacy of Pope Gregory XIII as Bishop of Nardò. He served as Bishop of Nardò until his death on 20 February 1596.

== See also ==
- Catholic Church in Italy

== External links and additional sources ==
- Cheney, David M. "Diocese of Nardò-Gallipoli". Catholic-Hierarchy.org. (for Chronology of Bishops) ^{[self-published]}
- Chow, Gabriel. "Diocese of Nardò-Gallipoli (Italy)". GCatholic.org.(for Chronology of Bishops) ^{[self-published]}

Catholic Church titles
Preceded by Cesare Bovio	Bishop of Nardò; 1583–1596	Succeeded by Lelio Landi
