= Vico Equense =

- Comune
- Comune di Vico Equense
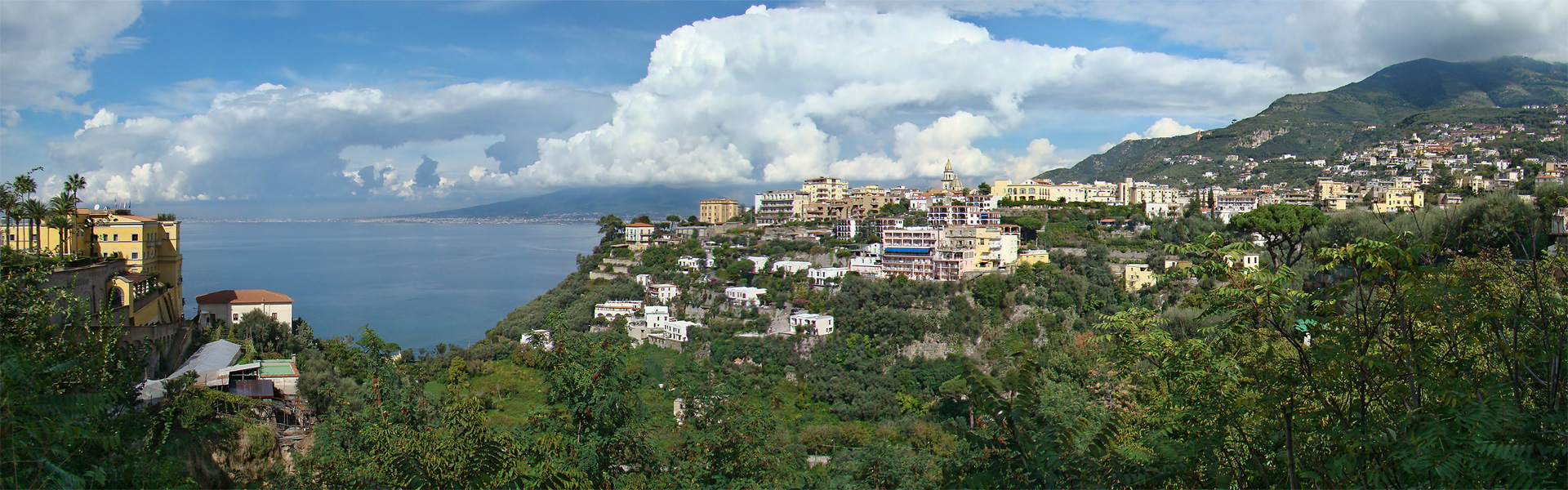

- Location within Italy Location within Campania
- Coordinates: 40°40′N 14°26′E
- Country: Italy
- Region: Campania
- Metropolitan city: Naples (NA)
- Frazioni: Arola, Bonea, Fornacelle, Massaquano, Moiano, Montechiaro, Pacognano, Pietrapiano, Preazzano, Sant'Andrea, Seiano, Ticciano, Tordigliano-Chiosse, Villaggio Monte Faito

Government
  - Mayor: Giuseppe Aiello

Area
  - Total: 29 km^{2} (11 sq mi)
- Elevation: 90 m (300 ft)

Population (31 December 2010)
  - Total: 21,174
  - Density: 730/km^{2} (1,900/sq mi)
- Demonym: Vicani
- Time zone: UTC+1 (CET)
  - Summer (DST): UTC+2 (CEST)
- Postal code: 80069
- Dialing code: 081
- Patron saint: St. Cyrus and John
- Saint day: 31 January
- Website: www.vicoequense.gov.it

Vico Equense is a coastal town and comune in the Metropolitan City of Naples, in southern Italy.

== Geography ==
Vico Equense is part of the greater Bay of Naples metropolitan area and is a tourist destination. Located on a tuff cliff, it is relatively close to the ferry to the island of Capri, the volcano Vesuvius, the Monte Faito and the ancient town of Pompeii.

The town is bordered by Castellammare di Stabia, Meta, Piano di Sorrento, Pimonte and Positano.

== Climate ==
The weather in Vico Equense is generally mild all year round, with hot, sunny and humid summers; and mild, rainy winters: the town experiences a hot-summer-Mediterranean climate (Csa on climate maps). The yearly average temperature is around 16 °C, while the total rainfall is around 990 millimeters.

Summers are long, hot, with abundant sunshine and generally stable weather conditions. Summer lasts from late May to mid September with daytime highs around 28 °C-30 °C (80s °F) and average lows around 20 °C-22 °C (upper 60s and low 70s degrees Fahrenheit). Rainfall is very rare, but brief afternoon thunderstorms can occur from time to time, humidity values stand between 50% and 80%, thus the perceived temperature is often higher than the recorded one. However, during daytime the heat is moderated by a light breeze from the Thyrrenian Sea. The hottest part of the year is usually from mid-July to mid-August. Usually, the hottest temperature recorded in a given year is 35 °C.

Autumn begins in October and lasts until early December, with low temperatures around 10 °C-15 °C (in the 50s°F) and average highs around 18 °C-22 °C (60s or low 70s°F). Autumn brings comfortable temperatures, but it is also the rainiest season; with October, November and December being the wettest months of the year. Each of these three months records, on average, around 120 mm (4.7 in) of rainfall.

Winters are mild and damp, lasting from early December to early/mid March. Rainfall ranges from common to abundant and the temperatures hover around 6 °C-12 °C (mid 40s or low 50s) at night and around 10 °C-16 °C (50s°F) during the day. It is common to have sunny and mild days even in the middle of January, with daytime highs sometimes climbing into the upper 60s (17 °C-19 °C) and overnight lows not dipping below 12 °C (54 °F). Snowfall is occasional but not uncommon at higher elevations, in the town centre snow flurries are extremely rare, while snow accumulation is even rarer. Frost happens generally once every several years. The coldest month can be either January or February. Generally the coldest temperature ever reached during the course of a given year is 3 °C (37 °F), but, when it does happen, the weather is often very windy, thus making it feel much colder. Recently, during winter it is more likely to experience cool weather conditions later in the season, even in March.

In March the weather is changeable, often windy and cool with occasional showers, temperatures stand between 6 °C and 10 °C (mid/upper 40s) during the night and hover around 14 °C to 18 °C (upper 50s or 60s) during the day. Spring is very pleasant with temperatures around 10 °C-15 °C (50s°F) at night and between 17 °C-23 °C at daytime (60s and low 70s°F). Rainfall is common, but becomes gradually less frequent from March all over to June. In May the first thunderstorms of the "cherry season" occur.

The highest temperature ever recorded in Vico Equense is 39.2 °C (102.6 °F) on 24 July 2023; while the lowest is −1.6 °C (29.1 °F) on 31 December 2014. The highest overnight low temperature is 31.7 °C (89.1 °F) on 25 July 2023, the lowest daytime high temperature is 3 °C (37 °F) on 7 January 2017. The area suffered from extreme drought during the latter half of 2016 and all of 2017, a year when numerous wildfires destroyed much of the forest cover on Mt. Vesuvius.

The heaviest snowfall in the town centre is 2 cm (0.79 in) on 31 December 2014 and 27 February 2018 and the most severe frost occurred on 6–8 January 2017, which are the coldest three days of the last decades. On average, there are no days below freezing and 8 days where the temperature fails to reach 10 °C (50 °F).

However, at higher elevations in the Lattari mountains chain, heavy snowfall and snowstorms have been recorded. The heaviest snowfall in recent memory happened on 20 January 2023, when about 60 to 80 centimeters (2 - 2.6 feet) of snow fell in less than 24 hours at elevations of at least 900 m. During the summer, there are about 24 days in which the temperature climbs to 32 °C (90 °F). The first day that sees a maximum temperature at or above 21 °C (70 °F) is on average in late April; the first day on which the temperature reaches 28 °C (82 °F) is in early June.

Historically, Vico Equense had always had very stable weather and an overall very pleasant climate. Extreme weather events and repentine temperature changes were mostly unheard of. However, due to climate change, the town is experiencing hot extremes as it had never seen before, with long periods of hot and muggy weather during the summer; along with droughts, heavy downpours or hail in severe storms that are unprecedented in the region's meteorological history. For example, on 29 October 2018, a record-breaking wind storm hit the area. In this occasion, the highest wind speed and gust ever recorded occurred: respectively 44 and 60 knots (51 and 69 mph; 81 and 111 km/h).

== History ==
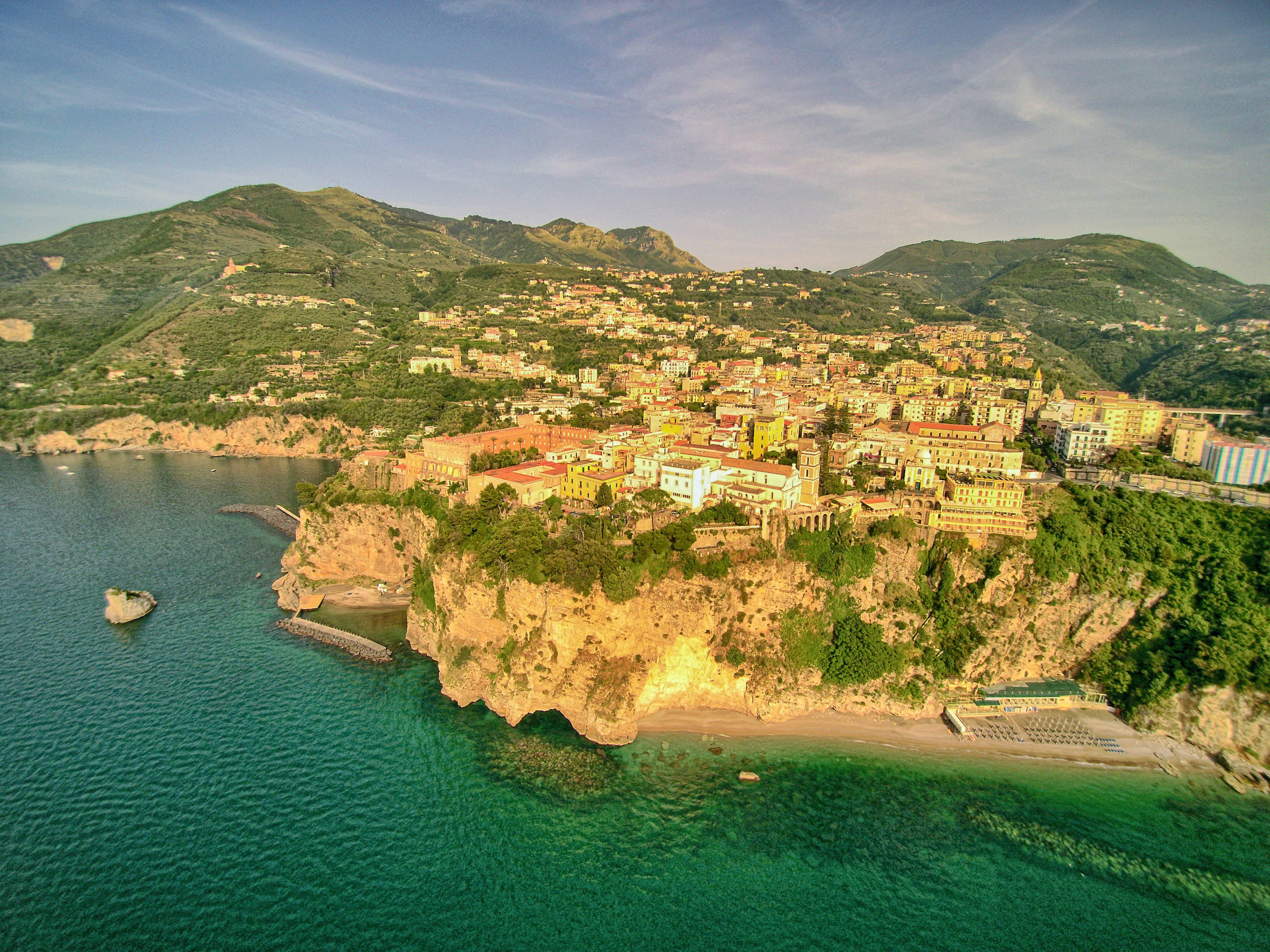
View from the sea

A 7th century pre-Roman necropolis has been found in the area. Later, when it was called Aequana (in Latin), Roman patricians chose it for their villas. After a long decline, the centre started to flourish again in the late 13th century, when it became independent from the Duchy of Sorrento and King Charles II of Naples repeatedly sojourned in the town, where he also built a castle (1301). The cathedral, the only example of a Gothic Cathedral in the Sorrentine Peninsula, also dates to this period.

Vico Equense was the birthplace of the playwright and dabbler in natural magic Giambattista Della Porta (1535–1615).

The great Russian dancer, Violetta Elvin, born Prokhorova, lived with her family in Vico Equense, where she took refuge in 1956 after abandoning a successful career in all theatres of the world. Her career will be reconstructed in the biographical novel by Raffaele Lauro entitled "Dance The Love – A Star in Vico Equense", to be published by GoldenGate Edizioni in 2016.

Bruce Springsteen's maternal grandfather, Antonio Zerilli, was from Vico Equense. He dedicated the song "My Hometown" to the place.

== Monuments and places of interest ==
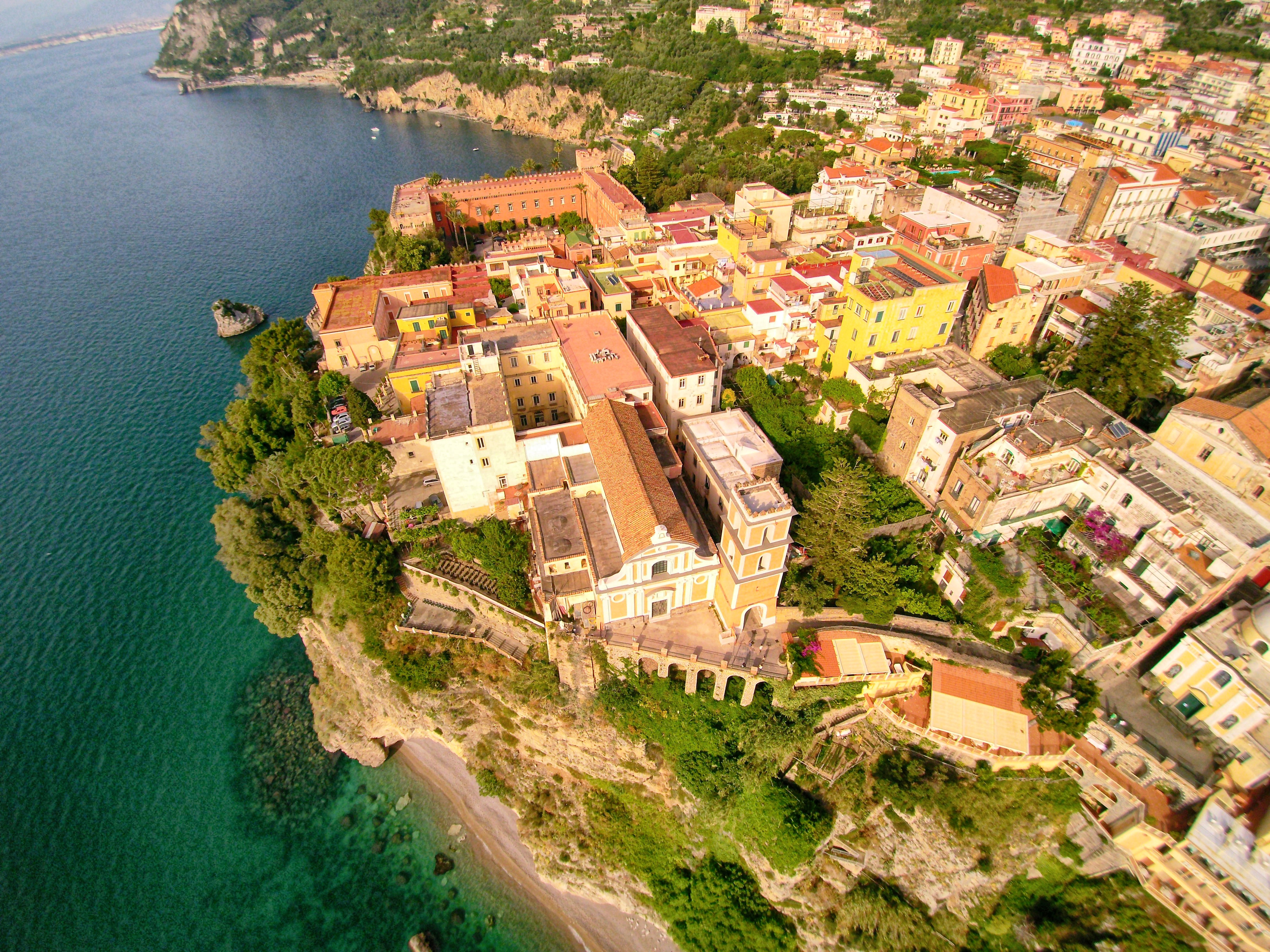
The former Cathedral of the Annunciation, seen from above

The Church of the Annunciation was the cathedral of the Diocese of Vico Equense, until 1818, when it was abolished. Built in the early 14th century on a clifftop overlooking the sea, it is an example of Gothic architecture, while the facade is in Baroque style.

The Antiquarium Silio Italico is an archaeological museum founded in 1966 that collects mainly funerary objects found in a necropolis, discovered in Vico Equense during the construction of some buildings in the 1960s and 1970s.

The Campanian Mineralogic Museum, founded in 1992, had originally on display a collection of mineral samples donated by Pasquale Discepolo, a local engineer. As the years went by the museum has further enriched its collections, adding various display sections dedicated to gemstones, palaeontology and even anthropology. The museum is one of the most important Campanian science museums.

Among the natural attractions of the area is the Scrajo spa, founded in 1895. At the spa, they offer therapies for various diseases, thanks to the several sources of sulfur water that feed into the centre. The complex is also used for beach tourism, thanks to its proximity to the sea.

== Transport ==
=== Railroad ===
Since 1948, Vico Equense is crossed by the Circumvesuviana railway network. The city has three stations. The main station is called "Vico Equense" and serves the village centre. The station "Seiano" serves the fraction of Seiano and the station "Scrajo Terme" that allows access to tourists to the nearby spa and bathing.

=== Harbors ===
The city is served by the harbour of Vico Equense, mainly used by fishing vessels and boats of tourist use, and the larger port of Seiano, also used for passenger service to Capri and Sorrento. Both ports are connected to the city centre with a bus service.

== See also ==
- Sorrentine Peninsula
- Amalfi Coast
