= Michelangelo Tonti =

17th-century Catholic cardinal

His Eminence Michelangelo Tonti
- Cardinal-Priest of San Pietro in Vincoli; Archbishop (Personal Title) of Cesena
- Church: Catholic Church

Orders
- Consecration: 16 Nov 1608 by Fabio Biondi

Personal details
- Born: Dec 1566 Rimini, Italy
- Died: 21 Apr 1622 (age 55)

Michelangelo Tonti (1566–1622) was a Roman Catholic cardinal.

== Biography ==
On 16 Nov 1608, he was consecrated bishop by Fabio Biondi, Titular Patriarch of Jerusalem, with Metello Bichi, Bishop Emeritus of Sovana, and Giambattista Leni, Bishop of Mileto, serving as co-consecrators.

== Episcopal succession ==
Episcopal succession of Michelangelo Tonti

While bishop, he was the principal consecrator of:

- Filippo Filonardi, Bishop of Aquino (1608);
- Domenico Rivarola, Bishop of Aleria (1608);
- Giovanni Battista Biglia, Bishop of Pavia (1609);
- Ulpiano Volpi, Archbishop of Chieti (1609);
- Francesco Mottini, Bishop of Brugnato (1609);
- Benedetto Ala, Archbishop of Urbino (1610);
- Luca Semproni, Bishop of Città di Castello (1610);
- Giovanni Canauli, Bishop of Fossombrone (1610);
- Giovanni Francesco Murta, Bishop of Aleria (1611);
- Antonio Ricci, Bishop of Arezzo (1611);
- Gregorio Carbonelli, Titular Bishop of Diocaesarea in Palaestina (1611);

and the principal co-consecrator of:

- Lanfranco Margotti, Bishop of Viterbo e Tuscania (1609);
- Felice Centini, Bishop of Mileto (1611); and
- Gregorio Petrocchini, Cardinal-Bishop of Palestrina (1611).

Catholic Church titles
Preceded by Maffeo Barberini	Titular Archbishop of Nazareth; 1608–1609	Succeeded by Domenico Rivarola
Preceded by Filippo Spinelli	Cardinal-Priest of San Bartolomeo all'Isola; 1608–1621	Succeeded by Gabriel Trejo y Paniagua
Preceded by Camillo Gualandi	Archbishop (Personal Title) of Cesena; 1609–1622	Succeeded by Francesco Sacrati (cardinal)
Preceded by Domenico Pinelli, seniore	Archpriest of the Basilica di Santa Maria Maggiore; 1611–1622	Succeeded by Giovanni Garzia Mellini
Preceded by François d'Escoubleau de Sourdis	Cardinal-Priest of San Pietro in Vincoli; 1621–1622	Succeeded by Luigi Capponi
