= Antonio Ricci (bishop of Arezzo) =

Italian Roman Catholic prelate

Most Reverend Antonio Ricci
- Bishop of Arezzo
- Church: Catholic Church
- Diocese: Diocese of Arezzo
- In office: 1611–1637
- Predecessor: Pietro Usimbardi
- Successor: Tommaso Salviati

Orders
- Consecration: 3 Jul 1611 by Michelangelo Tonti

Personal details
- Born: 1573 Florence, Italy
- Died: 20 Dec 1637 (age 64) Arezzo, Italy

Antonio Ricci (1573–1637) was a Roman Catholic prelate who served as Bishop of Arezzo (1611–1637).

== Biography ==
Antonio Ricci was born in Florence, Italy in 1573. On 27 Jun 1611, he was appointed during the papacy of Pope Paul V as Bishop of Arezzo. On 3 Jul 1611, he was consecrated bishop by Michelangelo Tonti, Bishop of Cesena, with Domenico Rivarola, Titular Archbishop of Nazareth, and Giovanni Canauli, Bishop of Fossombrone, serving as co-consecrators. He served as Bishop of Arezzo until his death on 20 Dec 1637.

== Episcopal succession ==
While bishop, he was the principal co-consecrator of:

- Gregorio Carbonelli, Titular Bishop of Diocaesarea in Palaestina (1611);
- Roberto Roberti (bishop), Bishop of Tricarico (1612); and
- Tiberio Muti, Bishop of Viterbo e Tuscania (1612).

Catholic Church titles
Preceded by Pietro Usimbardi	Bishop of Arezzo; 1611–1637	Succeeded by Tommaso Salviati
