= Giovanni Canauli =

Catholic prelate

Most Reverend Giovanni Canauli
- Bishop of Fossombrone
- Church: Catholic Church
- Diocese: Diocese of Fossombrone
- In office: 1610–1612
- Predecessor: Ottavio Accoramboni
- Successor: Lorenzo Landi

Orders
- Consecration: 22 August 1610 by Michelangelo Tonti

Personal details
- Born: 1572 Città di Castello, Papal States
- Died: 2 August 1619 (age 47) Fossombrone, Papal States

Giovanni Canauli or Giovanni Cannuli (1572 – 2 August 1619) was a Catholic prelate who served as Bishop of Fossombrone (1610–1612).

== Biography ==
Giovanni Canauli was born in Città di Castello, Italy in 1572. On 2 August 1610, he was appointed during the papacy of Pope Paul V as Bishop of Fossombrone. On 22 August 1610, he was consecrated bishop by Michelangelo Tonti, Bishop of Cesena, with Ottavio Accoramboni, Bishop Emeritus of Fossombrone, and Metello Bichi, Bishop Emeritus of Sovana, serving as co-consecrators. He served as Bishop of Fossombrone until his resignation in 1612. He died on 2 August 1619.

== Episcopal succession ==
Episcopal succession of Giovanni Canauli

While bishop, he was the principal co-consecrator of:

- Stefano de Vicari, Bishop of Nocera de' Pagani (1610);
- Hermann Ottemberg, Bishop of Arras (1611);
- Erasmo Paravicini, Bishop of Alessandria della Paglia (1611);
- Giovanni Francesco Murta (de Mirto), Bishop of Aleria (1611);
- Antonio Maria Franceschini, Bishop of Amelia (1611);
- Antonio Ricci, Bishop of Arezzo (1611);
- Gregorio Carbonelli, Titular Bishop of Diocaesarea in Palaestina (1611); and
- Roberto Roberti (bishop) (Vittori), Bishop of Tricarico (1612)

== External links and additional sources ==
- Cheney, David M. "Diocese of Fossombrone". Catholic-Hierarchy.org. (for Chronology of Bishops) ^{[self-published]}
- Chow, Gabriel. "Diocese of Fossombrone (Italy)". GCatholic.org. (for Chronology of Bishops) ^{[self-published]}

Catholic Church titles
Preceded by Ottavio Accoramboni	Bishop of Fossombrone; 1610–1612	Succeeded by Lorenzo Landi
