= Girolamo Rusticucci =

Italian cardinal and bishop

- Cardinal-Bishop of Porto e Santa Rufina
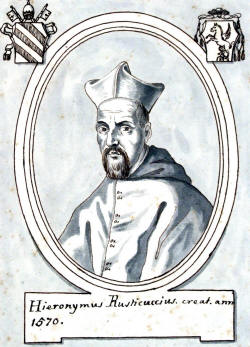
- Church: Catholic Church
- Diocese: Suburbicarian Diocese of Porto e Santa Rufina
- In office: 19 February 1603 – 14 June 1603
- Predecessor: Tolomeo Gallio
- Successor: Girolamo Simoncelli
- Previous posts: Cardinal-Bishop of Sabina (1600-1603); Cardinal-Bishop of Albano (1598-1600); Cardinal-Priest of Santa Maria in Trastevere (1597-1598); Cardinal-Priest of Santa Susanna (1570-1597); Bishop of Senigallia (1570-1577)

Orders
- Consecration: 26 November 1570 by Marcantonio Maffei
- Created cardinal: 17 May 1570 by Pope Pius V

Personal details
- Born: 1537 Cartoceto, March of Ancona, Papal States
- Died: 14 June 1603 (aged 65–66) Rome, Papal States

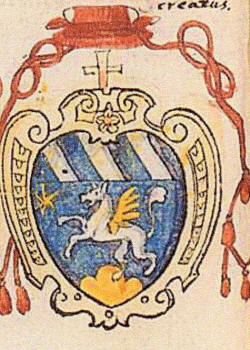
Coat of arms of Cardinal Girolamo Rusticucci.

Girolamo Rusticucci (1537 – 14 June 1603) was an Italian Roman Catholic cardinal and bishop. He was personal secretary to Cardinal Michele Ghislieri, later Pope Pius V, who made Rusticucci a cardinal. He occupied numerous important positions, including papal legate to France and Spain, Camerlengo (treasurer) and Vice-Dean of the College of Cardinals, and Vicar General of Rome.

He built a palace near Saint Peter's Square in Rome, located on a new piazza that was named after the cardinal.

== Biography ==
Girolamo Rusticucci was born in Cartoceto in 1537, the son of Ludovico Rusticucci, a famous jurisconsult, and his wife Diamante Leonardi. As a young man, he studied literature and oratory.

Rusticucci traveled to Rome in 1557, entering the court of Cardinal Michele Ghislieri, who later became Pope Pius V, as the cardinal's personal secretary. When the cardinal became pope, he made Rusticucci a protonotary apostolic. Also, when Cardinal Michele Bonelli, Pope Pius V's cardinal-nephew, was absent, the pope put Rusticucci in charge of managing most of the church's affairs.

Pope Pius V made him a cardinal priest in the consistory of 17 May 1570. He received the red hat and the titular church of Santa Susanna on 9 June 1570.

On 16 June 1570 he was elected Bishop of Senigallia. He was consecrated as a bishop in the Sistine Chapel by Cardinal Marcantonio Maffei with Francesco Rusticucci, Bishop of Fano, and Giuseppe Pamphilj, Bishop of Segni, serving as co-consecrators. As a bishop, he promoted educating his clergy along the lines provided by the Council of Trent. He resigned the government of the diocese sometime before 29 November 1577.

Pope Pius V then named him papal legate to Spain and the Kingdom of France to promote war against the Ottoman Empire. He participated in the papal conclave of 1572 that elected Pope Gregory XIII, and in the papal conclave of 1585 that elected Pope Sixtus V. He served as Vicar General of Rome from 1588 to 1603. He was also a participant in the papal conclave of September 1590 that elected Pope Urban VII; the papal conclave of October–December 1590 that elected Pope Gregory XIV; and the papal conclave of 1591 that elected Pope Innocent IX. He became Camerlengo of the Sacred College of Cardinals on 8 January 1590 and was confirmed in the post on 14 February 1592. He participated in the papal conclave of 1592 that elected Pope Clement VIII. The new pope confirmed him as Camerlengo of the Sacred College of Cardinals, and he held that position from 14 February 1592 to 1593.

On 18 August 1597 he opted for the titular church of Santa Maria in Trastevere. Soon thereafter, he became the cardinal protopriest. He opted for the order of cardinal bishops on 30 March 1598, taking the Suburbicarian Diocese of Albano. He opted for the Suburbicarian Diocese of Sabina on 21 February 1600 and then for the Suburbicarian Diocese of Porto e Santa Rufina on 19 February 1603. He was the Vice-Dean of the College of Cardinals.

He died in Rome on 14 June 1603. He was buried in Santa Susanna.

== Palazzo Rusticucci-Accoramboni ==
In 1584 Rusticucci, after having bought a lesser palace and several houses at the west end of Via Alessandrina in Borgo, gave to Domenico Fontana the task to build a new palace there, the Palazzo Rusticucci-Accoramboni. The work was finished by Fontana's nephew, Carlo Maderno. After the work for the erection of Saint Peter's Square, the palace occupied the north side of a new piazza, Piazza Rusticucci, which was named after the cardinal.

== Sources ==
- Gigli, Laura (1992). Guide rionali di Roma (in Italian). Vol. Borgo (III). Roma: Fratelli Palombi Editori. ISSN 0393-2710.
