= Marco Cornaro (disambiguation) =

Marco Cornaro (1286–1368) was doge of Venice.

Marco Cornaro may also refer to:

- Marco Cornaro (1406–1479), patrician of Venice and the father of Catherine Cornaro, queen of Cyprus
- Marco Cornaro (cardinal) (1482–1524), Italian Roman Catholic cardinal
- Marco Cornaro (1557–1625), Italian Roman Catholic bishop
- Marco Antonio Cornaro (1583–1639), Italian Roman Catholic bishop
