= Pier Luigi Carafa =

Pier Luigi Carafa or Pierluigi Carafa may refer to:

- Pier Luigi Carafa (1581–1655), cardinal
- Pier Luigi Carafa (bishop) (died 1672), bishop of Tricarico
- Pier Luigi Carafa (1677–1755), cardinal
