= Portrait of Monsignor Della Casa =

Painting by Pontormo

Portrait of Monsignor Della Casa (c. 1541–1544) by Pontormo

Portrait of Monsignor Della Casa (previously known as Portrait of Niccolò Ardinghelli) is a c. 1541-1544 oil on panel by Pontormo, now in the National Gallery of Art in Washington, D.C. Previously identified as Niccolò Ardinghelli, it is now thought to show Giovanni della Casa, author of Galateo.

At the start of the 20th century it was in marquess Bargagli's collection in Florence, before being sold in Paris in 1909, with an attribution to Sebastiano del Piombo. It passed through the hands of various owners before being acquired in 1922, by Alessandro Contini Bonacossi, who sold it on to the Samuel H. Kress Foundation in 1952, who finally gave it to its present owner in 1961.
