= Luberti =

Luberti is a surname. Notable people with the name include:

- Jacobus Luberti Augustini (1748 – 1822), 18th-century painter from the northern Netherlands
- Marco Luberti, (born 1941), Italian lyricist, record producer and singer-songwriter

== See also ==
- Roberti (surname)
