= Diomede Carafa =

Diomede Carafa may refer to:

- Diomede Carafa (died 1487), count of Maddaloni
- Diomede Carafa (cardinal) (1492–1560)
- Diomede Carafa (1520–1561), count of Cerreto and duke of Maddaloni
- Diomede Carafa (died 1572), brother of Pope Paul IV and governor of Castel Sant'Angelo
- Diomede Carafa (bishop of Tricarico) (died 1609)
- Diomede Carafa (1611–1660), count of Cerreto and duke of Maddaloni

== See also ==
- Palazzo Diomede Carafa
