= Francesco Rusticucci =

Italian Roman Catholic prelate

The Most Reverend Francesco Rusticucci
- Bishop of Fano
- Church: Catholic Church
- Diocese: Diocese of Fano
- In office: 1567–1587
- Predecessor: Ippolito Capilupo
- Successor: Giulio Ottinelli
- Previous post: Bishop of Venosa (1566–1567)

Orders
- Consecration: 21 September 1566 by Scipione Rebiba

Personal details
- Died: 1587 Fano, Italy

Francesco Rusticucci (died 1587) was a Roman Catholic prelate who served as Bishop of Fano (1567–1587) and Bishop of Venosa (1566–1567).

== Biography ==
On 21 August 1566, Francesco Rusticucci was appointed during the papacy of Pope Pius V as Bishop of Venosa. On 21 September 1566, he was consecrated bishop by Scipione Rebiba, Cardinal-Priest of Sant'Anastasia, with Giulio Antonio Santorio, Archbishop of Santa Severina, and Carlo Grassi, Bishop of Corneto (Tarquinia) e Montefiascone, serving as co-consecrators. On 31 January 1567, he was appointed by Pope Pius V as Bishop of Fano. He served as Bishop of Fano until his death in 1587.

== Episcopal succession ==
While bishop, he was the principal co-consecrator of:

- Alessandro Mazza, Bishop of Fossombrone (1569);
- Aurelio Griani, Bishop of Lettere-Gragnano (1570);
- Giovanni Domenico Rebiba, Bishop of Ortona (1570);
- Girolamo Rusticucci, Bishop of Senigallia (1570);
- Carlo Montigli, Archbishop of Amalfi (1570);
- Lelio Morelli, Bishop of Capaccio (1586); and
- Bonaventura Furlani, Bishop of Alatri (1586).

== External links and additional sources ==
- Cheney, David M. "Diocese of Venosa". Catholic-Hierarchy.org. (for Chronology of Bishops) ^{[self-published]}
- Chow, Gabriel. "Diocese of Venosa". GCatholic.org. (for Chronology of Bishops) ^{[self-published]}
- Cheney, David M. "Diocese of Fano-Fossombrone-Cagli-Pergola". Catholic-Hierarchy.org. (for Chronology of Bishops) ^{[self-published]}
- Chow, Gabriel. "Diocese of Fano-Fossombrone-Cagli-Pergola (Italy)". GCatholic.org. (for Chronology of Bishops) ^{[self-published]}

Catholic Church titles
Preceded by Simone Gattola	Bishop of Venosa; 1566–1567	Succeeded by Paolo Oberti
Preceded by Ippolito Capilupo	Bishop of Fano; 1567–1587	Succeeded by Giulio Ottinelli
