= Domenico Rivarola =

17th-century Catholic cardinal

His Eminence Domenico Rivarola
- Cardinal-Priest of Santi Silvestro e Martino ai Monti; Titular Archbishop of Nazareth
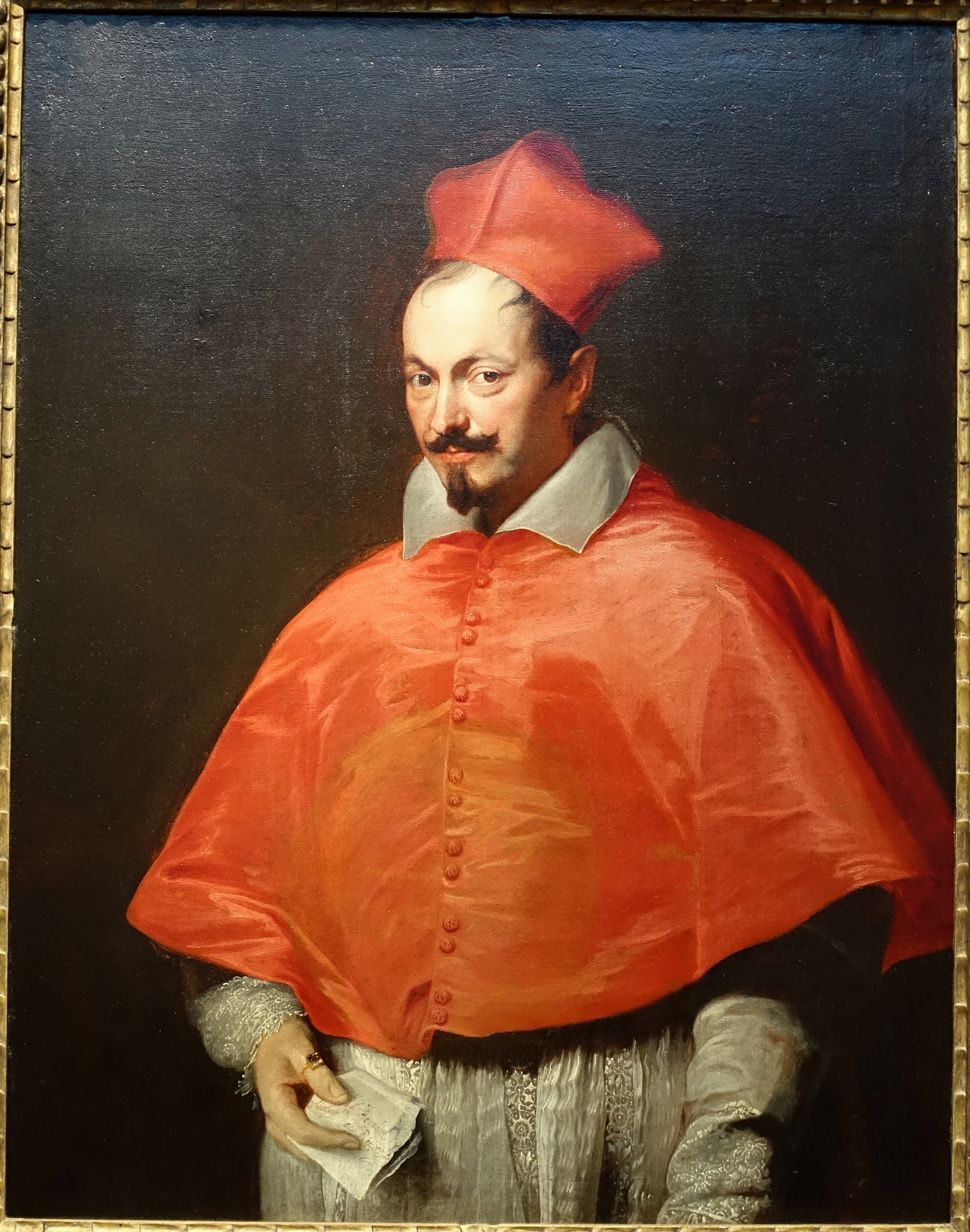
- Portrait of Cardinal Domenico Rivarola, by Sir Anthony van Dyck (c.1623-1624)
- Church: Catholic Church

Orders
- Consecration: 28 Dec 1608 by Michelangelo Tonti

Personal details
- Born: 1575 Genoa, Italy
- Died: 3 Jan 1627 (age 52)

Domenico Rivarola (1575–1627) was a Roman Catholic cardinal.

== Biography ==
On 28 Dec 1608, he was consecrated bishop by Michelangelo Tonti, Cardinal-Priest of San Bartolomeo all'Isola, with Metello Bichi, Bishop Emeritus of Sovana, and Valeriano Muti, Bishop of Città di Castello, serving as co-consecrators.

== Episcopal succession ==
While bishop, he was the principal consecrator of:

- Decius Giustiniani, Bishop of Aleria (1612);
- Gilles de Souvre, Bishop of Comminges (1617);
- Francesco Maria Spinola, Bishop of Savona (1624);
- Pietro Francesco Costa, Bishop of Albenga (1624);

and the principal co-consecrator of:

- Giovanni Battista Biglia, Bishop of Pavia (1609);
- Sebastiano Roberti, Bishop of Tricarico (1609);
- Ulpiano Volpi, Archbishop of Chieti (1609);
- Francesco Mottini, Bishop of Brugnato (1609);
- Giovanni Sauli, Bishop of Aleria (1609);
- Bernardo Giustiniano, Bishop of Anglona-Tursi (1609);
- Antonio Albergati, Bishop of Bisceglie (1609);
- Girolamo Giovannelli, Bishop of Sora (1609);
- Hermann Ottemberg, Bishop of Arras (1611);
- Giovanni Francesco Murta (de Mirto), Bishop of Aleria (1611);
- Antonio Maria Franceschini, Bishop of Amelia (1611); and
- Antonio Ricci, Bishop of Arezzo (1611).

Catholic Church titles
Preceded by Ottavio Belmosto	Bishop of Aleria; 1608–1609	Succeeded by Giovanni Sauli
Preceded by Michelangelo Tonti	Titular Archbishop of Nazareth; 1609–1627	Succeeded by Antonio Lambardi
Preceded by Fernando Niño de Guevara	Cardinal-Priest of Santi Silvestro e Martino ai Monti; 1611–1627	Succeeded by Alfonso de la Cueva-Benavides y Mendoza-Carrillo
