= Giovanni Battista Biglia =

17th-century Roman Catholic bishop

Most Reverend Giovanni Battista Biglia
- Bishop of Pavia
- Church: Catholic Church
- Diocese: Diocese of Pavia
- In office: 1609–1617
- Predecessor: Guglielmo Bastoni
- Successor: Fabrizio Landriani

Orders
- Consecration: 1 Feb 1609 by Michelangelo Tonti

Personal details
- Born: 1570 Milan, Italy
- Died: 1617 (age 47)

Giovanni Battista Biglia (1570–1617) was a Catholic prelate who served as Bishop of Pavia (1609–1617).

== Biography ==
Giovanni Battista Biglia was born in 1570 in Milan, Italy. On 19 Jan 1609, he was appointed during the papacy of Pope Paul V as Bishop of Pavia. On 1 Feb 1609, he was consecrated bishop by Michelangelo Tonti, Cardinal-Priest of San Bartolomeo all'Isola, with Ottavio Belmosto (Belmusti), Bishop Emeritus of Aleria, and Domenico Rivarola, Bishop of Aleria, serving as co-consecrators. He served as Bishop of Pavia until his death in 1617.

== External links and additional sources ==
- Cheney, David M. "Diocese of Pavia". Catholic-Hierarchy.org. (for Chronology of Bishops) ^{[self-published]}
- Chow, Gabriel. "Diocese of Pavia". GCatholic.org. (for Chronology of Bishops) ^{[self-published]}

Catholic Church titles
Preceded by Guglielmo Bastoni	Bishop of Pavia; 1609–1617	Succeeded by Fabrizio Landriani
