= Giambattista Leni =

Italian cardinal (1573–1627)

Giambattista Leni (1573–1627) was a Roman Catholic cardinal.on consistory of 20 November 1608 was created cardinal by Pope Paul V

On 20 July 1608, he was consecrated bishop by Ottavio Paravicini, Cardinal-Priest of Sant'Alessio, with Marco Cornaro, Bishop of Padua, and Diego Alvarez, Archbishop of Trani, serving as co-consecrators.

Much of the initial construction of the Barnabite's church in Rome, San Carlo ai Catinari, was done at Leni's personal expense.

== Episcopal succession ==
While bishop, he was the principal consecrator of:

- Sebastiano Roberti, Bishop of Tricarico (1609);
- Pedro de Mata y Haro, Bishop of Belcastro (1609);
- Erasmo Paravicini, Bishop of Alessandria della Paglia (1611);
- Antonio Maria Franceschini, Bishop of Amelia (1611);
- Roberto Roberti (bishop), Bishop of Tricarico (1612);
- Camillo Moro, Bishop of Termoli (1612);
- Giovanni Francesco Guidi di Bagno, Titular Archbishop of Patrae (1614);
- Vitaliano Visconti Borromeo, Titular Archbishop of Hadrianopolis in Haemimonto (1616);
- Vincenzo Landinelli, Bishop of Albenga (1616);
- Carlo Carafa, Bishop of Aversa (1616);
- Altobello Carissimi, Bishop of Minervino Murge (1617);
- Alfonso Sacrati, Bishop of Comacchio (1617);
- Fabrizio Landriani, Bishop of Pavia (1617);
- Ippolito Borghese (bishop), Bishop of Montalcino (1618);
- Marsilio Peruzzi, Archbishop of Chieti (1618);
- Gregorio Del Bufalo, Bishop of Calvi Risorta (1619);
- Maurizio Ricci, Bishop of Cariati e Cerenzia (1619);
- Alfonso Giglioli, Bishop of Anglona-Tursi (1619);
- Ferdinando Millini, Bishop of Imola (1619);
- Francesco Campanari, Bishop of Alatri (1620);
- Alfonso Petrucci (bishop), Bishop of Chiusi (1620);
- Pietro Campori, Bishop of Cremona (1621);
- Giulio Roma, Bishop of Recanati e Loreto (1621);
- Desiderio Scaglia, Bishop of Melfi e Rapolla (1621);
- Giacinto Petroni, Bishop of Molfetta (1622);
- Giovanni Battista Roviglioni, Bishop of Troia (1623);

and the principal co-consecrator of:

- Michelangelo Tonti, Titular Archbishop of Nazareth (1608).

Catholic Church titles
Preceded by Marco Antonio del Tufo	Bishop of Mileto; 1608–1611	Succeeded by Felice Centini
Preceded by Alfonso Visconti	Cardinal-Priest of San Sisto; 1608–1618	Succeeded by Francisco Gómez Rojas de Sandoval
Preceded by Giovanni Fontana	Bishop of Ferrara; 1611–1627	Succeeded by Lorenzo Magalotti
Preceded by Paolo Emilio Sfondrati	Cardinal-Priest of Santa Cecilia; 1618–1627	Succeeded by Federico Baldissera Bartolomeo Cornaro
Preceded by Scipione Caffarelli-Borghese	Archpriest of the Arcibasilica di San Giovanni in Laterano; 1620–1627	Succeeded by Francesco Barberini (seniore)
