= Alessandro Mazza =

Prelate of the Catholic Church in Italy from 1569 to 1575

Most Reverend Alessandro Mazza
- Bishop of Fossombrone
- Church: Catholic Church
- Diocese: Diocese of Fossombrone
- In office: 1569–1575
- Predecessor: Lodovico Ardinghelli
- Successor: Orazio Montegranelli

Orders
- Consecration: 17 April 1569 by Giulio della Rovere

Personal details
- Died: Padua

Alessandro Mazza was a prelate of the Catholic Church who served as Bishop of Fossombrone from 1569 to 1575.

== Biography ==
On 1 April 1569, Alessandro Mazza was appointed during the papacy of Pope Pius V as Bishop of Fossombrone.

On 17 April 1569, he was consecrated bishop by Giulio della Rovere, Archbishop of Ravenna, with Ippolito Arrivabene, Bishop Emeritus of Hierapetra, and Francesco Rusticucci, Bishop of Fano, serving as co-consecrators.

He served as Bishop of Fossombrone until his resignation in 1575.

== External links and additional sources ==
- "Diocese of Fossombrone". Catholic-Hierarchy.org. David M. Cheney. 23 October 2022. (for Chronology of Bishops)
- Chow, Gabriel (23 October 2022). "Diocese of Fossombrone, Italy". GCatholic.org. (for Chronology of Bishops)

Catholic Church titles
Preceded by Lodovico Ardinghelli	Bishop of Fossombrone; 1569–1575	Succeeded by Orazio Montegranelli
