= Roberti (surname) =

Roberti is a surname. Notable people with the surname include:

- Carlo Roberti de' Vittori (1605–1673), Roman Catholic cardinal
- David Roberti (born 1939), American politician
- Ercole de' Roberti (c. 1451–1496), also known as Ercole Ferrarese or Ercole da Ferrara, was an Italian artist
- Francesco Roberti (1889–1977), Italian cardinal
- Francesco Roberti (politician) (born 1967), Italian politician
- Franco Roberti (born 1947), Italian magistrate and politician
- Girolamo Frigimelica Roberti (1653–1732), Italian architect, librettist, and poet
- Giambattista Roberti (1719–1786), Italian Jesuit, poet and writer
- Giovanni Roberti (1909–2010), Italian politician
- Jean Roberti (also Johannes) (1569–1651), Jesuit and theological writer
- Lyda Roberti (1906–1938), Russian-born American stage and film actress, and singer
- Margherita Roberti, American operatic soprano
- Maria Grazia Roberti (born 1966), Italian female mountain runner and snowshoe runner
- Roberto Roberti (bishop) (1575–1624), Roman Catholic prelate
- Roberto Roberti (1879–1959), Italian actor, screenwriter and film director
- Sarina Roberti (born 1963), Belgian rhythmic gymnast
- Sebastiano Roberti or Settimio Vittori (1573–1668), Roman Catholic prelate
- Vito Roberti (1911–1998), Italian prelate of the Catholic Church

== See also ==
- Roberti (disambiguation)
- Roberts (surname)
