= Andrea Francolisio d'Aquino =

17th-century Roman Catholic bishop

Most Reverend Andrea Francolisio d'Aquino
- Bishop Emeritus of Tricarico
- Church: Catholic Church
- Diocese: Diocese of Tricarico
- In office: 1673–1676
- Predecessor: Pier Luigi Carafa
- Successor: Gaspare Toralto

Orders
- Ordination: 30 Nov 1672
- Consecration: 12 Mar 1673 by Gasparo Carpegna

Personal details
- Born: 29 Jul 1639 Naples, Italy
- Died: 23 Mar 1715 (age 75)

Andrea Francolisio d'Aquino (1639–1715) was a Roman Catholic prelate who served as Bishop of Tricarico (1673–1676).

== Biography ==
Andrea Francolisio d'Aquino was born on 29 Jul 1639 in Naples and ordained a priest on 30 Nov 1672. On 27 Feb 1673, he was appointed during the papacy of Pope Clement X as Bishop of Tricarico. On 12 Mar 1673, he was consecrated bishop by Gasparo Carpegna, Cardinal-Priest of San Silvestro in Capite, with Alessandro Crescenzi, Titular Patriarch of Alexandria, and Giacinto Libelli, Archbishop of Avignon, serving as co-consecrators. He served as Bishop of Tricarico until his resignation on 18 Jun 1676. He died on 23 Mar 1715.

== External links and additional sources ==
- Cheney, David M. "Diocese of Tricarico". Catholic-Hierarchy.org. (for Chronology of Bishops) ^{[self-published]}
- Chow, Gabriel. "Diocese of Tricarico (Italy)". GCatholic.org. (for Chronology of Bishops) ^{[self-published]}

Catholic Church titles
| Preceded by Pier Luigi Carafa | Bishop of Tricarico; 1673–1676 | Succeeded by Gaspare Toralto |
