= Lorenzo Landi =

Roman Catholic prelate

Most Reverend Lorenzo Landi
- Bishop of Fossombrone
- Church: Catholic Church
- Diocese: Diocese of Fossombrone
- In office: 1612–1627
- Predecessor: Giovanni Canauli
- Successor: Benedetto Landi

Orders
- Consecration: 29 July 1612 by Giovanni Garzia Mellini

Personal details
- Born: 1567 Velletri, Papal States
- Died: 12 December 1627 (aged 59–60) Fossombrone, Papal States

Lorenzo Landi (1567 – 12 December 1627) was a Roman Catholic prelate who served as Bishop of Fossombrone (1612–1627).

== Biography ==
Lorenzo Landi was born in Velletri, Italy in 1567. On 4 July 1612, he was appointed during the papacy of Pope Paul V as Bishop of Fossombrone. On 29 July 1612, he was consecrated bishop by Giovanni Garzia Mellini, Cardinal-Priest of Santi Quattro Coronati, with Ottavio Accoramboni, Bishop Emeritus of Fossombrone, and Paolo De Curtis, Bishop Emeritus of Isernia, serving as co-consecrators. He served as Bishop of Fossombrone until his death on 12 December 1627.

== Episcopal succession ==
While bishop, he was the principal co-consecrator of:

- Ottavio Ridolfi, Bishop of Ariano (1612);
- Francesco Cennini de' Salamandri, Bishop of Amelia (1612);
- Francesco Diotallevi, Bishop of Sant'Angelo dei Lombardi e Bisaccia (1614); and
- Girolamo Curlo, Bishop of Ventimiglia (1614).

== External links and additional sources ==
- Cheney, David M. "Diocese of Fossombrone". Catholic-Hierarchy.org. (for Chronology of Bishops) ^{[self-published]}
- Chow, Gabriel. "Diocese of Fossombrone (Italy)". GCatholic.org. (for Chronology of Bishops) ^{[self-published]}

Catholic Church titles
Preceded by Giovanni Canauli	Bishop of Fossombrone; 1612–1627	Succeeded by Benedetto Landi
