= Benedetto Landi =

Catholic prelate (1578–1638)

Most Reverend Benedetto Landi
- Bishop of Fossombrone
- Church: Catholic Church
- Diocese: Diocese of Fossombrone
- In office: 1628–1632
- Predecessor: Lorenzo Landi
- Successor: Giovanni Battista Landi

Orders
- Consecration: 13 June 1628 by Antonio Marcello Barberini

Personal details
- Born: 1578 Velletri, Italy
- Died: 1638 (aged 59–60)

Benedetto Landi (1578–1638) was a Catholic prelate who served as Bishop of Fossombrone (1628–1632).

== Biography ==
Benedetto Landi was born in Velletri, Italy in 1578. On 5 June 1628, he was appointed during the papacy of Pope Urban VIII as Bishop of Fossombrone. On 13 June 1628, he was consecrated bishop by Antonio Marcello Barberini, Bishop of Senigallia, with Lorenzo Azzolini, Bishop of Ripatransone, and Tiberio Cenci, Bishop of Jesi, serving as co-consecrators. He served as Bishop of Fossombrone until his resignation on 15 November 1632. He died in 1638.

== Episcopal succession ==
While bishop, he was the principal co-consecrator of:

- Ulderico Carpegna, Bishop of Gubbio (1630);
- Giovanni Battista Scanaroli, Titular Bishop of Sidon (1630);
- Tegrimus Tegrimi, Bishop of Assisi (1630);
- Giorgio Bolognetti, Bishop of Ascoli Satriano (1630);
- Cesare Raccagna, Bishop of Città di Castello (1632);
- Marco Antonio Cornaro, Bishop of Padua (1632);
- Amico Panici, Bishop of Sarsina (1632);
- Honoratus Caetani, Titular Patriarch of Alexandria (1633);
- Faustus Poli, Titular Archbishop of Amasea (1633);
- Torquato Perotti, Bishop of Amelia (1633);
- Francesco Maria Merlini, Bishop of Cervia (1635);
- Giovanni Battista Colonna, Titular Patriarch of Jerusalem (1636);
- Alessandro Cesarini (iuniore), Bishop of Viterbo e Tuscania (1636);
- Petras Parčevskis, Bishop of Smoleńsk (1636); and
- Alexander Sokołowski, Bishop of Kyiv (1636).

== External links and additional sources ==
- Cheney, David M. "Diocese of Fossombrone". Catholic-Hierarchy.org. (for Chronology of Bishops) ^{[self-published]}
- Chow, Gabriel. "Diocese of Fossombrone (Italy)". GCatholic.org. (for Chronology of Bishops) ^{[self-published]}

Catholic Church titles
Preceded by Lorenzo Landi	Bishop of Fossombrone; 1628–1632	Succeeded by Giovanni Battista Landi
