= Sebastiano Roberti =

Roman Catholic prelate

Most Reverend Sebastiano Roberti
- Bishop Emeritus of Tricarico
- Church: Catholic Church
- Diocese: Diocese of Tricarico
- In office: 1609–1611
- Predecessor: Diomede Carafa
- Successor: Roberto Roberti

Orders
- Consecration: 19 Mar 1609 by Giambattista Leni

Personal details
- Born: 1573
- Died: 19 Dec 1668 (age 95)

Sebastiano Roberti or Settimio Vittori (1573–1668) was a Roman Catholic prelate who served as Bishop of Tricarico (1609–1611).

== Biography ==
Sebastiano Roberti was born in 1573. On 11 Mar 1609, he was appointed during the papacy of Pope Paul V as Bishop of Tricarico. On 19 Mar 1609, he was consecrated bishop by Giambattista Leni, Bishop of Mileto, with Giuseppe de Rossi, Archbishop of Acerenza e Matera, and Domenico Rivarola, Bishop of Aleria, serving as co-consecrators. He served as Bishop of Tricarico until his resignation in 1611. He died on 19 Dec 1668.

== External links and additional sources ==
- Cheney, David M. "Diocese of Tricarico". Catholic-Hierarchy.org. (for Chronology of Bishops) ^{[self-published]}
- Chow, Gabriel. "Diocese of Tricarico (Italy)". GCatholic.org. (for Chronology of Bishops) ^{[self-published]}

Catholic Church titles
Preceded by Diomede Carafa	Bishop of Tricarico; 1609–1611	Succeeded by Roberto Roberti
