= Paul of Middelburg =

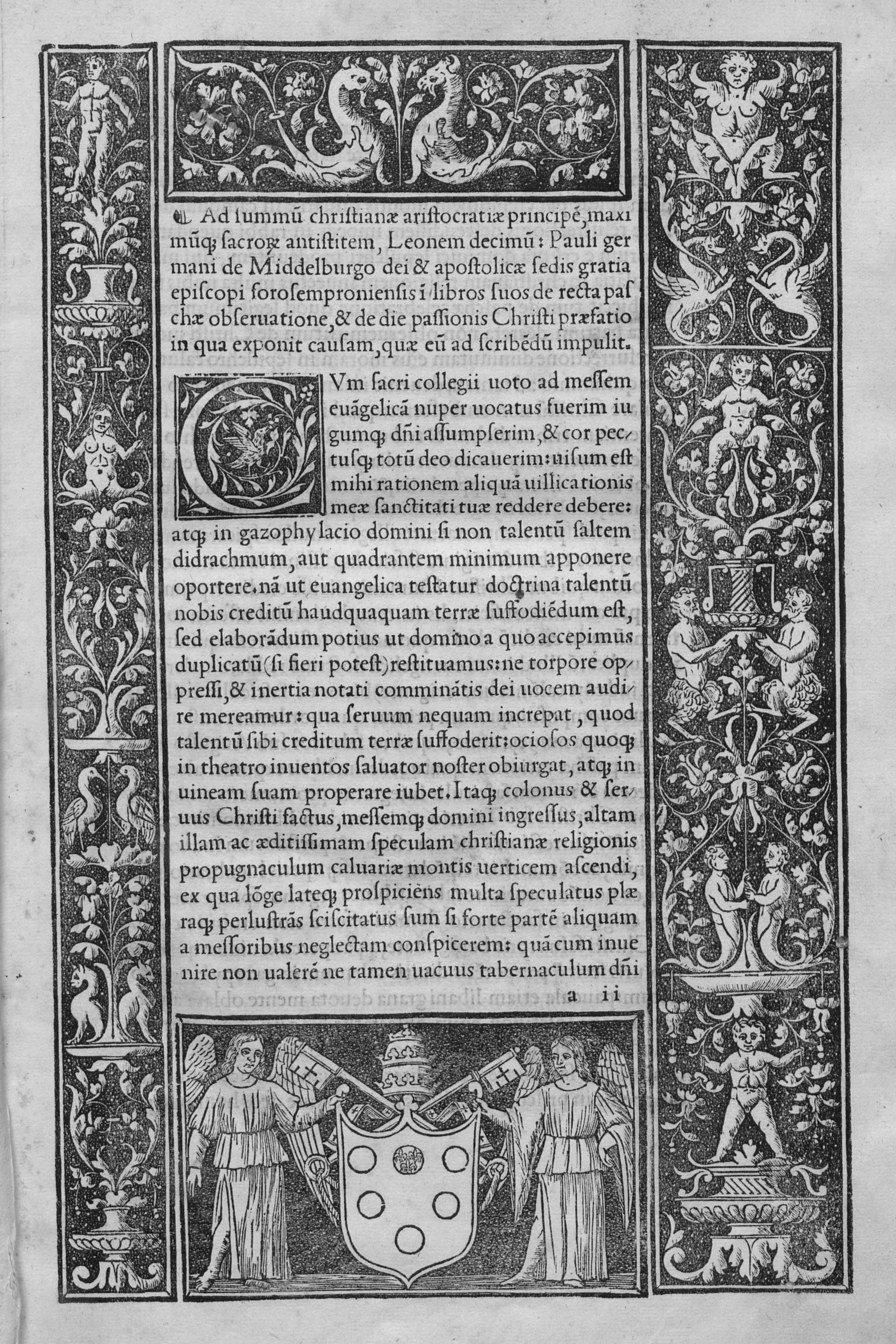
De recta Paschae celebratione

Paul of Middelburg (1446 – 13 December 1534) was a scientist from Zeeland and bishop of Fossombrone.

== Biography and work ==
Paul was born in 1446 at Middelburg, the ancient capital of the province of Zeeland, belonging then to the Holy Roman Empire, now to the Netherlands. His family name is unknown, but in one place he is called Paolo di Adriano. Julius Caesar Scaliger, his godson, called him "Omnium sui sæculi mathematicorum ... facile princeps" (easily the Prince of the mathematicians of his century).

After finishing his studies in Leuven he received a canonry in his native town, of which he was afterwards deprived. The circumstances of this fact are not known, but in his apologetic letter on the celebration of Easter he calls it an usurpation, and shows great bitterness against his country, calling it "barbara Zelandiæ insula", "vervecum patria", "cerdonum regio", etc.

He then taught for a while in Leuven, was invited by the Signoria of Venice to take a chair for sciences in Padua (1480), travelled through Italy, became physician to Francesco Maria I della Rovere, Duke of Urbino, and friend to Maximilian, Archduke of Austria, afterwards emperor. By the former he was endowed with the Benedictine Abbey St. Christophorus in Castel Durante in 1488, and by the latter he was recommended to Alexander VI for the Bishopric of Fossombrone (Moroni, LXXXV, 314). Being nominated to that see, in 1494, he destroyed some of his former publications; first "Giudizio dell' anno 1480", in which he had censured a number of mathematicians; then a "Practica de pravis Constellationibus", and a defence of that work against the nephew of Paul II (1484); and finally an "Invectiva in superstitiosum Vatem". He chose for himself an astronomical coat of arms, and, in 1497, enlarged and embellished the episcopal palace.

Besides some smaller treatises against usurers and against the superstitious fear of a flood in 1524 (Fossombrone, 1523), he wrote important works on the reform of the Calendar, which procured for him invitations by popes Julius II and Leo X to the Fifth Lateran Council (1512–1518). The contents and result of the work are described under Aloysius Lilius. He also exchanged letters with Copernicus.

Paul died while assisting at the Divine Office in Rome on 13 December 1534, and was buried in S. Maria dell' Anima.

== Works ==
His "Epistola ad Universitatem Lovaniensem de Paschate recte observando" (1487) was followed by an "Epistola apologetica" (1488), and finally by his principal work "Paulina, de recta Pasch celebratione" (Fossombrone, 1513).

== See also ==
- List of Roman Catholic scientist-clerics

== Sources ==
- De Ceuleneer, Adolf (1910), "Paulus van Middelburg en de Kalenderhervorming," (in Dutch). in: Handelingen van het eerste Taal- en Geschiedkundig Congres (Antwerp 1910), pp. 276-289.
- Hoogendoorn, K. (2018). Bibliography of the Exact Sciences in the Low Countries from ca. 1470 to the Golden Age (1700). Leiden: Brill 2018, pp. 654-655.
- Northaft, C. Philipp E. Scandalous Error: Calendar Reform and Calendrical Astronomy in Medieval Europe (Oxford University Press 2018), pp. 282-283.
- Paulus van Middelburg (1488). Epistola apologetica magistri Pauli de Middelburgo ad doctores Louanienses. (in Latin). Louvain: Ioannem de Westfalia.
- Paulus van Middelburg (1516). Secundum compendium correctionis calendarij continens et exponens diuersos modos corrigendi calendarium pro recte pasche celebratione,. (in Latin). Rome: M. Franck 1516.
- Struik, Dirk Jan. "Paulus van Middelburg (1445-1533)," (in Dutch), in: Mededeelingen van het Nederlandsch Historisch Instituut te Rome, Vol. 5 (1925), pp. 79-118.
- Struik, Dirk Jan (1925). Paulus van Middelburg 1445-1533. (in Dutch). Martinus Nijhoff, 1925.
