= Giuseppe Ferrerio =

Roman Catholic prelate

Most Reverend Giuseppe Ferrerio
- Archbishop of Urbino
- Church: Catholic Church
- Archdiocese: Archdiocese of Urbino
- In office: 1597–1610
- Predecessor: Antonio Giannotti da Montagnana
- Successor: Benedetto Ala
- Previous post: Titular Archbishop of Colossae (1593–1597)

Personal details
- Born: 1554 Savona, Italy
- Died: 16 March 1610 (aged 55–56) Urbino, Italy

Giuseppe Ferrerio (1554–1610) was a Roman Catholic prelate who served as Archbishop of Urbino (1597–1610) and Titular Archbishop of Colossae (1593–1597).

== Biography ==
Giuseppe Ferrerio was born in Savona, Italy in 1554. On 15 March 1593, he was appointed during the papacy of Pope Clement VIII as Titular Archbishop of Colossae and Coadjutor Archbishop of Urbino. In 1597, he succeeded to the bishopric. He served as Archbishop of Urbino until his death on 16 March 1610.

== Episcopal succession ==
While bishop, he was the principal co-consecrator of:

- Honoré du Laurens, Archbishop of Embrun (1601);
- Antoine Rose, Bishop of Senlis (1601);
- Stefano Spínola, Bishop of Ventimiglia (1602);
- Salvat d'Iharse, Bishop of Tarbes (1602);
- François L’Archiver, Bishop of Rennes (1602);
- Gabriel de L'Aubespine, Bishop of Orléans (1604);
- Antoine de Coues, Titular Bishop of Auzia and Coadjutor Bishop of Condom (1604);
- Diodato Gentile, Bishop of Caserta (1604); and
- Alessandro di Sangro, Titular Patriarch of Alexandria (1604)

== External links and additional sources ==
- Cheney, David M. "Archdiocese of Urbino-Urbania-Sant'Angelo in Vado". Catholic-Hierarchy.org. (for Chronology of Bishops) ^{[self-published]}
- Chow, Gabriel. "Archdiocese of Urbino-Urbania-Sant'Angelo in Vado". GCatholic.org. (for Chronology of Bishops) ^{[self-published]}
- Cheney, David M. "Colossae (Titular See)". Catholic-Hierarchy.org. (for Chronology of Bishops) ^{[self-published]}
- Chow, Gabriel. "Titular Archiepiscopal See of Colossæ (Turkey)". GCatholic.org. (for Chronology of Bishops) ^{[self-published]}

Catholic Church titles
Preceded by Ascanio I Piccolomini	Titular Archbishop of Colossae; 1593–1597	Succeeded by Giovanni Garzia Mellini
Preceded by Antonio Giannotti da Montagnana	Archbishop of Urbino; 1597–1610	Succeeded by Benedetto Ala
