= Benedetto Ala =

17th-century Roman Catholic bishop

Most Reverend Benedetto Ala
- Archbishop of Urbino
- Church: Catholic Church
- Archdiocese: Archdiocese of Urbino
- In office: 1610–1620
- Predecessor: Giuseppe Ferrerio
- Successor: Ottavio Accoramboni

Orders
- Consecration: 9 May 1610 by Michelangelo Tonti

Personal details
- Born: Cremona, Italy
- Died: 27 April 1620

Benedetto Ala (died 1620) was a Roman Catholic prelate who served as Archbishop of Urbino (1610–1620).

== Biography ==
Benedetto Ala was born in Cremona, Italy. On 5 May 1610, he was appointed during the papacy of Pope Paul V as Archbishop of Urbino. On 9 May 1610, he was consecrated bishop by Michelangelo Tonti, Bishop of Cesena, with Metello Bichi, Bishop Emeritus of Sovana, and Alessandro Borghi, Bishop Emeritus of Sansepolcro, serving as co-consecrators. He served as Archbishop of Urbino until his death on 27 Apr 1620.

== External links and additional sources ==
- Cheney, David M. "Archdiocese of Urbino-Urbania-Sant'Angelo in Vado". Catholic-Hierarchy.org. (for Chronology of Bishops) ^{[self-published]}
- Chow, Gabriel. "Archdiocese of Urbino-Urbania-Sant'Angelo in Vado (Italy)". GCatholic.org. (for Chronology of Bishops) ^{[self-published]}

Catholic Church titles
Preceded by Giuseppe Ferrerio	Archbishop of Urbino; 1610–1620	Succeeded by Ottavio Accoramboni
