= Roberti =

Roberti may refer to:

- Roberti (surname), Italian surname
- Roberti–Roos Assault Weapons Control Act of 1989, a California law

== Other ==
- Alloperla roberti, species of insect in the family Chloroperlidae
- Amphisbaena roberti, species of worm lizard in the family Amphisbaenidae
- Avenionia roberti, aquatic gastropod mollusk or micromollusk in the family Hydrobiidae
- Conasprella roberti, marine gastropod mollusk in the family Conidae
- Oecomys roberti, rodent species from South America in the genus Oecomys
- Pseudambassis roberti, species of fish in the family Ambassidae
