= Roberto Roberti (bishop) =

Italian Roman Catholic prelate

Most Reverend Roberto Roberti
- Bishop of Tricarico
- Church: Catholic Church
- Diocese: Diocese of Tricarico
- In office: 1611–1624
- Predecessor: Sebastiano Roberti
- Successor: Pier Luigi Carafa (seniore)

Orders
- Consecration: 8 Jan 1612 by Giambattista Leni

Personal details
- Born: 1575 Rome, Italy
- Died: Jan 1624 (age 49)

Roberto Roberti, O.P. or Roberto Vittori (1575–1624) was a Roman Catholic prelate who served as Bishop of Tricarico (1611–1624).

== Biography ==
Roberto Roberti was born in Rome, Italy in 1575 and ordained a priest in the Order of Preachers. On 5 Dec 1611, he was appointed during the papacy of Pope Paul V as Bishop of Tricarico. On 8 Jan 1612, he was consecrated bishop by Giambattista Leni, Bishop of Ferrara, with Giovanni Canauli, Bishop of Fossombrone, and Antonio Ricci, Bishop of Arezzo, serving as co-consecrators. He served as Bishop of Tricarico until his death in Jan 1624.

== External links and additional sources ==
- Cheney, David M. "Diocese of Tricarico". Catholic-Hierarchy.org. (for Chronology of Bishops) ^{[self-published]}
- Chow, Gabriel. "Diocese of Tricarico (Italy)". GCatholic.org. (for Chronology of Bishops) ^{[self-published]}

Catholic Church titles
Preceded by Sebastiano Roberti	Bishop of Tricarico; 1611–1624	Succeeded by Pier Luigi Carafa (seniore)
