= Ottavio Accoramboni =

Roman Catholic prelate

Most Reverend Ottavio Accoramboni
- Archbishop of Urbino
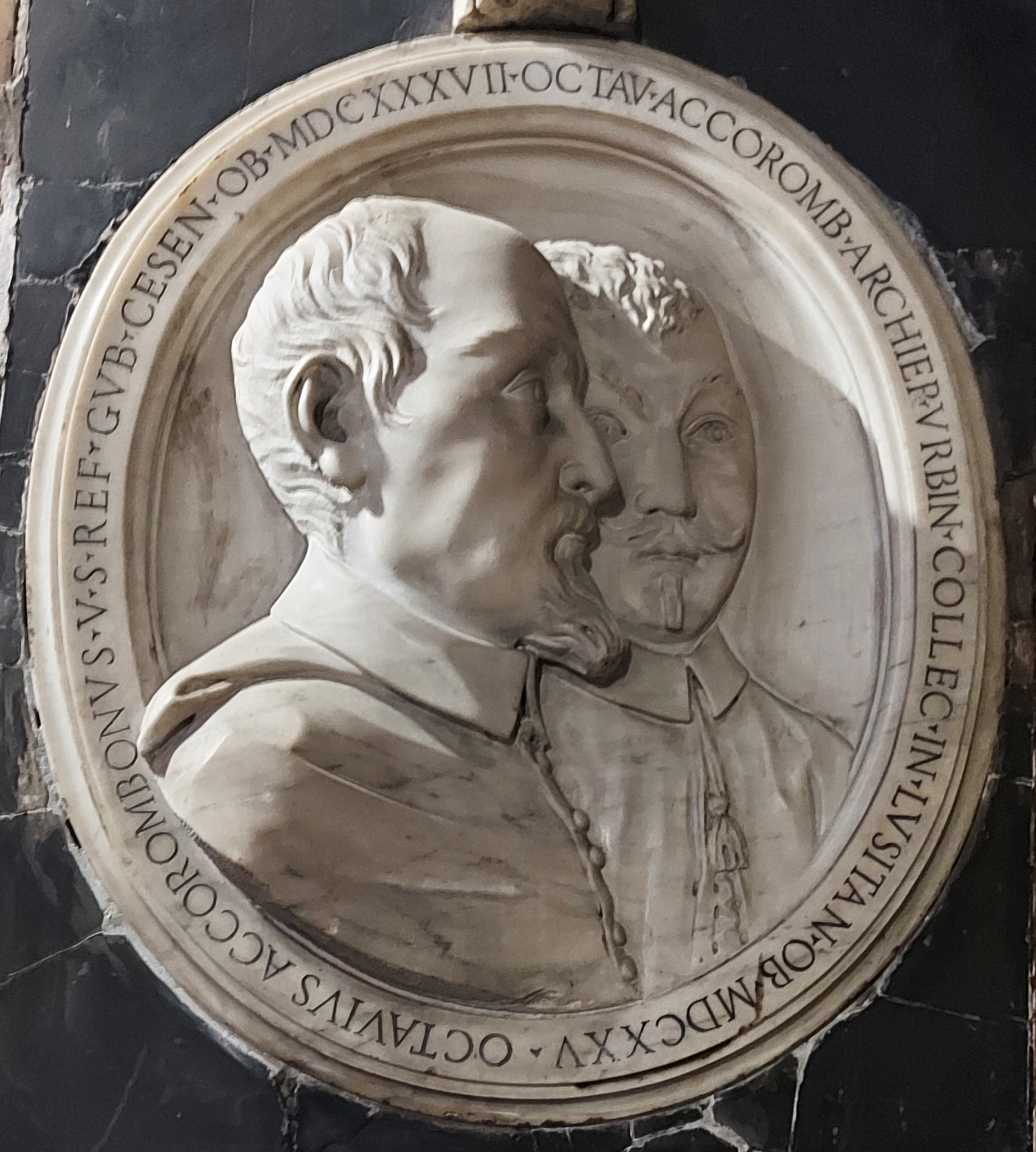
- in background the Ottavio bishop of Urbino
- Church: Catholic Church
- Archdiocese: Archdiocese of Urbino
- In office: 1621–1623
- Predecessor: Benedetto Ala
- Successor: Paolo Emilio Santori
- Previous posts: Bishop of Fossombrone (1579–1610); Apostolic Nuncio to Portugal (1614–1620)

Orders
- Consecration: 8 June 1579 (Bishop) by Card. Benedetto Lomellini

Personal details
- Born: 1549 Roma, Papal States
- Died: 23 May 1625 (aged 75–76) Roma, Papal States

Ottavio Accoramboni (1549 – 23 May 1625) was a Roman Catholic prelate who served as Archbishop of Urbino (1621–1623), Apostolic Nuncio to Portugal (1614–1620), and Bishop of Fossombrone (1579–1610).

== Biography ==
Ottavio Accoramboni was born in Rome in the first months of 1549, into a family of Gubbio. He studied at the Roman College by the Jesuits and at the University of Padua. His younger sister, Vittoria, married in 1573 Francesco Peretti, a nephew of Cardinal Montalto, who supported the ecclesiastic career of Ottavio. On 15 May 1579 he was appointed bishop of Fossombrone in the Duchy of Urbino. His episcopal consecration followed on 8 June in the Sistine Chapel by the hands of cardinal Benedetto Lomellini. He remained unrelated to the bloody events which involved his sister Vittoria. Ottavio resigned from his bishopric in 1610 and returned to live in Rome.

On 4 June 1614, he was appointed Apostolic Nuncio to Portugal. In Portugal Ottavio supported the action of the Jesuits in the Far East, and introduced the cult of Charles Borromeo and Frances of Rome: in particular on 27 June 1616 he organized a procession by boats from Aldeia Galega to Lisbon in honor of Saint Charles. The other main effort of Ottavio was to defend the interests of the Church and in particular he opposed the law that required a permit of the king for the ecclesiastics to buy real estates. To sanction violations of the Church's jurisdiction, on 27 June 1617 he imposed a general interdict in Portugal, which was left only on 30 May of the following year after the intervention of Rome.

On 4 June 1620 Vincenzo Landinelli was appointed as Nuncio in his place, but Ottavio remained in Portugal until the end of 1622. On 17 May 1621, he had been appointed Archbishop of Urbino, however he resigned in 1623 for health problems. He died in Rome on 23 May 1625, and he was buried in the church of San Gregorio al Celio. On about 1672 his relatives moved his tomb to the new erected family chapel in Sant'Andrea delle Fratte.

== Episcopal succession ==
Episcopal succession of Ottavio Accoramboni

While bishop, he was the principal consecrator of:

- Rodrigo da Cunha, Bishop of Portalegre (1615);
- Diogo Correia Valente, Bishop of Funay (1618);
- João Coutinho, Bishop of Faro (1618);

and the principal co-consecrator of:

- Florence Conry, Archbishop of Tuam (1609);
- Girolamo Giovannelli, Bishop of Sora (1609);
- Giovanni Canauli (Cannuli), Bishop of Fossombrone (1610);
- Malatesta Baglioni, Bishop of Pesaro (1612);
- Lorenzo Landi, Bishop of Fossombrone (1612);
- Fulgenzio Gallucci, Titular Bishop of Thagaste (1623);
- Giulio Cesare Sacchetti, Bishop of Gravina di Puglia (1623); and
- Giovanni Battista Indelli, Bishop of San Marco (1624).

Catholic Church titles
Preceded by Orazio Montegranelli	Bishop of Fossombrone; 1579–1610	Succeeded by Giovanni Canauli
Preceded by Gaspare Paluzzi degli Albertoni	Apostolic Nuncio to Portugal; 1614–1620	Succeeded by Vincenzo Landinelli
Preceded by Benedetto Ala	Archbishop of Urbino; 1621–1623	Succeeded by Paolo Emilio Santori
