= Lanfranco Margotti =

Italian Catholic cardinal (1558–1611)

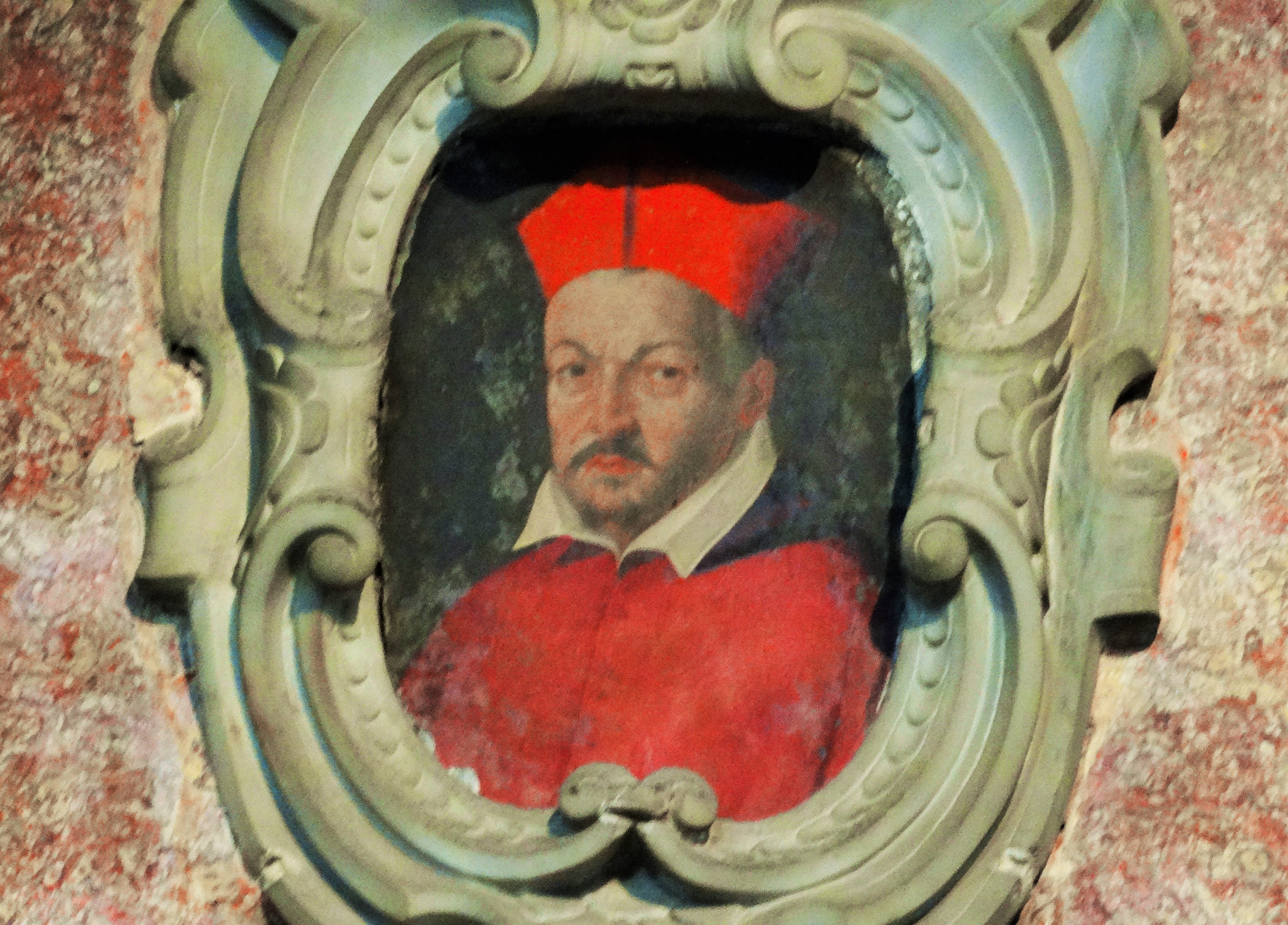

Lanfranco Margotti (1558–1611) was a Roman Catholic cardinal in the consistory of November 24, 1608 was created cardinal by Pope Paul V.

== Biography ==
He was born to a family of limited means in Parma, and gained the patronage of Cardinal Filippo Sega in Rome. He traveled as a secretary with the cardinal when he became legate to France. He then moved back to Rome to work under cardinal Cinzio Aldobrandini. Well praised for his skills, he rose in the papal bureaucracy till being appointed priest in 1608 and bishop in 1609 by Paul V Borghese. He was a cardinal for only three years.

Catholic Church titles
Preceded by Girolamo Matteucci	Bishop of Viterbo e Tuscania; 1609–1611	Succeeded by Tiberio Muti
Preceded by Cinzio Passeri Aldobrandini	Cardinal-Priest of San Pietro in Vincoli; 1610–1611	Succeeded by Bartolomeo Cesi
Preceded by Marco Antonio Maffei	Cardinal-Priest of San Callisto; 1608–1610	Succeeded by François de La Rochefoucauld
