= Rusticucci =

Rusticucci is a surname. Notable people with the surname include:

- Girolamo Rusticucci (1537–1603), Italian cardinal
- Iacopo Rusticucci (c. 1200 – after 1266), Florentine politician
- Ricardo Rusticucci (1946–2014), Argentine sport shooter
