= Ottaviano Raggi =

His Eminence Ottaviano Raggi
- cardinal priest of Sant'Agostino
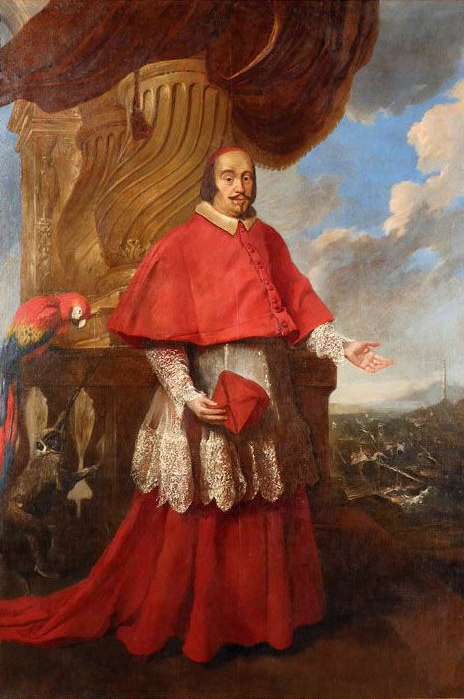
- Church: Catholic Church
- See: Bishop of Aleria
- Appointed: 12 January 1643
- Term ended: 31 December 1643
- Predecessor: Dezio Giustiniani
- Successor: Agostino Donghi

Orders
- Consecration: 1 February 1643 (Bishop) by Giandomenico Spinola
- Created cardinal: 16 December 1641 by Pope Urban VIII

Personal details
- Born: 31 December 1592 Genoa
- Died: 31 December 1643 (aged 51) Roma
- Buried: Church of the Gesù

Ottaviano Raggi (1592-1643) was a 17th-century Catholic cardinal. Before his appointment as Cardinal he rose in the ranks of civil and juridical administration of the Papal States and after he was one of the proponent of the Republic of Genoa into the College of Cardinals.

== Life ==
Ottaviano Raggi was born in Genoa on 31 December 1592.

Ottaviano completed his studies earning a doctorate in utroque iure in the University of Genoa. After graduation he moved to Rome and took up a career in the administration of the Papal States: in 1617 he was appointed Protonotary apostolic, in 1619 he became referendary of the Tribunals of the Apostolic Signature, in 1622 he became cleric of the Apostolic Camera. Between 1624 and 1625 he was in charge of the maintenance of the roads and streets of the Papal States, in 1626 he was appointed responsible for the customs. In 1629 he was appointed responsible for the provisions of foodstuffs in Rome, and he positively managed the famine of 1630.

From 1637 he was Auditor General of the Apostolic Camera, i.e. the Chief Judge of the high court competent for civil, ecclesiastical and penal issues related to the Roman Curia as well as superintendent of the important College of Notaries. As Auditor General on 26 September 1641 he issued an edict to inflict Excommunication to whichever people sided with Odoardo Farnese, Duke of Parma, so making the first formal move of the First War of Castro.

He kept that office up to 16 December 1641 when he was created Cardinal priest with the title of Sant'Agostino. On 12 January 1643 Raggi was appointed Bishop of Aleria in the island Corsica, at the time under the Republic of Genoa. The episcopal consecration followed on 1 February in the Basilica di Santa Maria Maggiore by the hands of Giandomenico Spinola.

He moved to his diocese in April 1643 and from May to November 1643 he lived in Bastia. In December he returned to Rome where he died on 31 December 1643 after the laborious travel. He was buried in the Church of the Gesù.
