= Marco Antonio Cornaro =

Italian Roman Catholic prelate (1583–1639)

Most Reverend Marco Antonio Cornaro
- Bishop of Padua
- Church: Catholic Church
- Diocese: Diocese of Padua
- In office: 1632–1639
- Predecessor: Federico Baldissera Bartolomeo Cornaro
- Successor: Luca Stella

Orders
- Consecration: 30 November 1632 by Antonio Marcello Barberini

Personal details
- Born: 1583 Venice, Italy
- Died: 1639 (age 56) Padua, Italy

Marco Antonio Cornaro or Marcantonio Corner (1583–1639) was a Roman Catholic prelate who served as Bishop of Padua (1632–1639).

== Biography ==
Marco Antonio Cornaro was born in Venice, Italy in 1583. On 15 November 1632, he was appointed during the papacy of Pope Urban VIII as Bishop of Padua. On 30 November 1632, he was consecrated bishop by Antonio Marcello Barberini, Cardinal-Priest of Sant'Onofrio, with Benedetto Landi, Bishop Emeritus of Fossombrone, and Angelo Castellari, Bishop of Caorle, serving as co-consecrators. He served as Bishop of Padua until his death in 1639.

== External links and additional sources ==
- Cheney, David M. "Diocese of Padova {Padua}". Catholic-Hierarchy.org. (for Chronology of Bishops) ^{[self-published]}
- Chow, Gabriel. "Diocese of Padova (Italy)". GCatholic.org. (for Chronology of Bishops) ^{[self-published]}

Catholic Church titles
Preceded by Federico Baldissera Bartolomeo Cornaro	Bishop of Padua; 1632–1639	Succeeded by Luca Stella
