= Tiberio Muti =

Italian Roman Catholic cardinal

His Eminence Tiberio Muti
- Cardinal-Priest of Santa Prisca; Bishop of Viterbo e Tuscania
- Church: Catholic Church

Orders
- Consecration: 15 Jan 1612 by Scipione Caffarelli-Borghese
- Created cardinal: 2 Dec 1615
- Rank: Cardinal-Priest

Personal details
- Born: 1574 Rome, Italy
- Died: 14 Apr 1636 (age 62)

Tiberio Muti (1574–1636) was a Roman Catholic cardinal.

== Biography ==
On 15 Jan 1612, he was consecrated bishop by Scipione Caffarelli-Borghese, Archbishop of Bologna, with Fabio Biondi, Titular Patriarch of Jerusalem, and Antonio Ricci, Bishop of Arezzo, serving as co-consecrators.

== Episcopal succession ==
Episcopal succession of Tiberio Muti

While bishop, he was the principal consecrator of:

- Dionisio Martini, Bishop of Nepi e Sutri (1616);
- Alexander Liparuli, Bishop of Guardialfiera (1624);
- Giovanni Maria Belletti, Bishop of Gerace (1625);
- Theodorus Pelleoni, Bishop of Montepeloso (1627); and
- Antonio Santacroce, Titular Archbishop of Seleucia in Isauria and Apostolic Nuncio to Poland (1627).

Catholic Church titles
Preceded by Lanfranco Margotti	Bishop of Viterbo e Tuscania; 1599–1613	Succeeded by Alessandro Cesarini (iuniore)
Preceded by Carlo Conti (cardinal)	Cardinal-Priest of Santa Prisca; 1616–1636	Succeeded by Francesco Adriano Ceva
