= Paolo Oberti =

Most Reverend Paolo Oberti
- Bishop of Venosa
- Church: Catholic Church
- Diocese: Diocese of Venosa
- In office: 1567
- Predecessor: Francesco Rusticucci
- Successor: Giovanni Antonio Locatelli

Orders
- Consecration: 24 February 1567 by Marcantonio Maffei

Personal details
- Died: 13 September 1567 Venosa, Italy

Paolo Oberti, O.P. (died 1567) was a Roman Catholic prelate who served as Bishop of Venosa (1567).

== Biography ==
Paolo Oberti was ordained a priest in the Dominican Order. On 17 February 1567, he was appointed during the papacy of Pope Pius V as Bishop of Venosa.

On 24 February 1567, he was consecrated bishop by Marcantonio Maffei, Archbishop of Chieti, with Antonio Fioribello, Bishop Emeritus of Lavello, and Egidio Valenti, Bishop of Nepi e Sutri, serving as co-consecrators. He served as Bishop of Venosa until his death on 13 September 1567.

== External links and additional sources ==
- Cheney, David M. "Diocese of Venosa". Catholic-Hierarchy.org. (for Chronology of Bishops) ^{[self-published]}
- Chow, Gabriel. "Diocese of Venosa". GCatholic.org. (for Chronology of Bishops) ^{[self-published]}

Catholic Church titles
Preceded by Francesco Rusticucci	Bishop of Venosa; 1567	Succeeded by Giovanni Antonio Locatelli
