= Pier Luigi Carafa (bishop) =

Italian catholic bishop

Most Reverend Pier Luigi Carafa
- Bishop of Tricarico
- Church: Catholic Church
- Diocese: Diocese of Tricarico
- In office: 1646–1672
- Predecessor: Pier Luigi Carafa
- Successor: Andrea Francolisio d'Aquino

Orders
- Consecration: 14 January 1646 by Pier Luigi Carafa

Personal details
- Died: 7 August 1672 Tricarico, Italy

Pier Luigi Carafa (died 7 August 1672) was a Roman Catholic prelate who served as Bishop of Tricarico (1646–1672).

== Biography ==
On 8 January 1646, he was appointed during the papacy of Pope Alexander VII as Bishop of Tricarico. On 14 January 1646, he was consecrated bishop by Pier Luigi Carafa (seniore), Cardinal-Priest of Santi Silvestro e Martino ai Monti, with Ranuccio Scotti Douglas, Bishop of Borgo San Donnino, and Ascanio Cassiani, Bishop of Andria, serving as co-consecrators. He served as Bishop of Tricarico until his death on 7 August 1672. While bishop, he was the principal co-consecrator of Giovanni Battista Brescia, Bishop of Vicenza (1655).

== External links and additional sources ==
- Cheney, David M. "Diocese of Tricarico". Catholic-Hierarchy.org. (for Chronology of Bishops) ^{[self-published]}
- Chow, Gabriel. "Diocese of Tricarico (Italy)". GCatholic.org. (for Chronology of Bishops) ^{[self-published]}

Catholic Church titles
Preceded by Pier Luigi Carafa	Bishop of Tricarico; 1646–1672	Succeeded by Andrea Francolisio d'Aquino
