= Niccolò Ardinghelli =

Italian Catholic cardinal (1502–1547)

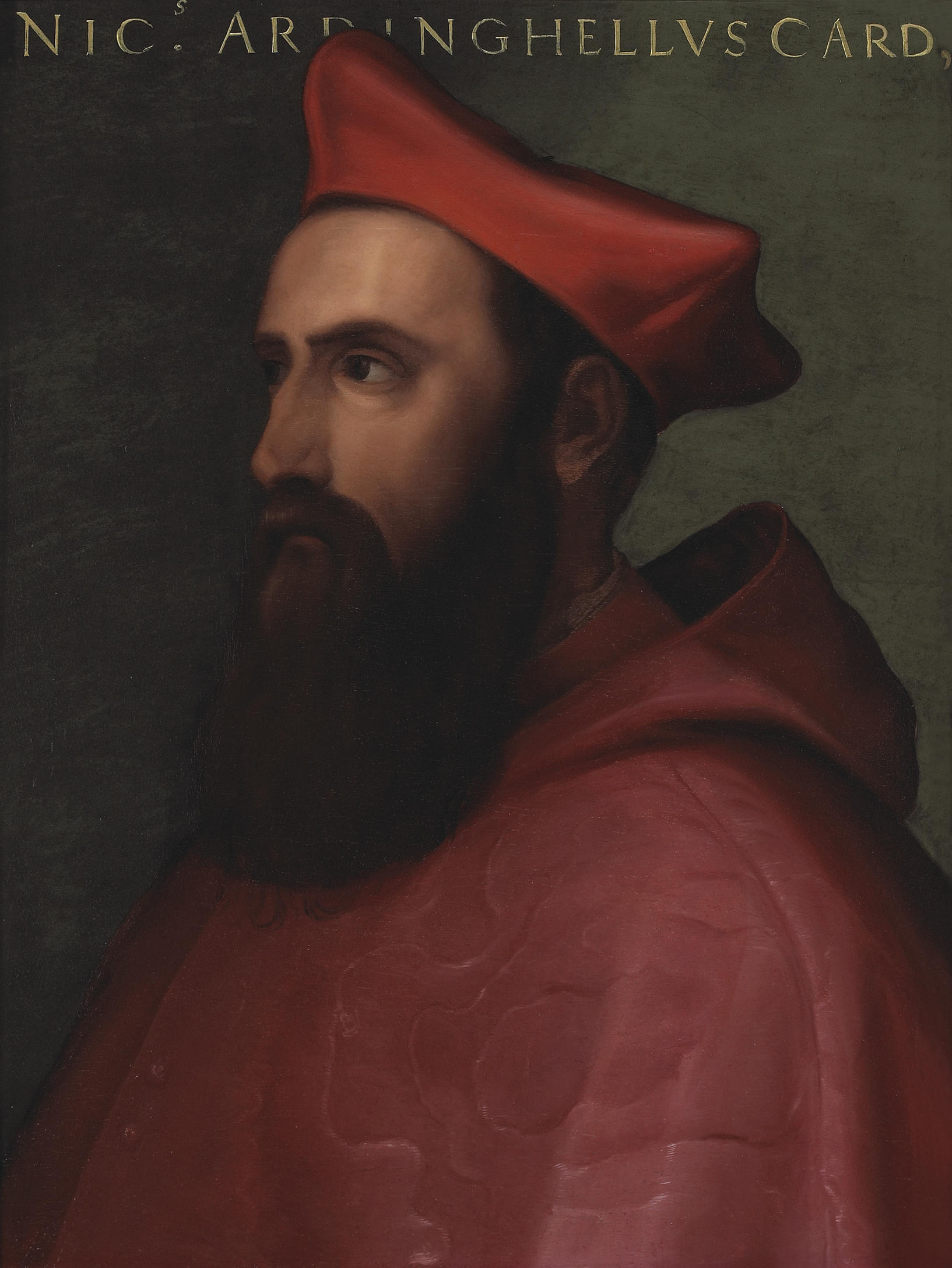
Niccolò Ardinghelli

Niccolò Ardinghelli (1502–1547) was an Italian Roman Catholic bishop and cardinal.

== Biography ==
Niccolò Ardinghelli was born in Florence in 1502, the son of a noble family. As a young man, he studied Latin, Ancient Greek, and law.

He began his career as a secretary to Cardinal Alessandro Farnese, iuniore. He was a canon of Florence Cathedral. In 1539, he became vicar of Marche. He became a datary in 1540. He was also a protonotary apostolic.

On 13 July 1541, he was elected Bishop of Fossombrone. He was despatched as nuncio to Francis I of France to encourage peace negotiations with Charles V, Holy Roman Emperor and promote support for holding an ecumenical council. He traveled in the accompany of Cardinal Farnese, who was papal legate to the Kingdom of France and the Kingdom of Spain.

Pope Paul III made him a cardinal priest in the consistory of 19 December 1544. He received the red hat and the titular church of Sant'Apollinare alle Terme Neroniane-Alessandrine. In 1545, he became Prefect of the Apostolic Signatura. He resigned the government of the Diocese of Fossombrone on 16 March 1547.

He died in the Palazzo Baldassini on 23 August 1547. He was buried in Santa Maria sopra Minerva.

== See also ==
- Catholic Church in Italy
