= Diomede Carafa (bishop of Tricarico) =

Roman Catholic prelate

Most Reverend Diomede Carafa
- Bishop of Tricarico
- Church: Catholic Church
- Diocese: Diocese of Tricarico
- In office: 1605–1609
- Predecessor: Ottavio Mirto Frangipani
- Successor: Sebastiano Roberti

Orders
- Consecration: 28 August 1605 by Pietro Aldobrandini

Personal details
- Died: 12 January 1609 Rome, Italy

Diomede Carafa (died 1609) was a Roman Catholic prelate who served as Bishop of Tricarico (1605–1609).

== Biography ==
On 17 August 1605, Diomede Carafa was appointed during the papacy of Pope Paul V as Bishop of Tricarico. On 28 August 1605, he was consecrated bishop by Pietro Aldobrandini, Archbishop of Ravenna, with Paolo Alberi, Archbishop Emeritus of Dubrovnik, and Metello Bichi, Bishop of Sovana, serving as co-consecrators. He served as Bishop of Tricarico until his death on 12 January 1609 in Rome.

== External links and additional sources ==
- Cheney, David M. "Diocese of Tricarico". Catholic-Hierarchy.org. (for Chronology of Bishops) ^{[self-published]}
- Chow, Gabriel. "Diocese of Tricarico (Italy)". GCatholic.org. (for Chronology of Bishops) ^{[self-published]}

Catholic Church titles
Preceded by Ottavio Mirto Frangipani	Bishop of Tricarico; 1605–1609	Succeeded by Sebastiano Roberti
