= Marcantonio Maffei =

Italian bishop and cardinal (1521-1583)

- Prefect of the Congregation of Bishops and Regulars
- Church: Catholic Church
- In office: 1576 – 22 August 1583
- Predecessor: Position established
- Successor: Nicolas de Pellevé
- Other post: Cardinal-Priest of San Callisto (1570-1583)
- Previous posts: Datary of the Apostolic Datary (1566-1570); Archbishop of Chieti (1553-1568); Viceregent of Diocese of Rome (1560-1566)

Orders
- Created cardinal: 17 May 1570 by Pope Pius V

Personal details
- Born: 29 November 1521 Bergamo, Domini di Terraferma, Republic of Venice
- Died: 22 August 1583 (aged 61) Rome, Papal States

Marcantonio Maffei (29 November 1521 – 22 August 1583) was an Italian Roman Catholic bishop and cardinal.

== Background ==
Marcantonio Maffei was born in Bergamo on 29 November 1521, the son of nobles Girolamo Maffei and Antonia Mattei. His older brother Bernardino Maffei was also a cardinal, as were his nephews Orazio Maffei and Marcello Lante.

He was educated at the University of Ferrara, becoming a doctor of both laws in September 1547. He then moved to Rome and in 1549, became a consistorial lawyer. He also became a canon of the Archbasilica of St. John Lateran. In 1552, he was vice-governor of Viterbo.

== Archbishop of Chieti ==
He was elected Archbishop of Chieti on 14 July 1553; he succeeded his brother Bernardino Maffei as archbishop. Around 1554, he became a Referendary of the Apostolic Signatura. He was the Governor of Viterbo from 27 September 1555 until 1557. From 1560 until January 1566, he was the vicegerent of the Vicar General of Rome; he later served as Vicar General of Rome. Pope Pius V made him his nuncio before the Kingdom of Poland. In 1566, he was appointed Datary of His Holiness, maintaining that position until 1570. Sometime before 14 January 1568 he resigned the administration of his archbishopric. Following the death of Maffei's brother Achille, Maffei was given his canonry in St. Peter's Basilica on 29 July 1568. He became a Domestic Chaplain of His Holiness in October 1569.

== Cardinal Priest ==
Pope Pius V made him a cardinal priest in the consistory of 17 May 1570. He received the red hat and the titular church of San Callisto.

He attended the papal conclave of 1572 that elected Pope Gregory XIII. Under the new pope he was the Prefect of the Chancery of Apostolic Briefs.

He died in Rome on 22 August 1583. He was buried in Santa Maria sopra Minerva.

== Episcopal succession ==
While bishop, he was the principal consecrator of:

- Angelo Cattani da Diacceto, Bishop of Fiesole (1566);
- Paolo Oberti, Bishop of Venosa (1567);
- Girolamo Cardinal Rusticucci, Bishop of Senigallia (1570);
- Ludovico de Torres, Archbishop of Monreale (1573);

and the principal co-consecrator of:

- Giovanni Oliva, Archbishop of Chieti (1568);
- Annibal de Ruccellai, Bishop of Carcassonne (1569); and
- Girolamo di Corregio, Archbishop of Taranto (1570).
