= Diocese of Fano-Fossombrone-Cagli-Pergola =

Roman Catholic diocese in Italy

Coordinates: 43.8435°N 13.0198°E

Diocese of Fano-Fossombrone-Cagli-Pergola Dioecesis Fanensis-Forosemproniensis-Calliensis-Pergulana

Catholic
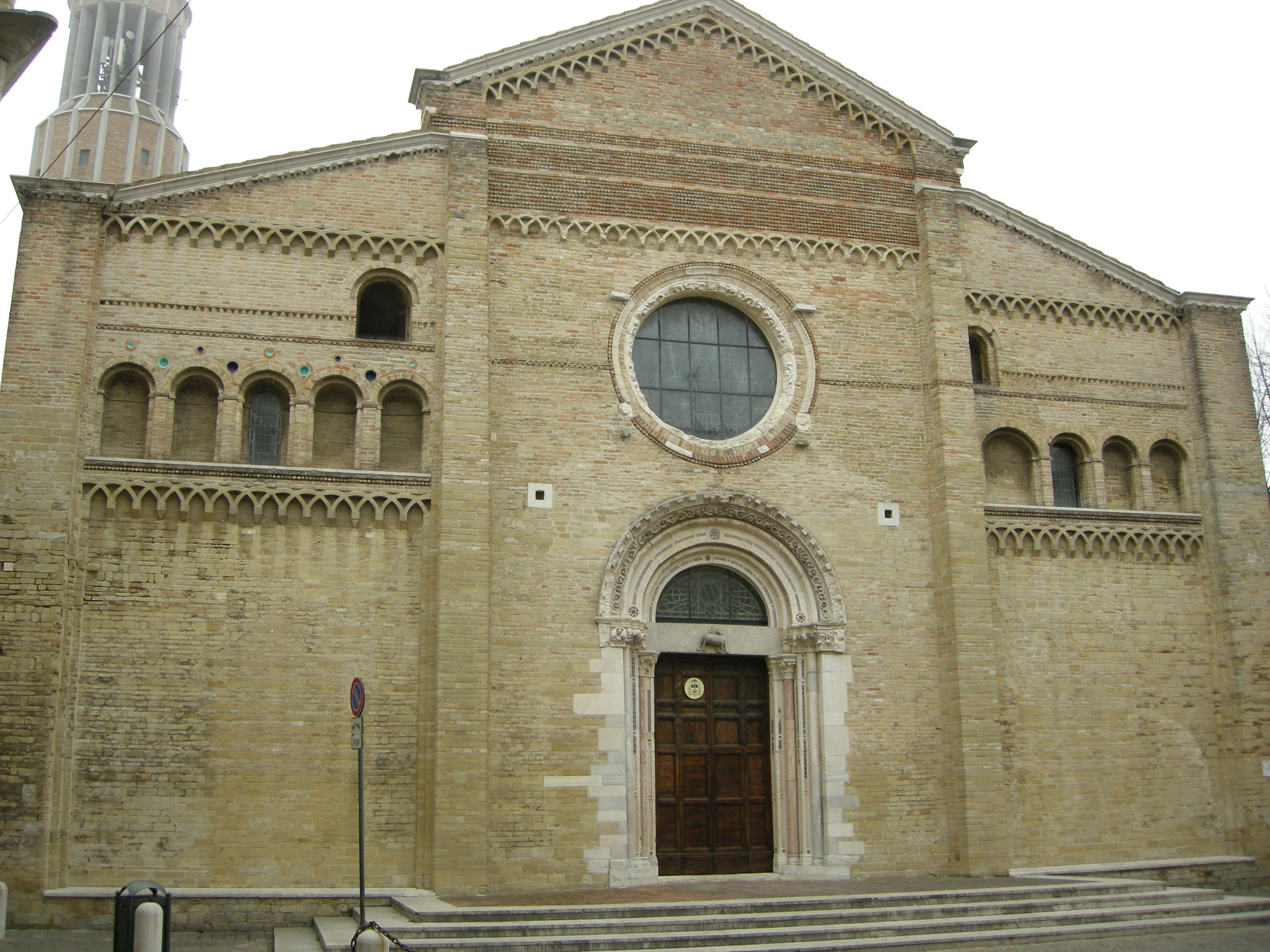
- Cathedral in Fano

Location
- Country: Italy
- Ecclesiastical province: Pesaro

Statistics
- Area: 1,100 km^{2} (420 sq mi)
- Population: Total; Catholics: (as of 2021); 142,850; 137,850 (guess)
- Parishes: 74

Information
- Denomination: Catholic Church
- Rite: Roman Rite
- Established: 4th century
- Cathedral: Basilica Cattedrale di S. Maria Maggiore (Fano)
- Co-cathedral: Concattedrale di Ss. Aldebrando e Agostino (Fossombrone); Concattedrale di S. Maria Assunta (Cagli); Concattedrale di S. Andrea (Pergola)
- Secular priests: 80 (diocesan); 35 (Religious Orders); 19 Permanent Deacons

Current leadership
- Pope: Leo XIV
- Bishop: Andrea Andreozzi
- Bishops emeritus: Armando Trasarti

Map

Website
- www.fanodiocesi.it

The Diocese of Fano-Fossombrone-Cagli-Pergola (Latin: Dioecesis Fanensis-Forosemproniensis-Calliensis-Pergulana) is a Latin diocese of the Catholic Church in Italy, created in 1986, when the historical Diocese of Fano was united to the Diocese of Cagli e Pergola and the Diocese of Fossombrone. It is a suffragan of the Archdiocese of Pesaro.

== History ==
S. Paternianus is credited with being the first Bishop of Fano, and are supposed to have been appointed by Pope Sylvester I (314–335). Eusebius accompanied Pope John I to Constantinople in 524, and may have been killed along with the Pope on their return in 526.

Among the later bishops were Riccardo (1214), persecuted by the magistrate Alberghetti; and the Dominican Pietro Bertano (1537), an orator and advocate at the Council of Trent.

=== Chapter and cathedral ===
In 1111, the cathedral and the Canonica were destroyed by fire. Rebuilding began in 1113.

Bishop Carbo was the first to grant the Canons of the cathedral the right to use the title canonicati, on 6 September 1165, and he recognized all their rights and privileges. These had already been confirmed by Pope Eugenius III in 1152, and were confirmed again by Pope Urban III in 1186, by Pope Honorius III in 1218, and by Pope Julius II in 1504.

The cathedral Chapter was composed of two dignities (the Provost and the Archdeacon) and twelve Canons, one of whom is called the Poenitentiarius and another the Theologus, as mandated by the Council of Trent. The cathedral is a parish church, and the Provost is the parish priest. One of the chaplains of the cathedral acts as his curate.

=== Synods ===
A diocesan synod was an irregularly held, but important, meeting of the bishop of a diocese and his clergy. Its purpose was (1) to proclaim generally the various decrees already issued by the bishop; (2) to discuss and ratify measures on which the bishop chose to consult with his clergy; (3) to publish statutes and decrees of the diocesan synod, of the provincial synod, and of the Holy See.

Bishop Giulio Ottinelli (1587–1603) held a diocesan synod in Fano on 16 August 1593. Bishop Angelo Maria Ranuzzi (1678–1688) held a diocesan synod on 30 June 1680. Bishop Taddeo Luigi dal Verme (1688–1696) presided over a diocesan synod on 29 May 1692. On 5 November 1702, Bishop Giovanni Battista Giberti (1696–1720) held a diocesan synod. Bishop Giacomo Beni (1733–1764) held a diocesan synod in 1740.

=== Reorganization of dioceses ===
In a decree of the Second Vatican Council, it was recommended that dioceses be reorganized to take into account modern developments. A project begun on orders from Pope John XXIII, and continued under his successors, was intended to reduce the number of dioceses in Italy and to rationalize their borders in terms of modern population changes and shortages of clergy. The change was made urgent because of changes made to the Concordat between the Italian State and the Holy See on 18 February 1984, and embodied in a law of 3 June 1985. The change was approved by Pope John Paul II in an audience of 27 September 1986, and by a decree of the Sacred Congregation of Bishops of the Papal Curia on 30 September 1986. The diocese of Fano was united to the dioceses of Cagli and Pergola and of Fossombrone. Its name was to be Fanensis-Forosemproniensis-Calliensis-Pergulanus. The seat of the diocese was to be in Fano. The former cathedral in Cagli and the former cathedral in Fossombrone were to have the honorary title of co-cathedral, and their chapters were to be the Capitulum Concathedralis. There was to be only one episcopal curia, one seminary, one ecclesiastical tribunal; and all the clergy were to be incardinated in the diocese of Fano-Fossombrone-Caglia-Pergola. The combined diocese was suffragan of the Archdiocese of Urbino-Urbania-Sant'Angelo in Vado.

In 2000, the Archdiocese of Urbino was deprived of its metropolitan status, and both Urbino and Fano became suffragans of the metropolitan Archdiocese of Pesaro.

== Bishops ==
=== Diocese of Fano ===
==== Before 1200 ====
- Paternianus

...

- Vitalis (attested 499)
- Eusebius (attested 502, 525)

...

- Leo (attested 596)
- Fortunatus (attested 596)

[Ursus]
...

- Scholasticius (attested 649)

...

- Dominicus (attested 680)

...

- Armatus (attested 743)
- Mauro (attested 769)

...

- Agipertus (attested 826)

...

- Joannes (attested 851, 877)
- Marcus (attested 877)
- Romanus (attested 887, 904)

...

- Richardus (attested 967)

Gerardus ?

- Rainaldus (attested 1010)
- Albertus (1027–1048)

Hugo (1036–1048)

- Arduinus (1048–c. 1085)
- Petrus (1090–1135)
- Rainaldus (1136–1165)
- Carbo (attested 1165–1177)
- Monaldus (1178–1214)

=== 1200–1500 ===
- Ricardus (attested 1214, 1218, 1227)
- Gregorius da Faenza, O.P. (1240–1244?)
- Foscardus (1244–1245 ?)
- Adjutus (attested 1245, 1257)
- Morandus, O.P. (1265–1275)

Sede vacante (1275–1278)

- Fidesmundus (1278–1283)
- Bouromaeus (1283–1289)
- Franciscus (1289–1295)
- Berardus, O.S.B. (1295–1305)
- Jacobus (1306–1312)
- Jacobus (1312–1339)

Sede vacante (1339–1342)

- Petrus de Pensauro (1342–1356)
- Lucas Mannelli, O.P. (1358–1362)
- Leo de Arimino, O.Min. (1362–1389)
- Petrus, O.E.S.A. (1389–1394)
- Joannes, O.P. (1394–1407)
- Antonius David (1497–1410) (Roman Obedience)
- Antonius Carbone (1410–1417) (Pisan Obedience)
- Giovanni de Bertoldi, O.Min. (1417–1445)
- Giovanni di Renzo de Tonsis, O.F.M. (1445–1482)
- Domenico Antonio (1482–1499)

==== 1500–1800 ====
- Giovanni Battista Bertuccioli, O.S.B. (11 Sep 1499 – 1518 Died)
- Goro Gheri (10 Nov 1518 – 1530 Resigned)
- Cosimo Gheri (24 Jan 1530 –1537) Bishop-elect
- Cardinal Pietro Bertani, O.P. (1537–1558)
- Ippolito Capilupo (21 Jan 1560 – 1567 Resigned)
- Francesco Rusticucci (31 Jan 1567 – 1587 Died)
- Giulio Ottinelli (28 Sep 1587 – 25 Feb 1603 Died)
- Tommaso Lapis (21 Apr 1603 – 2 Jun 1622 Died)
- Francesco Boncompagni (11 Jul 1622 – 1626)
- Cardinal Giulio Cesare Sacchetti (1626 – 16 Sep 1635 Resigned)
- Ettore Diotallevi (1635–1641)

Sede vacante (1641–1643)

- Alessandro Castracane (22 Jun 1643 – 22 Jun 1649 Died)
- Giovanni Battista Alfieri (1649–1676)
- Angelo Maria Ranuzzi (18 Apr 1678 – 17 May 1688)
- Taddeo Luigi dal Verme (20 Dec 1688 – 1696)
- Giovanni Battista Giberti (1696–1720)
- Alessandro Dolfi (16 Jul 1721 – 14 Aug 1733 Died)
- Giacomo Beni (1733–1764)
- Giovanni Battista Orsi (1764–1774)
- Pellegrino Consalvi (1775–1787)
- Antonio Gabriele Severoli (1787–1808)

==== 1800–present ====
- Francesco Maria Paolucci Mancinelli (1808– Oct 1815 Died)
- Nicola Serarcangeli (14 Apr 1817 – 11 Jun 1833 Died)
- Luigi Carsidoni (29 Jul 1833 – 3 Dec 1856 Died)
- Filippo Vespasiani (15 Dec 1856 – 7 Oct 1877 Died)
- Camillo Santori (28 Dec 1877 – 9 May 1882 Resigned)
- Camillo Ruggeri (1882–1896)
- Vincenzo Franceschini (22 Jun 1896 – 29 Mar 1916 Died)
- Giustino Sanchini (5 Jun 1916 – 23 Feb 1937 Died)
- Vincenzo Del Signore (20 Sep 1937 – 13 Mar 1967 Died)
- Costanzo Micci (1 Jun 1973 – 4 Sep 1985 Died)

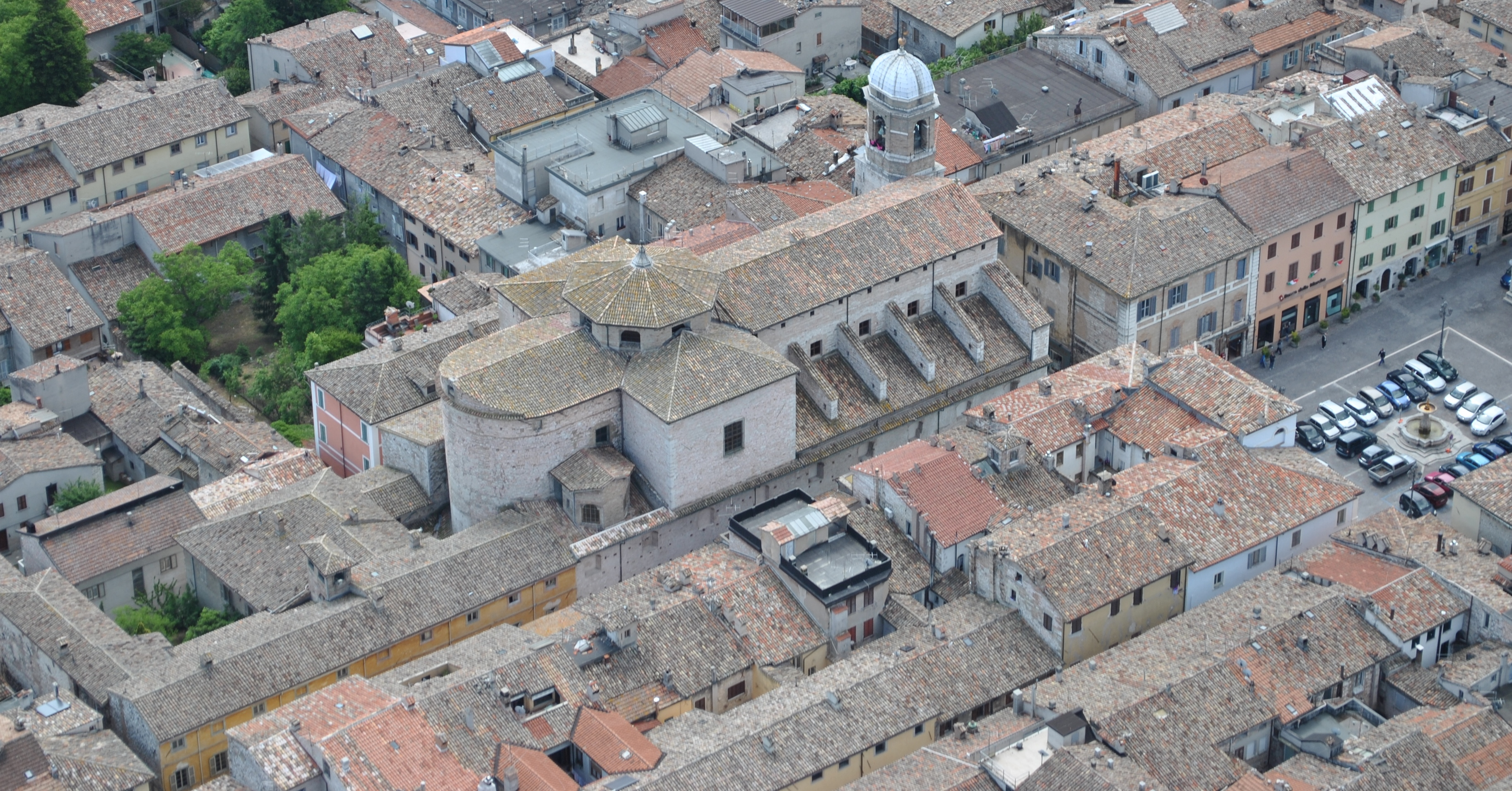
Co-cathedral in Cagli

=== Diocese of Fano-Fossombrone-Cagli-Pergola ===
- Mario Cecchini (11 Feb 1986 – 8 Sep 1998 Resigned)
- Vittorio Tomassetti (8 Sep 1998 Succeeded – 21 Jul 2007 Retired)
- Armando Trasarti (21 Jul 2007 – 3 May 2023 Retired)
- Andrea Andreozzi (3 May 2023 –

== See also ==
- Roman Catholic Diocese of Cagli-Pergola

== Bibliography ==
=== Reference works ===
- Gams, Pius Bonifatius (1873). Series episcoporum Ecclesiae catholicae: quotquot innotuerunt a beato Petro apostolo (in Latin). Ratisbon: Typis et Sumptibus Georgii Josephi Manz. pp. 689–691. (Use with caution; obsolete)
- Eubel, Conradus, ed. (1913). Hierarchia catholica (in Latin). Vol. 1 (second ed.). Münster: Libreria Regensbergiana. p. 245.
- Eubel, Conradus, ed. (1914). Hierarchia catholica (in Latin). Vol. 2 (second ed.). Münster: Libreria Regensbergiana. p. 152..
- Eubel, Conradus; Gulik, Guilelmus (1923). Hierarchia catholica. Vol. 3 (second ed.). Münster: Libreria Regensbergiana. pp. 262–263.
- Gauchat, Patritius (Patrice) (1935). Hierarchia catholica (in Latin). Vol. 4 (1592-1667). Münster: Libraria Regensbergiana. pp. 184–185.
- Ritzler, Remigius; Sefrin, Pirminus (1952). Hierarchia catholica medii et recentis aevi (in Latin). Vol. 5 (1667-1730). Patavii: Messagero di S. Antonio. p. 297.
- Ritzler, Remigius; Sefrin, Pirminus (1958). Hierarchia catholica medii et recentis aevi (in Latin). Vol. 6 (1730-1799). Patavii: Messagero di S. Antonio. p. 213.

=== Studies ===
- Amiani, Pietro Maria (1751). Memorie istoriche della città di Fano (in Italian). Vol. Parte prima. Fano: stamp. di G. Leonardi.
- Amiani, Pietro Maria (1751). Memorie istoriche della città di Fano (in Italian). Vol. Parte seconda. Fano: Stamp. di G. Leonardi.
- Cappelletti, Giuseppe (1848). Le chiese d'Italia: dalla loro origine sino ai nostri giorni (in Italian). Vol. settimo (7). Venezia: G. Antonelli. pp. 321–433.
- Ceccarelli, Giuseppe (2005). I Vescovi delle Diocesi di Fano, Fossombrone, Cagli e Pergola - Cronotassi. Fano: Fondazione Cassa di Risparmio di Fano.
- Kehr, Paul Fridolin (1909). Italia pontificia Vol. IV (Berlin: Weidmann 1909), pp. 184–191. (in Latin)
- Lanzoni, Francesco (1927). Le diocesi d'Italia dalle origini al principio del secolo VII (an. 604). Faenza: F. Lega, pp. 485, 497-499. (in Italian)
- Masetti, Pius-Thomas (1875). D. Gregorii papae cognomento Magni Epistolae duae ad Leonem et Fortunatum Fanenses episcopos (in Latin). Rome: F. Chiapperini. pp. 1–7.
- Schwartz, Gerhard (1907). Die Besetzung der Bistümer Reichsitaliens unter den sächsischen und salischen Kaisern: mit den Listen der Bischöfe, 951-1122. Leipzig: B.G. Teubner. pp. 242–243. (in German)
- Ughelli, Ferdinando; Coleti, Niccolo (1717). Italia sacra sive de Episcopis Italiae, et insularum adjacentium, rebusque ab iis praeclare gestis ... opus singulare, provinciis XX distinctum ... auctore D.F. Ughello (in Latin). Vol. Tomus primus. Venice: Apud Sebastianum Coleti. pp. 656–672.
- Zonghi, Aurelio, ed. (1888). Repertorio dell' antico archivio communale di Fano (in Italian). Fano: Sonciniana.
