= Diocese of Tricarico =

Roman Catholic diocese in Italy

Coordinates: 40.6167°N 16.1500°E

Diocese of Tricarico Dioecesis Tricaricensis

Catholic
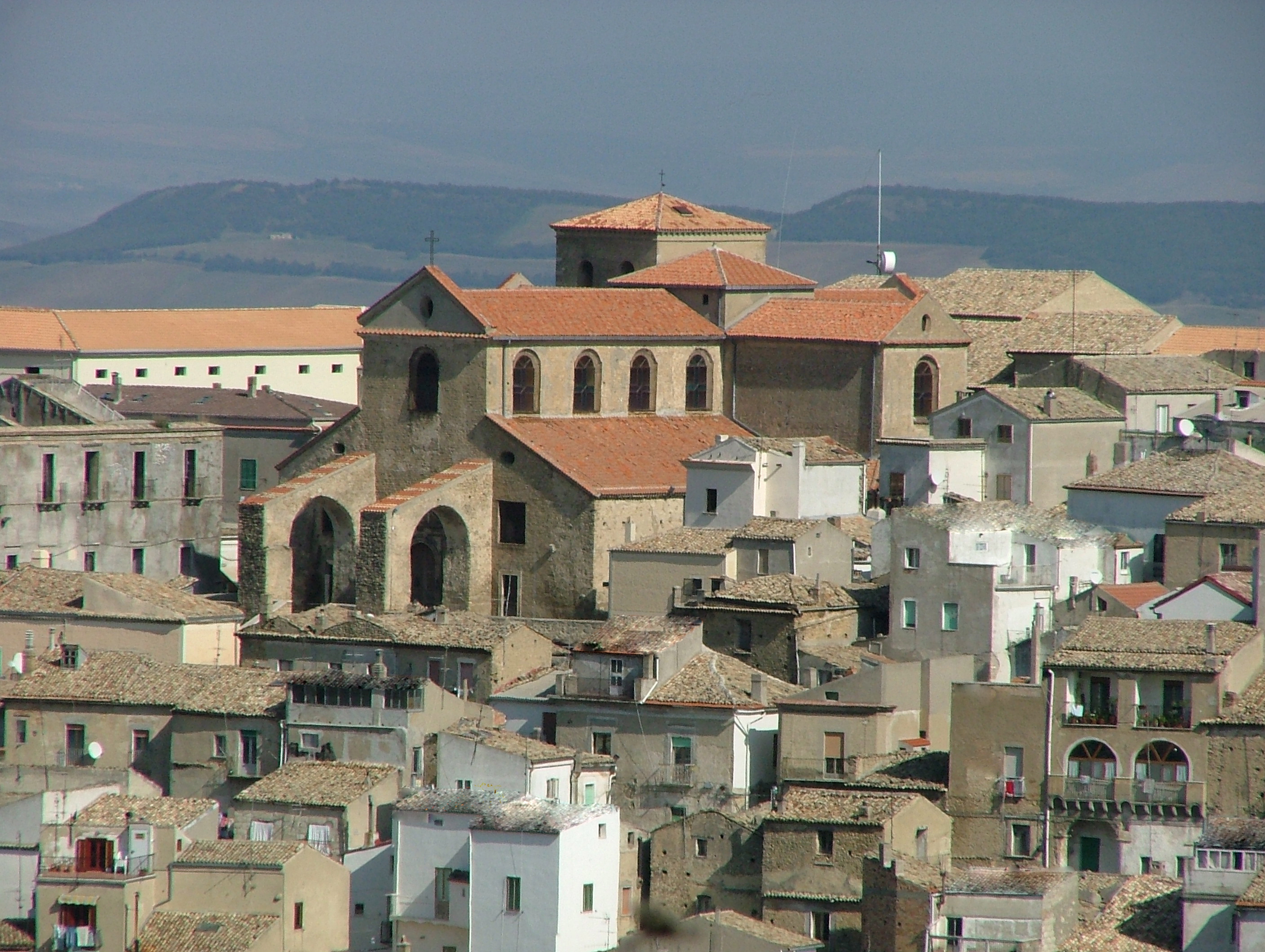
- Tricarico Cathedral

Location
- Country: Italy
- Ecclesiastical province: Potenza-Muro Lucano-Marsico Nuovo

Statistics
- Area: 1,237 km^{2} (478 sq mi)
- Population: Total; Catholics: (as of 2023); 28,056 ▼; 27,200 ▼
- Parishes: 32

Information
- Denomination: Catholic Church
- Rite: Roman Rite
- Established: 11th century
- Cathedral: Cattedrale di S. Maria Assunta
- Secular priests: 36 (diocesan) ▲0 (religious order)

Current leadership
- Pope: Leo XIV
- Bishop: Benoni Ambăruș

Map
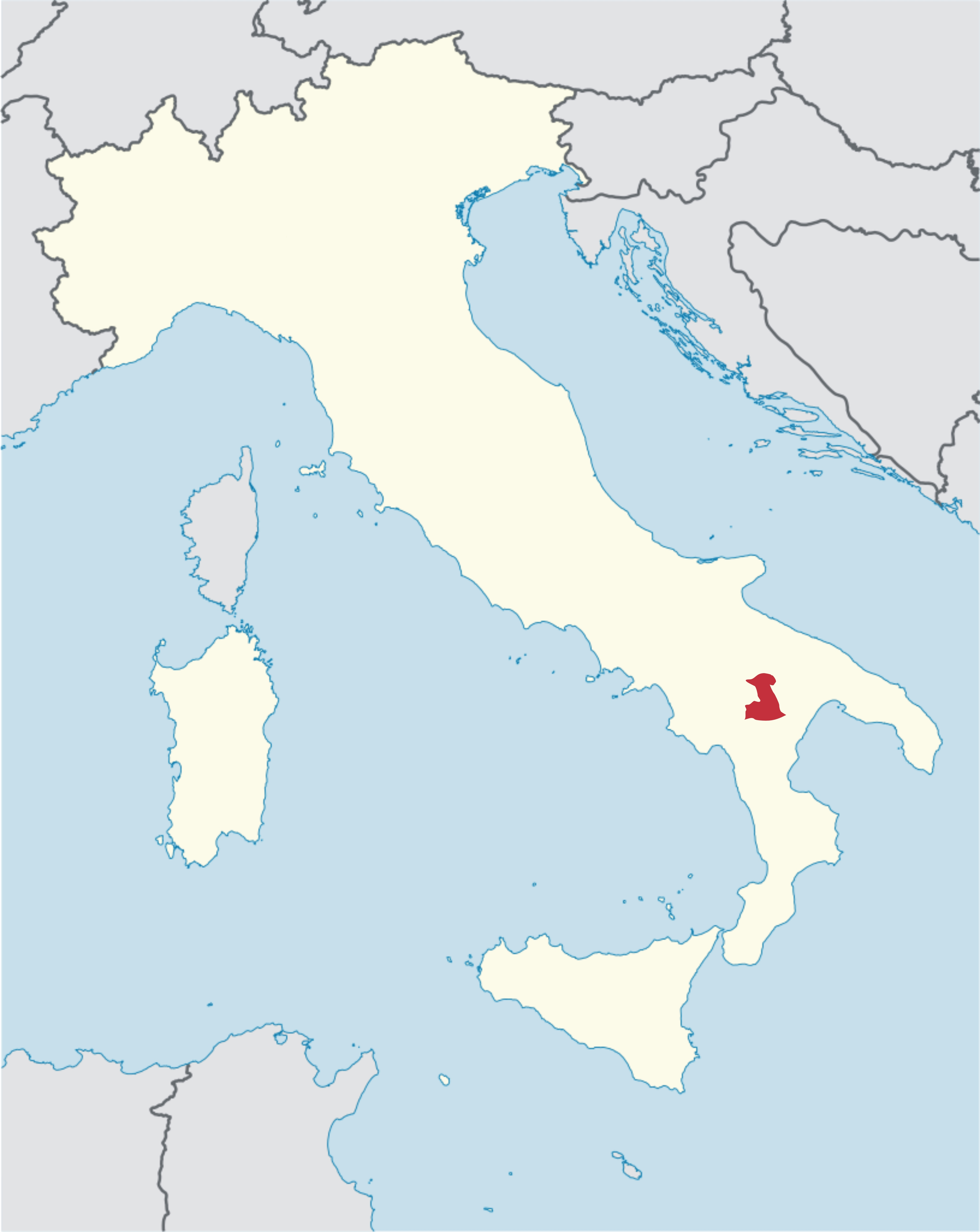

Website
- Diocesi di Tricarico (in Italian)

The Diocese of Tricarico (Latin: Dioecesis Tricaricensis) is a Latin diocese of the Catholic Church in Basilicata. It is a suffragan of the Archdiocese of Potenza-Muro Lucano-Marsico Nuovo.

== History ==
Bishop Liutprand of Cremona, who had participated in the siege of the Byzantines at Bari in 968, was sent by his patron the Emperor Otto I to Constantinople to seek a negotiated peace with the Emperor Nikephoros II Phokas. His mission was unsuccessful, and on his return Liutprand wrote a highly colored narration of his embassy, the "Relatio de legatione Constantinopolitana ad Nicephorum Phocam". The document mentions an aggressive act on the part of Polyeuctos, Patriarch of Constantinople, raising the bishopric of Otranto (Hydruntum) to the rank of a metropolitanate, and granting that prelate the right to consecrate bishops for Acerenza, Turcico (Tursi), Gravina, Macera, and Tricarico. Liutprand remarks that he thought that those consecrations were the right of the pope. This is the earliest mention of a bishop of Tricarico.

Nicephoros Phocas according to Liutprand, ordered that all the dioceses in Byzantine territory in south Italy should use only the Greek Rite in the liturgy. The names of the Greek-rite bishops of Tricarico whose allegiance was to Constantinople are not known.

In 1068, the diocese of Tricarico was assigned by Pope Alexander II to the metropolitanate of Acerenza.

Of the Latin bishops after the Norman conquest the first was Arnoldo (1068).

On 7 October 1123, Pope Calixtus II, who was residing in Benevento at the time, at the request of Bishop Peter of Tricarico, took the diocese under papal protection, and, in the bull Aequitatis et justitiae, confirmed the bishops' privileges and possessions, which are extensively listed.

On 3 June 1237, at the request of Bishop Rogerius of Tricarico, Pope Gregory IX took the diocese under the protection of the papacy, and confirmed the bishops of the diocese in their privileges and possessions. The bull, In eminenti, lists all of the towns, villages and churches belonging to the diocese.

=== Papal reservation of right to elect ===
On 29 July 1322, Pope John XXII reserved to the pope the right to nominate as well as confirm the appointment of all bishops in Italy, including the bishops of Tricarico. This act removed the power of electing a bishop from the cathedral Chapter. When Bishop Richardus died early in 1324, the Canons of the cathedral Chapter proceeded, in accordance with custom, to elect a new bishop, Rogerius de Sanseverino, even though he was under the minimum age. Pope John XXII immediately invalidated his election, as attempted contrary to papal reservation, and on 4 May 1324 appointed Bonaccursus, the archpriest of the church of Ferrara instead.

Bishop Fortunado Pinto (1792–1805) held a diocesan synod in Tricarico on 5 June 1800.

=== The Napoleonic disruption and restoration ===
From 1805 to 1819 the see of Tricarico remained vacant. From 1806–1808, Naples was occupied by the French, and Joseph Bonaparte was made king, after Napoleon had deposed King Ferdinand IV. Joseph Bonaparte was succeeded by Joachim Murat from 1808 until the fall of Napoleon in 1815. Pope Pius VII was a prisoner of Napoleon in France from 1809 to 1815, and was both unable and unwilling to make new episcopal appointments. The French expelled all monks, nuns, and Jesuits from the kingdom, and closed the monasteries and convents; colleges of canons were also closed.

Following the extinction of the Napoleonic Kingdom of Italy, the Congress of Vienna authorized the restoration of the Papal States and the Kingdom of Naples. Since the French occupation had seen the abolition of many Church institutions in the Kingdom, as well as the confiscation of most Church property and resources, it was imperative that Pope Pius VII and King Ferdinand IV reach agreement on restoration and restitution. Ferdinand, however, was not prepared to accept the pre-Napoleonic situation, in which Naples was a feudal subject of the papacy. Neither was he prepared to accept the large number of small dioceses in his kingdom; following French intentions, he demanded the suppression of fifty dioceses. Lengthy, detailed, and acrimonious negotiations ensued. On 17 July 1816, King Ferdinand issued a decree, in which he forbade the reception of any papal document without prior reception of the royal exequatur. This meant that prelates could not receive bulls of appointment, consecration, or installation without the king's permission.

A concordat was finally signed on 16 February 1818, and ratified by Pius VII on 25 February 1818. Ferdinand issued the concordat as a law on 21 March 1818. The re-erection of the dioceses of the kingdom and the ecclesiastical provinces took more than three years. The right of the king to nominate the candidate for a vacant bishopric was recognized, as in the Concordat of 1741, subject to papal confirmation (preconisation). On 27 June 1818, Pius VII issued the bull De Ulteriore, in which the metropolitanate of Acerenza was restored, with Anglona e Tursi, Potenza, Tricarico, and Venosa as suffragans; the diocese of Matera was permanently suppressed and united to the Church of Acerenza.

The diocese of Tricarico was a suffragan of the newly constituted archdiocese of Acerenza and Matera from 1821 until 1954. On 2 July 1954, Pope Pius XII issued the bull Acheronta et Matera, in which he revived the diocese of Matera as a metropolitan archbishopric with its own ecclesiastical province including the dioceses of Anglona-Turso and Tricarico as its suffragans. Following the Second Vatican Council, and in accordance with the norms laid out in the council's decree, Christus Dominus chapter 40, Pope Paul VI ordered a reorganization of the ecclesiastical provinces in southern Italy by the bull Quo aptius of 21 August 1976. The ecclesiastical provinces of Acerenza and of Matera were abolished, and a new province, that of Potenza, was created. The diocese of Tricarico became a suffragan of the metropolitanate of Potenza.

=== Chapter and cathedral ===
The current cathedral of Tricarico dates back to the 16–18th century; it was built on the pre-existing foundations of an earlier church, already dedicated to the Assumption of the Blessed Virgin Mary, built in the 12th century. In order to keep the old medieval cathedral in repair, Cardinal Tommaso Brancaccio obtained from Pope Martin V an indulgence for persons visiting the cathedral and contributing to the fund for the maintenance of the fabric. The cathedral was administered by a corporation called the Chapter composed of one, and then two dignities (the Archdeacon and the Cantor), and twelve canons. One of the canons was designated by the bishop as the pastor of the cathedral parish. There were also 30 hebdomidary priests appointed to say the daily Mass. In 1741, there were three dignities and eighteen canons. When Bishop Angelo succeeded to the diocese in 1411, he found the finances of the Chapter in such dire straits that he permanently diverted part of his own income from one of the gabelles to aid the prelates to live in some dignity.

== Bishops of Tricarico ==
=== to 1350 ===
...
[*Arnaldus (c. 1069)]
...

- Librandus (attested 1098)

...

- Petrus (attested 1123)
- Herbertus (attested 1127)

...

- Robertus (attested 1176–1194)
- Joannes (attested 1210–1215)
- Rogerius (attested 1237)

...

- [Rogerius (1253–1254) Bishop-elect]
- Palmerius de Gallucio (1253–1283)
- Leonardus, O.Min. (attested 1284)
- Richardus
- Bonaccursus (1324–1325/1326)
- Goffredus (1326– ? )
- Matthaeus
- Rogerius

=== 1350 to 1500 ===
- Angelus (1350–1365)
- Petrus de Serlupis (1365–1373)
- Andreas Calderini (1373–1378)
- Martinus (1378–1380)
- Joannes de Gallinario (1382–c. 1385) Avignon Obedience
- Vitus (1385– ? ) Avignon Obedience
- Thomas (attested 1385) Roman Obedience
- Tommaso Brancaccio (1405–1411)
- Angelo (1411–1419)
- Tommaso Brancaccio (1419–1427) Perpetual Administrator
- Stephanus de Carraria (1427–1432)
- Angelo (1433–1438 Died)
- Nicolò da Venezia, O.P. (1438–1446)
- Sabbas Carboni (1446-1447)
- Laurentius, O.Min. (1447–1448)
- Onofrio de Santa Croce (1448–1471 Died)
- Orso Orsini (1471–1474)
- Scipione Cicinelli (1474–1494)
- Augustinus Guarino (1497-1510)

=== 1500 to 1700 ===
- Oliviero Carafa (1510–1511) Administrator
- Ludovico Canossa, O. Cist. (1511–1529 Resigned)
- Alessandro Spagnuolo (1529–1535 Died)
- Gerolamo Falinghieri (1535–1539 Died)
- Francesco Orsini (1539–1554 Resigned)
- Nunzio Antonio de Capriolis (1554–1585)
- Giovanni Battista Santorio (1586–1592)
- Ottavio Mirto Frangipani (1592–1605 Appointed, Archbishop of Taranto)
- Diomede Carafa (1605–1609 Died)
- Sebastiano Roberti (Settimio Vittori) (1609–1611 Resigned)
- Roberto Roberti (bishop) (Roberto Vittori), O.P. (1611–1624 Died)
- Pier Luigi Carafa (seniore) (1624–1646 Resigned)
- Pier Luigi Carafa (bishop), C.R. (1646–1672 Died)
- Andrea Francolisio (d'Aquino) (1673–1676 Resigned)
- Gaspare Toralto (1676–1681 Died)
- Gaspare Mezzomonaco, O.S.B. (1682–1683 Died)
- Fulvio Crivelli (Cribelli) (1684–1685 Died)
- Francesco Antonio Leopardi (1685–1717 Died)

=== 1700 to 1900 ===
- Luca Trapani (1718–1719)
- Simeone Veglini (1720–1720 Died)
- Nicolò Antonio Carafa, O.S.B. (1720–1741 Resigned)
- Antonio Zavarroni (1741–1759 Died)
- Antonio Francesco de Plato (1760–1783 Died)
- Fortunado Pinto (1792–1805)

Sede vacante (1805–1819)

- Pietro-Paolo Presicce, O.E.S.A. (1819–1838 Died)
- Camillo Letizia, C.M. (1838 –1859 Died)
- Simone Spilotros, O. Carm. (1859–1877 Died)
- Camillo Siciliano di Rende (1877–1879)
- Angelo Michele Onorati (1879–12 Feb 1903 Died)

=== since 1900 ===
- Anselmo Filippo Pecci, O.S.B. (1903–1907)
- Giovanni Fiorentini (1909–1919)
- Achille Grimaldi (1921–1921 Resigned)
- Raffaele delle Nocche (1922–1960 Died)
- Bruno M. Pelaia (1961–1974 Died)
- Giuseppe Vairo (1976–1977 Appointed, Archbishop of Acerenza)
- Carmelo Cassati, M.S.C. (1979–1985 Appointed, Bishop of San Severo)
- Francesco Zerrillo (1985–1997 Appointed, Bishop of Lucera-Troia)
- Salvatore Ligorio (1997–2004 Appointed, Archbishop of Matera-Irsina)
- Vincenzo Carmine Orofino (2004–2016 Appointed, Bishop of Tursi-Lagonegro)
- Giovanni Intini (7 December 2016 – 9 December 2023 Appointed Archbishop of Archdiocese of Brindisi-Ostuni)
- Antonio Giuseppe Caiazzo (2023–2025)
- Benoni Ambăruș (since 18 June 2025)

== Bibliography ==
=== Reference works ===
- Gams, Pius Bonifatius (1873). Series episcoporum Ecclesiae catholicae: quotquot innotuerunt a beato Petro apostolo. Ratisbon: Typis et Sumptibus Georgii Josephi Manz. p. 935-936; Supplement p. 22. (Use with caution; obsolete)
- Eubel, Conradus, ed. (1913). Hierarchia catholica (in Latin). Vol. Tomus 1 (second ed.). Münster: Libreria Regensbergiana.
- Eubel, Conradus, ed. (1914). Hierarchia catholica (in Latin). Vol. Tomus 2 (second ed.). Münster: Libreria Regensbergiana.
- Eubel, Conradus; Gulik, Guilelmus (1923). Hierarchia catholica (in Latin). Vol. Tomus 3 (second ed.). Münster: Libreria Regensbergiana.
- Gauchat, Patritius (Patrice) (1935). Hierarchia catholica IV (1592-1667). Münster: Libraria Regensbergiana.
- Ritzler, Remigius; Sefrin, Pirminus (1952). Hierarchia catholica medii et recentis aevi (in Latin). Vol. Tomus V (1667-1730). Patavii: Messagero di S. Antonio.
- Ritzler, Remigius; Sefrin, Pirminus (1958). Hierarchia catholica medii et recentis aevi (in Latin). Vol. Tomus VI (1730-1799). Patavii: Messagero di S. Antonio.
- Ritzler, Remigius; Sefrin, Pirminus (1968). Hierarchia Catholica medii et recentioris aevi sive summorum pontificum, S. R. E. cardinalium, ecclesiarum antistitum series... A pontificatu Pii PP. VII (1800) usque ad pontificatum Gregorii PP. XVI (1846) (in Latin). Vol. Tomus VII. Monasterii: Libr. Regensburgiana.
- Ritzler, Remigius; Pirminus Sefrin (1978). Hierarchia catholica Medii et recentioris aevi... A Pontificatu PII PP. IX (1846) usque ad Pontificatum Leonis PP. XIII (1903) (in Latin). Vol. VIII. Il Messaggero di S. Antonio.
- Pięta, Zenon (2002). Hierarchia catholica medii et recentioris aevi... A pontificatu Pii PP. X (1903) usque ad pontificatum Benedictii PP. XV (1922) (in Latin). Vol. Tomus IX. Padua: Messagero di San Antonio. ISBN 978-88-250-1000-8.

=== Studies ===
- Biscaglia, Carmela (2015). "Vescovi e visite pastorali della diocesi di Tricarico," (in Italian), in: Bollettino storico della Basilicata 31 (2015), pp. 13–74.
- Cappelletti, Giuseppe (1870). Le chiese d'Italia: dalla loro origine sino ai nostri giorni (in Italian). Vol. vigesimo (20). Venezia: G. Antonelli. pp. 481–492.
- Daraio, G. (1909). Il vescovato di Tricarico, (in Italian) Manduria: Lacaita, 1909.
- D'Avino, Vincenzio (1848). Cenni storici sulle chiese arcivescovili, vescovili, e prelatizie (nullius) del regno delle due Sicilie (in Italian). Naples: dalle stampe di Ranucci. pp. 680–692.
- Kamp, Norbert (1975). Kirche und Monarchie im staufischen Königreich Sizilien: I. Prosopographische Grundlegung, Bistumer und Bistümer und Bischöfe des Konigreichs 1194–1266: 2. Apulien und Calabrien (in German) München: Wilhelm Fink 1975.
- Russo, Giuseppe (2016), "Vicende della diocesi e dei vescovi di Tricarico dalle origini alla prima metà del XV secolo, con un’appendice di documenti regi, pontifici, cardinalizi e vescovili inediti (1411-1444),| (in Italian), in: Archivio Storico per la Calabria e la Lucania LXXXII, 2016, pp. 5–75, ISSN 0004-0355
- Torelli, Felice (1848). La chiave del Concordato dell'anno 1818 e degli atti emanati posteriormente al medesimo. (in Italian) Volume 1, second edition Naples: Stamperia del Fibreno, 1848.
- Ughelli, Ferdinando; Coleti, NIccolo (1721). Italia sacra sive De episcopis Italiæ, et insularum adjacentium (in Latin). Vol. Tomus septimus (7). Venice: apud Sebastianum Coleti. pp. 183–256.
