= Diocese of Aleria =

Roman Catholic titular see

The Diocese of Aleria (Latin Dioecesis Aleriensis) is, since 2002, a titular see of the Catholic Church. It was formerly a diocese of the Latin Church in the center of the eastern coast of the island of Corsica in the Department of Haute-Corse. The town of Aleria was subject to repeated raids by Arab fleets in the eighth and ninth centuries, and, eventually, abandoned. The bishop moved to a secure stronghold to the north. From at least the eleventh century, the diocese was a suffragan of the metropolitan archdiocese of Pisa. The diocese was suppressed by the Civil Constitution of the Clergy in 1790, and was not revived by the Concordat of 1801 between the French Consulate and the Papacy.

== History ==
There is evidence that Corsica was being converted to Christianity in the late 6th century. Pope Gregory I wrote in 597 to Bishop Peter of Aleria to recover lapsed converts and to convert more pagans from the worship of trees and sacred stones (menhir). He sent him money for baptismal robes. In 601, however, Aleria was without a bishop. Gregory had sent a certain Bishop Leo as Apostolic Visitor to deal with the situation in Corsica, where there had been no bishop for some time. Pope Gregory addresses Leo as episcopus in Corsica, bishop in Corsica, not bishop of Corsica, and authorizes him to perform ordinations of priests and deacons. While Leo was still in Corsica, Pope Gregory sent a second bishop, Martinus to join in the Visitation.

With the Arab invasions, the town of Aleria was destroyed and abandoned. The bishop and cathedral retreated to the hillside town of Cervione, above the beach of Campoloro, some 25 km north of Aleria. In 846, Adelbert the tutor Corsicanae insulae informed Pope Sergius II that a force of 11,000 Saracens, with 73 ships and 500 cavalry, had come. Pope Leo IV (849–855) allowed the people of Corsica, who were fleeing from the Saracens, to settle in the town of Porto

By the time of Pope Alexander II (1061–1073) there were several bishops functioning in Corsica again. In 1077, Pope Gregory VII (1073–1085) entrusted the dioceses of the island to the Bishop of Pisa as his Vicar. The Pope expresses happiness that the people of Corsica, after having for such a long time been subjected to the justice of the invaders, wish to return to the justice of the Holy Roman Church.

In 1713 there were some 200 people living in Aleria, under the government of the Genoese, though ecclesiastically they belonged to the Metropolitan of Pisa. There were 18 towns and villages in the diocese. In 1770, at the beginning of the French domination of Corsica, the bishop no longer lived in Aléria, but in Cervione. The Cathedral Chapter had one dignity and twelve Canons. The diocese had 160 parishes.

On 29 November 1801, in accordance with the Napoleontic Concordat of 1801, it was suppressed as the territory of the diocese of Ajaccio was extended to the whole of Corsica.

Today, Aleria is no longer a residential bishopric, but the name was revived as a titular see in April 2002.

== Bishops of Aleria ==
=== to 1300 ===
- Peter (596, 597)
- Bonosus (attested 649)
- Landulphus (Landolf) (1093 – after 1119)
- [Ignotus] (708) (consecrated by Pope Sisinnius)
- Hieronymus (1122 – ?)
- Marco de Volaterres (1139 – ?)
- Blaise (1172 – ?)
- Flavius (1179 – ?)
- Anthony (1190 – ?)
- Clement (1217 – ?)
- Nicholas (1228 – ?)
- Lombardo Cuneo (1239 – ?)
- Orlandu Cortincu della Petrallarretta (1249 – ?)
- Landolf (1257 – ?)
- Lombard (1258 – ?)
- Nicolao Fortiguerra, O.P. (1270 – ? )
- Bartolomeo de Benevento, O.P. (1274 – ? )
- Orlandu Cortincu (1289 – ? )

=== 1300 to 1500 ===
- Salvin (1300 – ?)
- Guglielmo (1309 – ?)
- Gerardo Orlandini (1322 – 1330)
- Galgano Bocca di Bue, O.Min. (1330 – 1342)
- Guglielmo Arcumbaldi (1342 – 1345)
- Arnald, Dominican Order (O.P.) (1345.07.30 – ?), previously Bishop of Segni (Italy) (1333.10.30 – 1345.07.30)
- Raimond (1354 – ?)
- Johannes (1360 – 1362)
- Biagio (Blaise), O.P. (1362 – ?)
- Salvino da Nebbio (1366 – 1405)
- Bartholomaeus (1406 – 1410)
- Ottobonus Lomellino (18 Feb 1411 – ?)
- Ioannes Leonis, O.P. (1440)
- Ambrughju d’Omessa (1440 – 1464)
- Giovanni Andrea Bussi (1469 – death 1475)
- Cardinal Ardicino della Porta, iuniore (22 Feb 1465 – death 4 Feb 1493)
- Girolamo Pallavicini (1493 – 1512> )

=== since 1500 ===
- Cardinal Innocenzo Cibo (1518.06.19 – 1520.12.19) Apostolic Administrator
- Francesco Pallavicini (1520 – 1550)
- Pietro Francesco Pallavicini (1551 – death 1570)
- Alessandro Sauli, (B.) (1570.02.10 – 1591.05.10)
- Ottavio Belmosto (1591.07.31 – 1608)
- Domenico Rivarola (1608.12.10 – 1609.03.30)
- Giovanni Sauli (Scali, Sacchi) (1609 – 1611)
- Giovan Francesco Murta (de Mirto) (1611 – 1612)
- Dezio Giustiniani (1612 – 1642)
- Cardinal Ottaviano Raggi (1643)
- Agostino Donghi (1643 – 1645)
- Cardinal Ottaviano Raggi, Apostolic Administrator. (1643.01.12 – 1643.12.31)
- Giovanni Battista Imperiali (1645 – 1674)
- Mario Emmanuelle Durazzo (1674 – 1704)
- Raffaele Raggi, B. (3 March 1705 – 20 Sep 1712)
- Carlo Maria Giuseppe de Fornari (30 Jan 1713 – 20 Feb 1715)
- Agostino Saluzzo, Lazarists (C.M.) (1715 – 1720)
- Camillo de Mari (1720 – death 1741)
- Girolamo Curlo (1741 – 1749)
- Matteu d’Angelis (1750 – death 1769)
- Jean-Joseph-Marie de Guernes (1770.08.06 – 29 November 1801)

== Titular bishops of Aleria ==
- Guido Fiandino (2002.06.21 – ...), retired, Auxiliary Bishop Emeritus of Turin

== Books ==
- Cappelletti, Giuseppe (1861). Le chiese d'Italia Tomo decimosesto Venezia: Giuseppe Antonelli. pp. 326–353. Retrieved: 2016-10-26.
- Eubel, Conradus, ed. (1913). Hierarchia catholica, Tomus 1 (second ed.). Münster: Libreria Regensbergiana. (in Latin)
- Eubel, Conradus, ed. (1914). Hierarchia catholica, Tomus 2 (second ed.). Münster: Libreria Regensbergiana.
- Gulik, Guilelmus (1923). Eubel, Conradus (ed.). Hierarchia catholica, Tomus 3 (second ed.). Münster: Libreria Regensbergiana.
- Gams, Pius Bonifatius (1873). Series episcoporum Ecclesiae catholicae: quotquot innotuerunt a beato Petro apostolo (in Latin). Ratisbon: Typis et Sumptibus Georgii Josephi Manz.
- Gauchat, Patritius (Patrice) (1935). Hierarchia catholica IV (1592-1667). Münster: Libraria Regensbergiana.
- Kehr, Paulus Fridolin (1975). ed. D. Girgensohn. Italia Pontificia. Vol. X: Calabria—Insulae (Turici: Weidmann).
- Pisani, Paul (1907). Répertoire biographique de l'épiscopat constitutionnel (1791-1802) (in French). Paris: A. Picard et fils.
- Ritzler, Remigius; Sefrin, Pirminus (1952). Hierarchia catholica medii et recentis aevi V (1667-1730). Patavii: Messagero di S. Antonio.
- Ritzler, Remigius; Sefrin, Pirminus (1958). Hierarchia catholica medii et recentis aevi VI (1730-1799). Patavii: Messagero di S. Antonio.
- Ughelli, Ferdinando; Coleti, Niccolo (1718). Italia sacra sive De episcopis Italiæ, et insularum adjacentium (in Latin). Vol. Tomus tertius (3) (secunda ed.). Venice: apud Sebastianum Coleti. pp. 501–515.

== See also ==
- Catholic Church in Italy
