= Diocese of Fossombrone =

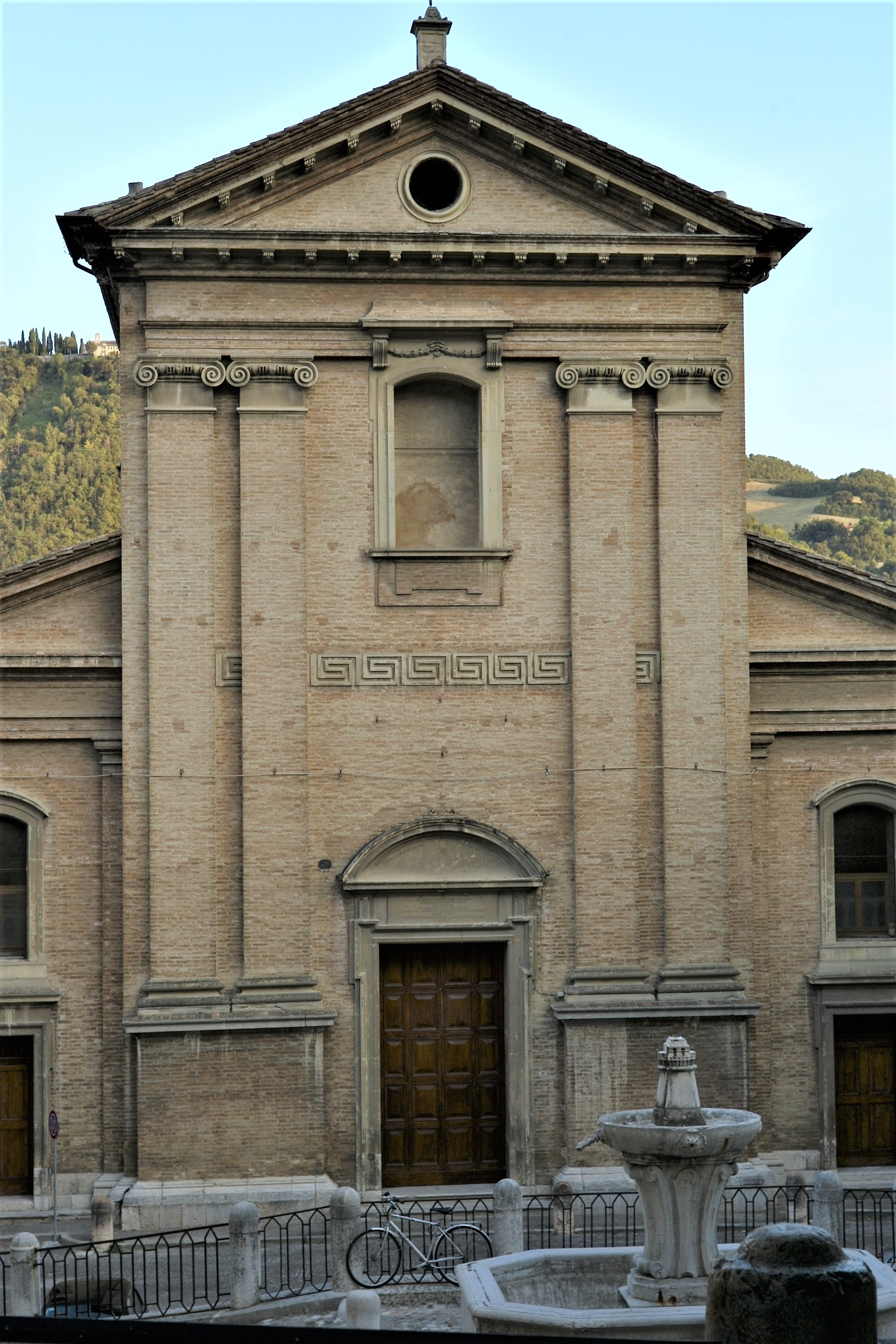
Co-cathedral, Fossombrone

The Catholic diocese of Fossombrone (Latin Name: Forosemproniensis) existed in the Italian province of Pesaro and Urbino, in the comune of Fossombrone, in the valley of the Metaurus River, 25 km (15 mi) southwest of the Adriatic seaport of Fano. In 1986, the diocese was suppressed and its territory incorporated into the diocese of Fano-Fossombrone-Cagli-Pergola. Up to 1563, the diocese had been directly subject to the papacy. It then became a suffragan of the archdiocese of Urbino. In 2000, Urbino lost its metropolitan status, and Fossombrone became part of the ecclesiastical province of Pesaro.

== History ==
Map of diocese of Fano-Fossombrone-Cagli-Pergola

Christianity was introduced there, according to Ferdinando Ughelli, by Felicianus of Foligno, though not until after the baptism of Constantine the Great (337). The martyrologies mention several martyrs: Aquilinus, Geminus, Gelasius, Magnus and Donata, also a bishop, Timothy, and his daughter (4 February), but these persons belong elsewhere, and were not honored in Fossombrone until the late 16th century. The first bishop of certain date is Innocent, who was present at the synods of Pope Symmachus (504).

In 558, there was trouble with the papacy, due to the intrusion of a person called Paulinus. Pope Pelagius I wrote to the Magister Militum Joannes to have the pseudoepiscopus Paulinus taken into custody. In another letter to the Illustri Viator and Pancratius, he ordered that Paulinus be taken to a monastery, to which he had been relegated, as soon as possible. In a third letter, he ordered Basilius and Ocleantinus, who were defenders of Paulinus, to cease and desist from his cause. In a fourth letter, the pope requested Magister Joannes to bring Paulinus to him.

Fossombrone was included in the Donation of Pepin, but remained subject to the Duchy of Spoleto until 1198, when it passed under papal rule. Pope Alexander II, in the bull "Cum in Dei" of 15 May 1054, defined the boundaries of the diocese. Pope Victor II (1055–1057) noticed the impoverished state of the diocese of Fossombrone, and gave the bishops the church of S. Giovanni in Sorbitulo with its income. Some of the property belonging to the church of Sorbitulo, the castle of Laureto, was subject to an attempt in 1182 by the Prior of Fons Avellana to acquire it; Pope Lucius III appointed three cardinals to investigate the claims, and then took the church under his protection.

The diocese was then held in fief of the Holy See by different families: by the house of Este (1210–28), the Malatesta (1340-1445), the Montefeltro of Urbino, 1445-1631); from 1500 to 1503 it acknowledged the rule of Cesare Borgia.

On 4 June 1563, Pope Pius IV signed the bull "Super Universas", by which he elevated the diocese of Urbino to the status of metropolitan archdiocese. He assigned as suffragan dioceses of the new ecclesiastical province Cagli, Sinigaglia, Pesaro, Fossombrone, Montefeltro, and Gubbio. Fossombrone was no longer directly dependent upon the papacy.

The cathedral of Fossombrone is dedicated to the martyr Saint Maurentius and to Bishop Aldobrandus. The cathedral had a Provost, a Theologus, a Penitentiarius and eleven canons.

Bishop Lorenzo Landi (1612–1627) presided over a diocesan synod on 28 July 1619. Bishop Benedetto Landi (1628–1632) held a diocesan synod in 1629.

=== Diocesan Reorganizations ===
Following the Second Vatican Council, and in accordance with the norms laid out in the council's decree, Christus Dominus chapter 40, Pope Paul VI ordered a reorganization of the ecclesiastical provinces in Italy. He ordered consultations among the members of the Congregation of Bishops in the Vatican Curia, the Italian Bishops Conference, and the various dioceses concerned.

On 18 February 1984, the Vatican and the Italian State signed a new and revised concordat. Based on the revisions, a set of Normae was issued on 15 November 1984, which was accompanied in the next year, on 3 June 1985, by enabling legislation. According to the agreement, the practice of having one bishop govern two separate dioceses at the same time, aeque personaliter, was abolished. The Vatican continued consultations which had begun under Pope John XXIII for the merging of small dioceses, especially those with personnel and financial problems, into one combined diocese.

On 30 September 1986, Pope John Paul II ordered that the dioceses of Fano, Fossombrone, Cagli, and Pergola be merged into one diocese with one bishop, with the Latin title Dioecesis Fanensis-Forosemproniensis-Calliensis-Pergulana. The seat of the diocese was to be in Fano, whose cathedral was to serve as the cathedral of the merged diocese. The cathedrals in Fossombrone, Cagli and Pergola were to have the honorary titles of "co-cathedral"; the Chapters were each to be a Capitulum Concathedralis. There was to be only one diocesan Tribunal, in Fano, and likewise one seminary, one College of Consultors, and one Priests' Council. The territory of the new diocese was to include the territory of the suppressed dioceses. The new diocese was a suffragan of the archdiocese of Urbino.

In 2000, Urbino lost its metropolitan status, and became, along with its former suffragans, part of the ecclesiastical province of Pesaro.

== Bishops of Fossombrone ==
Erected: 5th Century
Metropolitan (1563–2000): Archdiocese of Urbino–Urbania–Sant’Angelo in Vado; from 2000: Roman Catholic Archdiocese of Pesaro

=== to 1370 ===
- Innocent (attested 504)

...

- Petrus (attested 876–877)

...

- Reginhardus (attested 967)

...

- Adam (attested 1036–1044)
- Benedictus (attested 1049–1070)
- Fulcuinus (Fulcinus) (attested 1076),

...

- Aldebrandus (1119)

...

- Gualfredus (attested 1140)

...

- Nicolaus (1179–1197)
- [Anonymous] (1201– ? )
- Ubertinellus (1217)
- Monaldus (attested 1219–1228)
- Ricardus (attested in 1243)
- Gentilis
- Jacobus de Cluzano (1286– ? )
- Monaldus (1296–1303)
- Joannes (1304–1317)
- Petrus (Gabrielli) (1317–1327)
- Philippus (1327–1334?)
- Arnaldus (1334–1342)
- Hugolinus (1342–1363)
- Galvanus (1363–1372)

=== 1370 to 1800 ===
- Oddo (1372–1408)
- Ruellus de Ruelli (1408– ? )
- Joannes (de Verrucolo) (1420–1432 ?)
- Delfino Gozzadini, O.Cist. (1433–1434)
- Andrea de Montecchio (1434)
- Gabriele Benveduto (1434–1449)
- Agostino Lanfranchi (1449–1469)
- Gerolamo Santucci (1469–1494)
- Paul of Middelburg (1494–1534)
- Giovanni Guidiccioni (1534–1541)
- Niccolò Ardinghelli (1541–1547 Resigned) Cardinal
- Lodovico Ardinghelli (Luigi Ardinghelli)(1547–1569)
- Alessandro Mazza (1569–1575 Resigned)
- Orazio Montegranelli (1577–1579 Died)
- Ottavio Accoramboni (1579–1610 Resigned)
- Giovanni Canauli (Cannuli) (1610–1612 Resigned)
- Lorenzo Landi (1612–1627)
- Benedetto Landi (1628–1632 Resigned)
- Giovanni Battista Landi (1633–1647)
- Giambattista Zeccadoro (1648–1696)
- Lorenzo Fabri, O.F.M. Conv. (1697–1709)
- Carlo Palma (1709–1718 Died)
- Eustachio Palma (1718–1754 Died)
- Apollinare Peruzzini, O.E.S.A. (1755–1774 Died)
- Rocco Maria Barsanti, C.R.M. (1775–1779 Appointed, Bishop of Pesaro)
- Felice Paoli (1779–1800 Appointed, Bishop of Recanati e Loreto)

=== 1800 to 1986 ===
- Stefano Bellini (1800–1807 Appointed, Bishop of Recanati e Loreto)
- Giulio Maria Alvisini (1808–1823)
- Luigi Ugolini (1824–1850 Died)
- Filippo Fratellini (1851–1884 Died)
- Alessio Maria Biffoli, O.S.M. (1884–1892 Died)
- Vincenzo Franceschini (1892–1896 Appointed, Bishop of Fano)
- Dionisio Alessandri (1896–1904 Died)
- Achille Quadrozzi (1904–1913 Died)
- Pasquale Righetti (1914–1926 Appointed, Bishop of Savona e Noli)
- Amedeo Polidori (1931–1961 Retired)
- Vittorio Cecchi (1961–1973 Resigned)
- Costanzo Micci (1973–1985 Died)
- Mario Cecchini (1986–1986 Appointed, Bishop of Fano-Fossombrone-Cagli-Pergola)

30 September 1986: United with the Diocese of Cagli e Pergola and the Diocese of Fano to form the Diocese of Fano-Fossombrone-Cagli-Pergola

== Bibliography ==
=== Reference works ===
- Gams, Pius Bonifatius (1873). Series episcoporum Ecclesiae catholicae: quotquot innotuerunt a beato Petro apostolo. Ratisbon: Typis et Sumptibus Georgii Josephi Manz. pp. 698–699. (Use with caution; obsolete)
- Eubel, Conradus, ed. (1913). Hierarchia catholica. Vol. 1 (second ed.). Münster: Libreria Regensbergiana. p. 254. (in Latin)
- Eubel, Conradus, ed. (1914). Hierarchia catholica. Vol. 2 (second ed.). Münster: Libreria Regensbergiana. p. 156.
- Eubel, Conradus; Gulik, Guilelmus, eds. (1923). Hierarchia catholica. Vol. 3 (second ed.). Münster: Libreria Regensbergiana. pp. 198.
- Gauchat, Patritius (Patrice) (1935). Hierarchia catholica. Vol. IV (1592-1667). Münster: Libraria Regensbergiana. p. 189-190.
- Ritzler, Remigius; Sefrin, Pirminus (1952). Hierarchia catholica medii et recentis aevi. Vol. V (1667-1730). Patavii: Messagero di S. Antonio. p. 204.
- Ritzler, Remigius; Sefrin, Pirminus (1958). Hierarchia catholica medii et recentis aevi. Vol. VI (1730-1799). Patavii: Messagero di S. Antonio. p. 218-219.

=== Studies ===
- Benigni, Umberto. "Fossombrone." In: The Catholic Encyclopedia Volume 6 (New York 1906), pp. 154-155. [obsolete]
- Cappelletti, Giuseppe (1845). Le Chiese d'Italia dalla loro origine sino ai nostri giorni (in Italian). Vol. terzo (3). Venezia: nel premiato stabilimento dell'editore Antonelli. pp. 265–283..
- Ceccarelli, Giuseppe (2005). I Vescovi delle Diocesi di Fano, Fossombrone, Cagli e Pergola - Cronotassi. Fano: Fondazione Cassa di Risparmio di Fano.
- Kehr, Paul Fridolin (1909). Italia pontificia. (in Latin). Vol. IV (Berlin: Weidmann 1909), pp. 214-217.
- Lanzoni, Francesco (1927). Le diocesi d'Italia dalle origini al principio del secolo VII (an. 604). (in Italian). Faenza: F. Lega.
- Schwartz, Gerhard (1907). Die Besetzung der Bistümer Reichsitaliens unter den sächsischen und salischen Kaisern: mit den Listen der Bischöfe, 951-1122. (in German). Leipzig: B.G. Teubner. pp. 243-244.
- Ughelli, Ferdinando; Coleti, Niccolò (1717). Italia sacra sive De Episcopis Italiae, et insularum adjacentium (in Italian). Vol. 2 (Tomus secundus). Venice: apud Sebastianum Coleti. pp. 826–840.
- Vernarecci, Augusto (1903). Fossombrone dai tempi antichissimi ai nostri con illustrazioni e appendice di documenti. (in Italian). Volume 2, Part 2. Fossombrone: Monacelli 1903.
