= Piccolomini =

Italian noble family

- Noble family
- Country: Italian Republic; Republic of Siena; Papal States; Grand Duchy of Tuscany; Kingdom of Naples; Holy Roman Empire; Kingdom of the Two Sicilies
- Etymology: lit. 'little men'
- Origin: Probably Kingdom of the Lombards
- Founded: 1098; 928 years ago
- Founder: Martino Piccolomo
- Titles: Pope (non-hereditary); Princes of the Holy Roman Empire; Prince of Náchod; Prince of Valle di Casale; Prince of Maida; Grandee of Spain; Duke of Amalfi; Duke of Laconia; Duke of Girifalco; Duke of Montemarciano; Marquess of Gioiosa; Marquess of Montesoro; Marquess of Città Sant'Angelo; Imperial Count; Count Palatine; Count of Celano and Gagliano; Patricians of Siena; Patrician of Orvieto; Several minor dukedoms, marquisates and counties across Italy.
- Members: Pope Pius II; Pope Pius III; Francesco Piccolomini; Joachim Piccolomini; Francesco Piccolomini; Celio Piccolomini; Marietta Piccolomini
- Motto: Et Deo et hominibus ("both for God and for men")
- Cadet branches: Piccolomini Todeschini; Piccolomini Pieri; Piccolomini Naldi Bandini; Piccolomini Salamoneschi; Piccolomini of Modanella; Piccolomini of Rustichino; Piccolomini Clementini Adami; Piccolomini of Aragon

The House of Piccolomini (pronounced [pikkoˈlɔːmini]) is the name of an Italian noble family, Patricians of Siena, who were prominent from the beginning of the 13th century until the 18th century. The family achieved the recognized titles of Pope of the Catholic Church, Prince of the Holy Roman Empire, Grandee of Spain, and Duke of Amalfi. The family is also featured in Florentine Histories, a book written by Niccolò Machiavelli, where he describes the reign of Pope Pius II, who had allied himself with the Venetians and Prince Vlad Dracula, to wage a war against the Sultan of the Ottoman Empire.

== History ==
In 1220, Engelberto d'Ugo Piccolomini received the fief of Montertari in Val d'Orcia from the Holy Roman Emperor Frederick II as a reward for the services rendered. The family acquired houses and towers in Siena as well as castles and territories in the republic, including Montone and Castiglione; the latter sold to the comune in 1321.

They obtained great wealth through trade, and established counting-houses (merchant banks) in Venice, Genoa, Trieste, Aquileia, and in various cities of France and Germany. Supporters of the Guelph cause in the civil broils by which Siena was torn, they were driven from the city during the time of King Manfred of Sicily. Their houses were demolished but they returned in triumph after the victory of the Angevin Kings. They were expelled once more during the brief reign of King Conradin, and again returned to Siena with the help of King Charles of Anjou. But through their riotous political activity, the Piccolominis lost their commercial influence, which passed into the hands of the Florentines, although they retained their palaces, castles and about twenty fiefs, some of which were in the territory of Amalfi, to a great extent.

Another branch of the family obtained great success in the Kingdom of Naples, becoming one of the "seven great houses" of the Kingdom.

== Ancestry ==
In the 17th century, two Piccolomini brothers, from the Modanella branch, were about to make a large family tree of the family. To seal their ancient genealogy with a legal certification, they commissioned a notary, Alessandro Rocchigiani, to put in order the various sources that disserted the family's origin. Evidently the fascination of myth, mixed with the reverence due to the illustrious patrons, instead of eliminating the legendary components ended up increasing them. Horatius Cocles was indicated with certainty, by the zealous notary, as the new progenitor of the family. Undoubtedly some coincidences arouse astonishment. Indeed, in the column that adorned the Campidoglio, his enterprise, was a coat of arms identical to that of the Sienese family, stood out carved in the shield of the ancient Roman. Once attached to Horace, the Piccolomini lineage had, in ancient Rome, the name of Parenzi, and from there one of its members chose the Sienese colony as his new residence, became Podestà (chief magistrate), and abandoned his name, Chiaramontese, and changed it to Piccholuomo.

The civil discords that agitated Rome in those times favored Siena because of their previous affiliation with the members of the Horatia gens, of which Chiaramontese belonged to. Having left from his homeland in Rome and also his surname, he came to live in the jurisdiction of Siena, and just as it is customary for men from one city when they move to another to take a different name from the usage of their native country, so it happened, Rocchigiani explained, that the Roman exile named Chiaramontese, took on in his new homeland the nickname Piccoluomo (Piccholuomo) from which the surname Piccolomini was later derived. The Piccolominis also descended from a certain Iulius Piccolomini Amideis, a member of the Amidei family, who was also of Roman descent. Pope Pius II, his full name being Enea Silvio Bartolomeo Piccolomini, was named in relation to his Roman ancestry and refers to Aeneas Silvius, King of Alba Longa, from which the Amideis also claimed descent through the gens Julia.

== Prominent family members ==
Many members of the house were distinguished ecclesiastics, generals and statesmen in Siena and elsewhere.

Two of them became popes:

- Enea Silvio Piccolomini (papal name Pope Pius II), supporter of Vlad Dracula against the Sultan of the Ottoman Empire
- Francesco Piccolomini (papal name Pope Pius III), protector of England and Germany, legate to King Charles VIII of France

Other distinguished members include:

- Joachim Piccolomini (1258–1305), beatified Sienese
- Antonio Piccolomini, First Duke of Amalfi (d. 1493), a nephew of Pope Pius II and brother of Pope Pius III
- Alfonso I Piccolomini, Duke of Amalfi (d. 1498), son of Antonio and duke from 1493, hapless husband of Giovanna d'Aragona, Duchess of Amalfi, granddaughter of King Ferdinand I of Naples. He was murdered in 1498. The story of his widow is dramatised in John Webster's play The Duchess of Malfi.
- Giovanni Piccolomini (1475–1537), Archbishop of Siena (1503–1529) Cardinal Priest (1517–1524), Cardinal Bishop (1524–1537), elected by Pope Leo X of the House of Medici
- Girolamo Piccolomini (senior), Bishop of Pienza (1498–1510) and Bishop of Montalcino (1498–1510), elected by Pope Alexander VI of the House of Borgia
- Girolamo Piccolomini (junior), Bishop of Pienza (1510–1535) and Bishop of Montalcino (1510–1528), elected by Pope Julius II of the House of Della Rovere, patron of Michelangelo
- Alessandro Piccolomini (1508–1579), astronomer and author, worked for Lord Cosimo de' Medici of the Medici Bank
- Alessandro Piccolomini, Bishop of Pienza (1535–1563) and Bishop of Montalcino (1528–1554), elected by Pope Clement VII of the House of Medici
- Ascanio I Piccolomini (d. 1597), Archbishop of Siena from 1588, served Pope Gregory XIII who commissioned the Gregorian calendar
- Francesco Piccolomini (Jesuit) (1582–1651), 8th Superior-General of the Society of Jesus
- Ascanio II Piccolomini (1590–1671), Archbishop of Siena from 1629, patron of the Italian astronomer Galileo Galilei
- Ottavio Piccolomini (1599–1656), Imperial general in the Thirty Years' War, prominent in the events leading to Albrecht von Wallenstein's assassination, and basis for a main character in Schiller's Wallenstein. Married to Maria Benigna Francisca of Saxe-Lauenburg, daughter of Duke Julius Henry of Saxe-Lauenburg
- Celio Piccolomini (1609–1681), titular archbishop of Caesarea (1656), created cardinal (1664)
- Costanza Piccolomini Bonarelli (1614–1662), merchant and art dealer, lover and muse of the sculptor Gian Lorenzo Bernini, one of her paintings was sold to Louis XIV and is now at the Louvre
- Enea Silvio Piccolomini (c. 1640–1689), Imperial general in the Great Turkish War, served in the Habsburg army of Leopold I, Holy Roman Emperor
- Marietta Piccolomini (1834–1899), soprano, married to Marquis Francesco Caetani della Fargna, performed for Emperor Napoleon III of the House of Bonaparte

== Castles ==
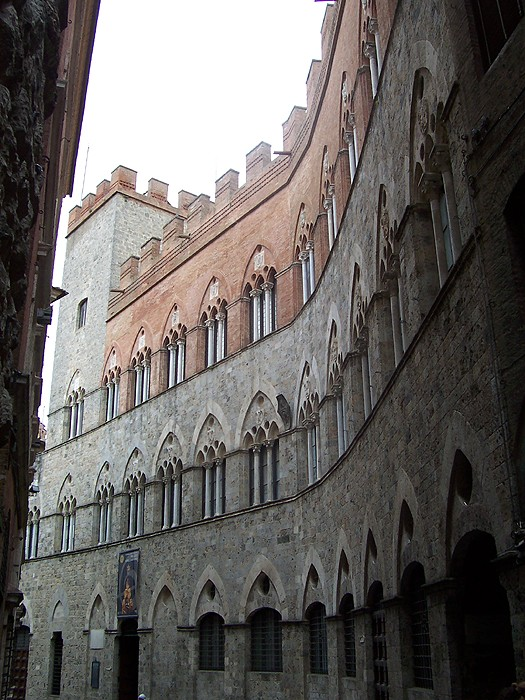
Palazzo Chigi-Saracini, Siena

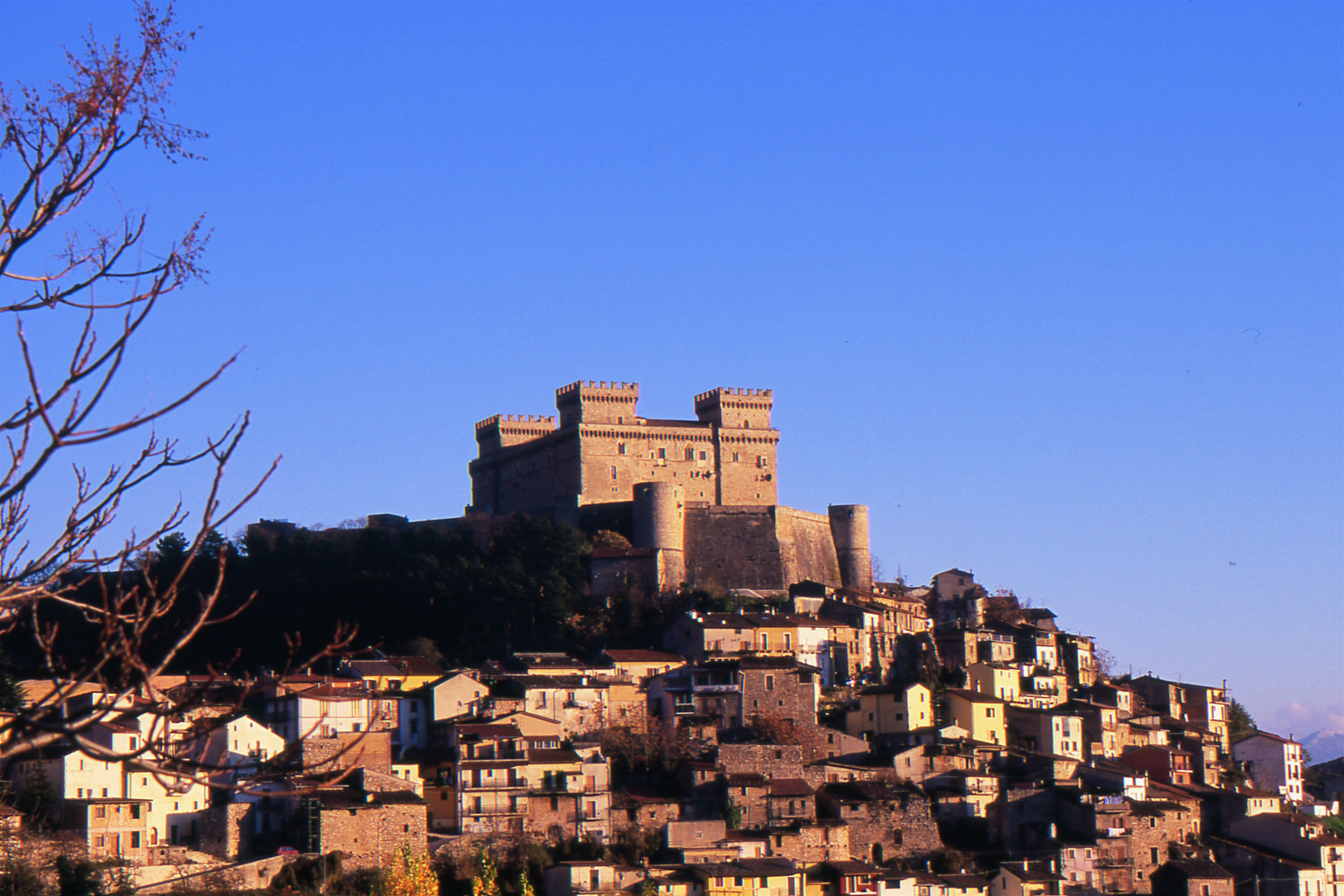
Castello Piccolomini in Celano, Italy

Castello Piccolomini, Italy

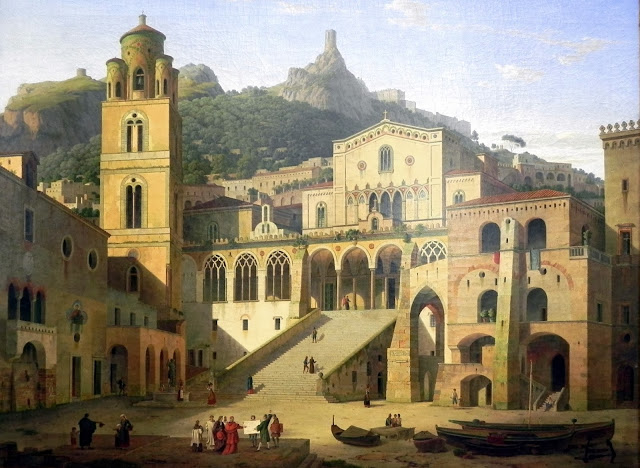
The medieval city of Amalfi in the 17th century

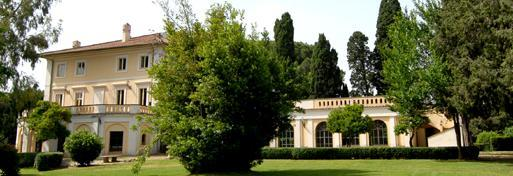
La Casa del Sole – Fondazione Nicolò Piccolomini, Rome

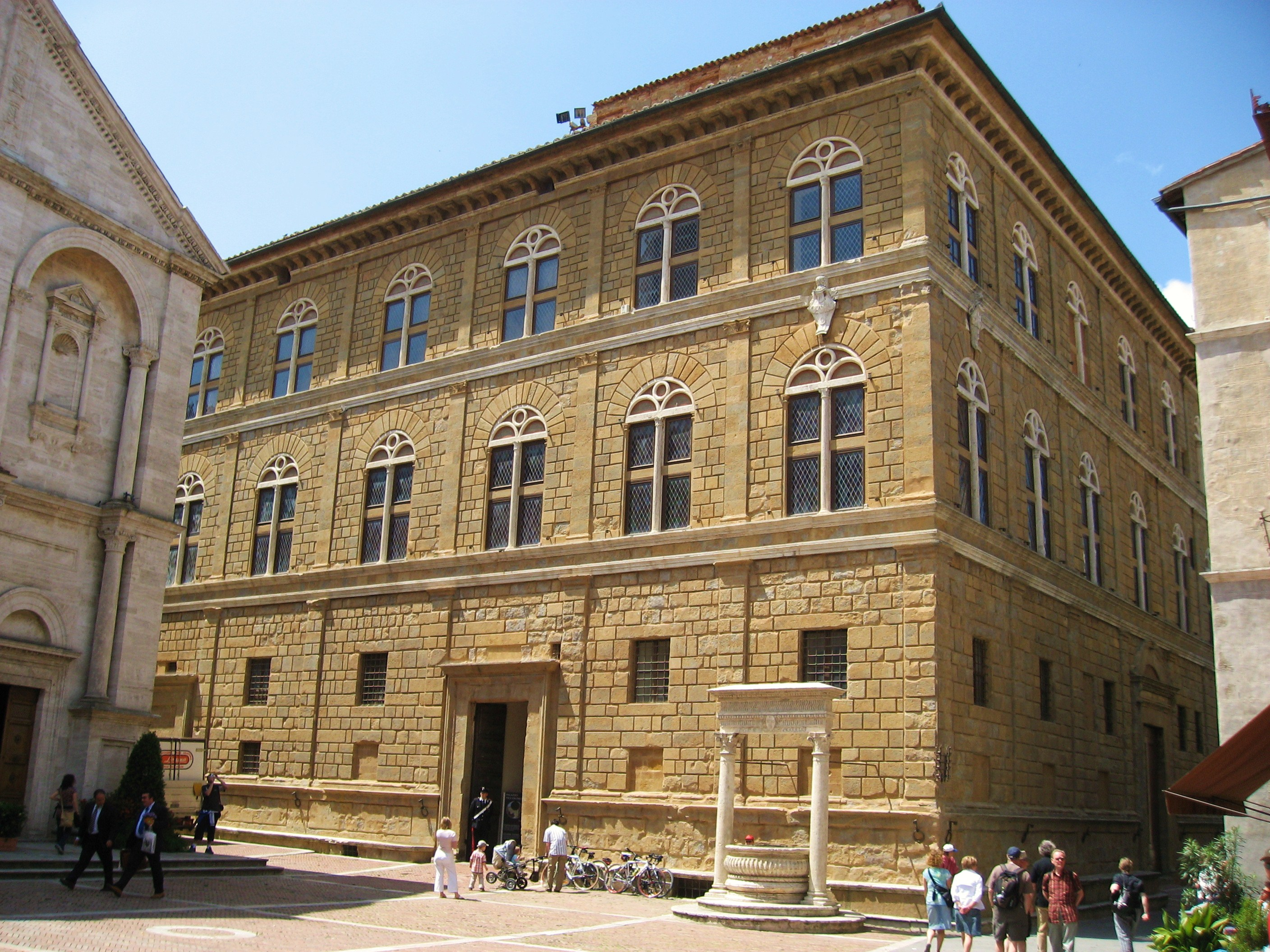
Palazzo Piccolomini Pienza, Italy

Torre Piccolomini, Italy

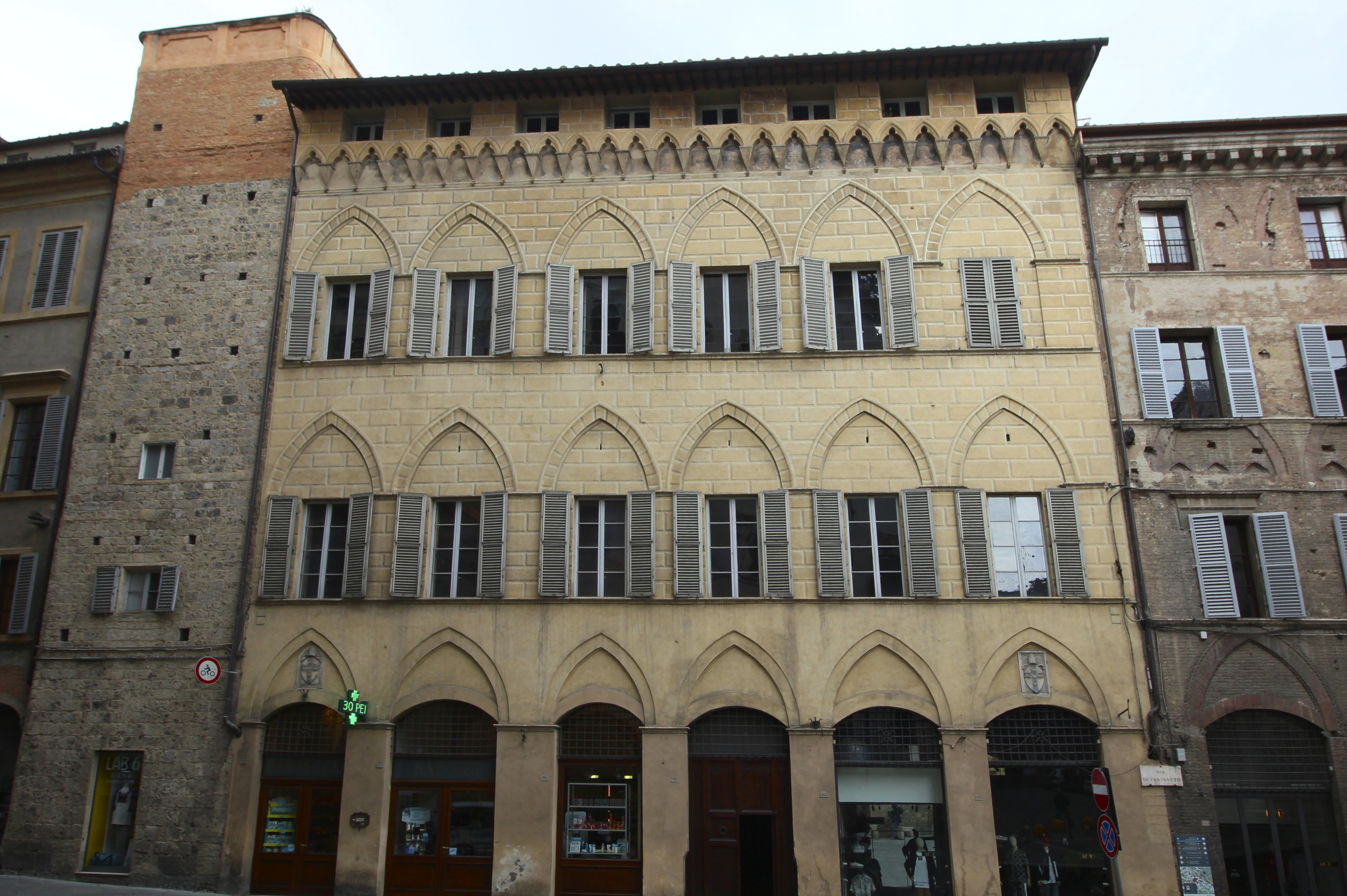
Palazzo Piccolomini-Clementini, Italy

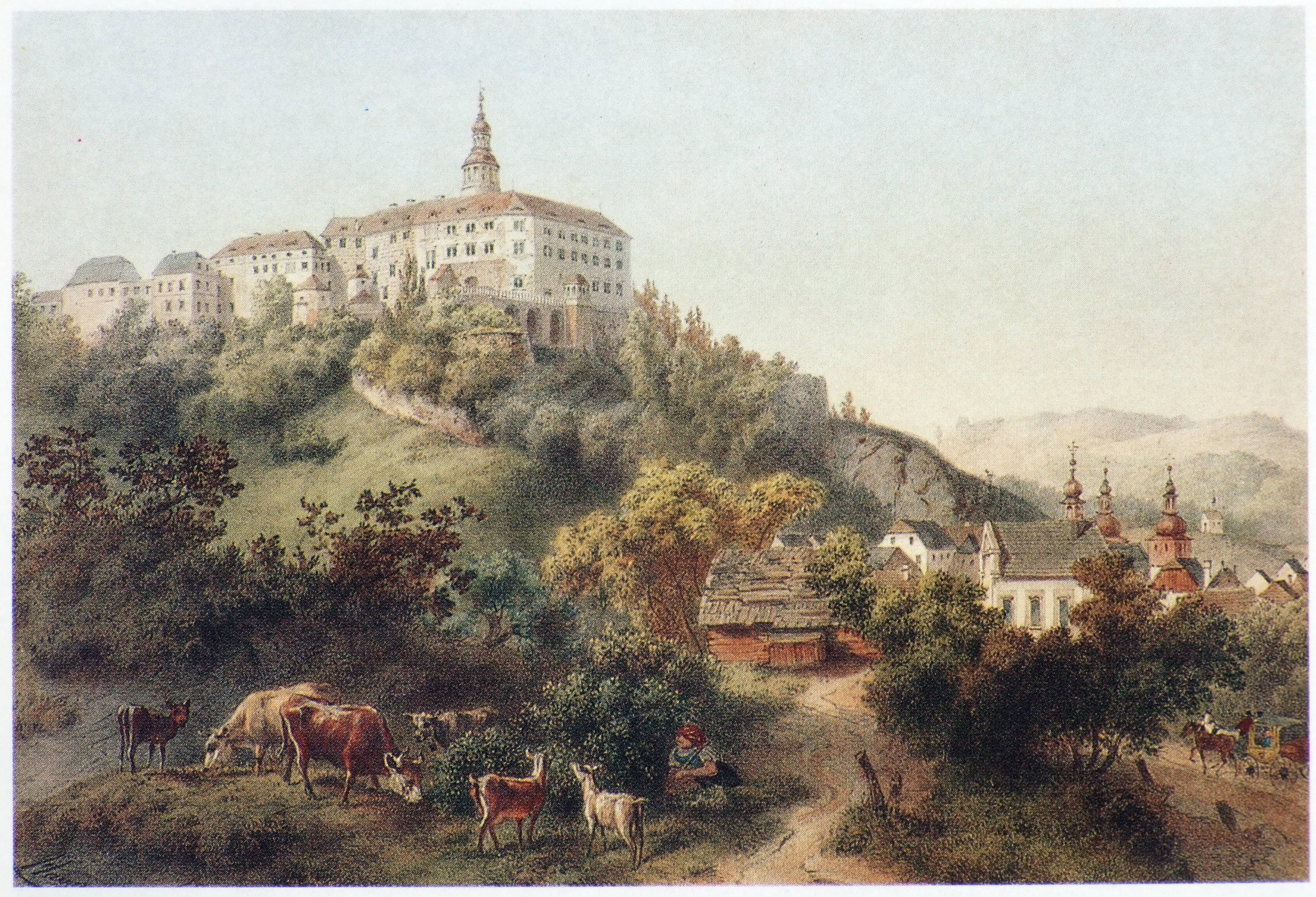
Castello di Náchod, Bohemia, 1740

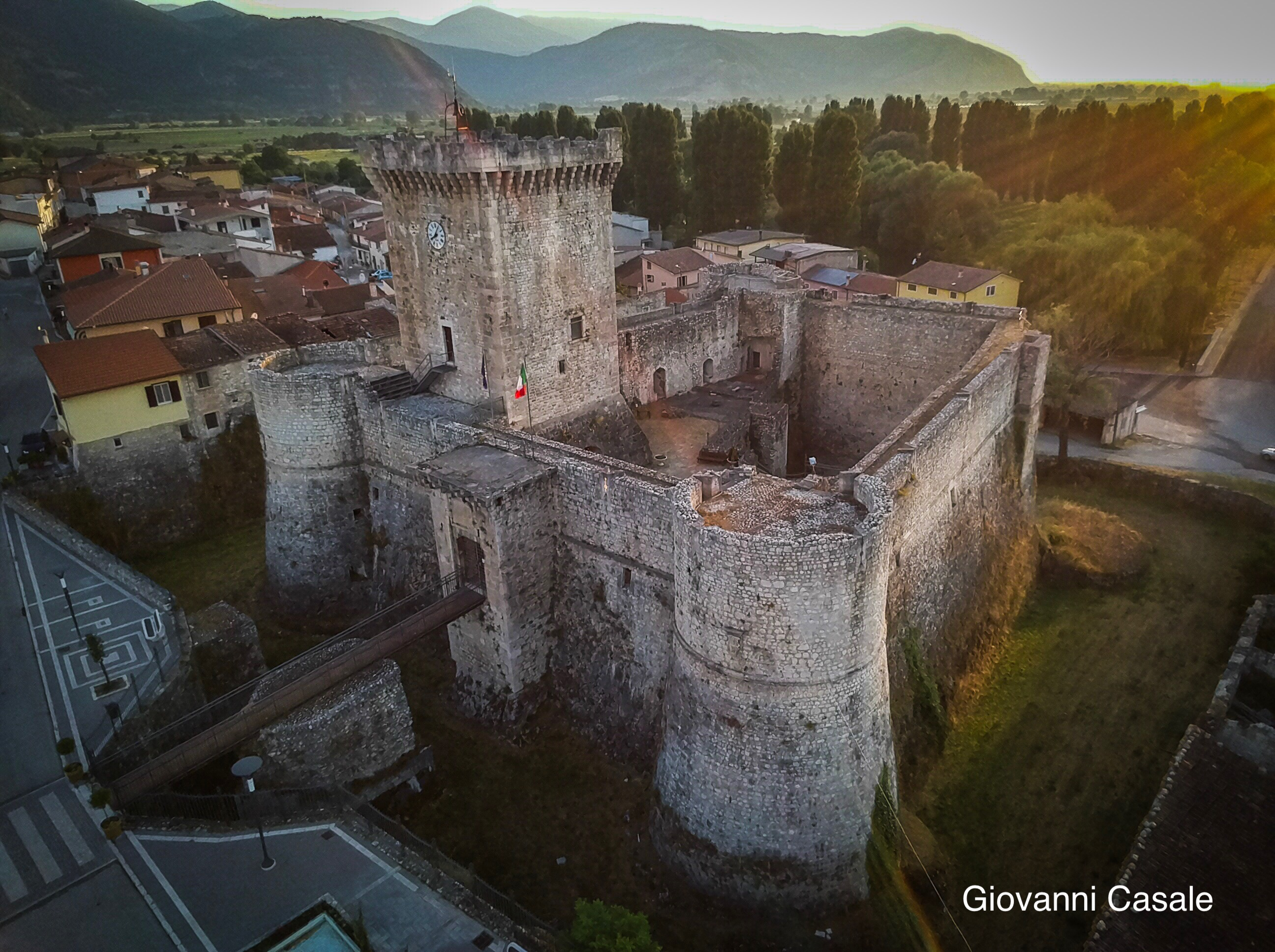
Castello Piccolomini (Ortucchio), Italy

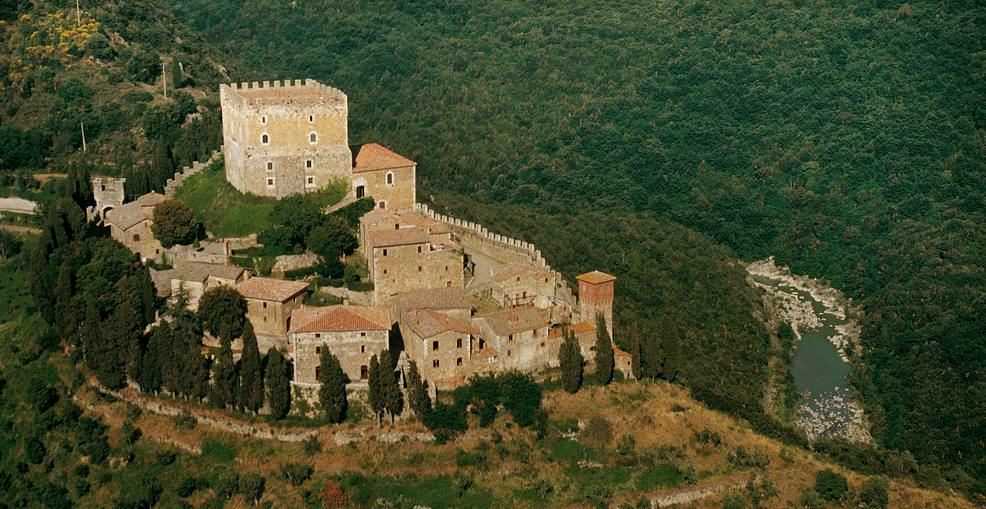
Castello Piccolomini di Ripa d'Orcia, Italy

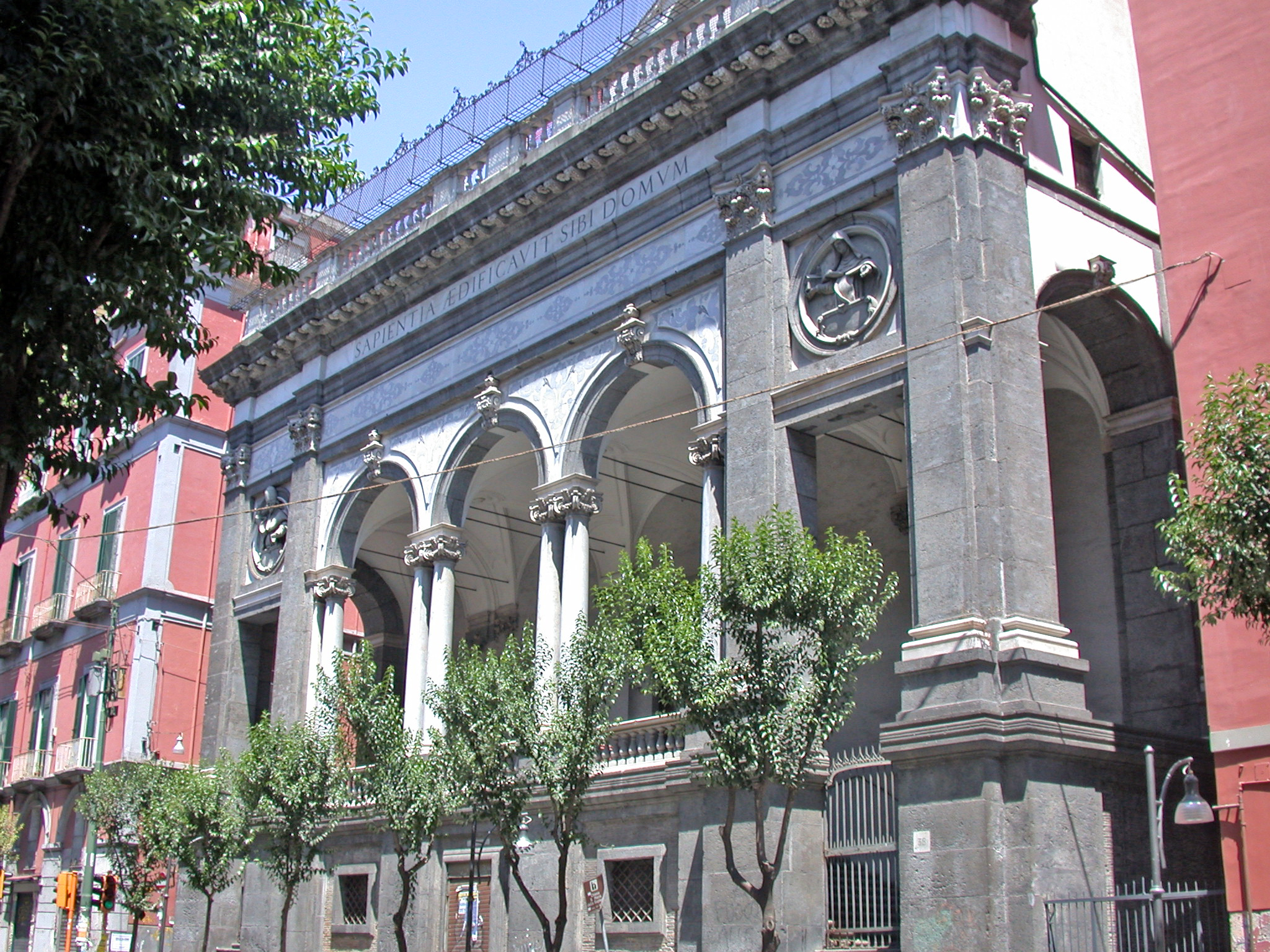
Napoli Santa Maria Della Sapienza

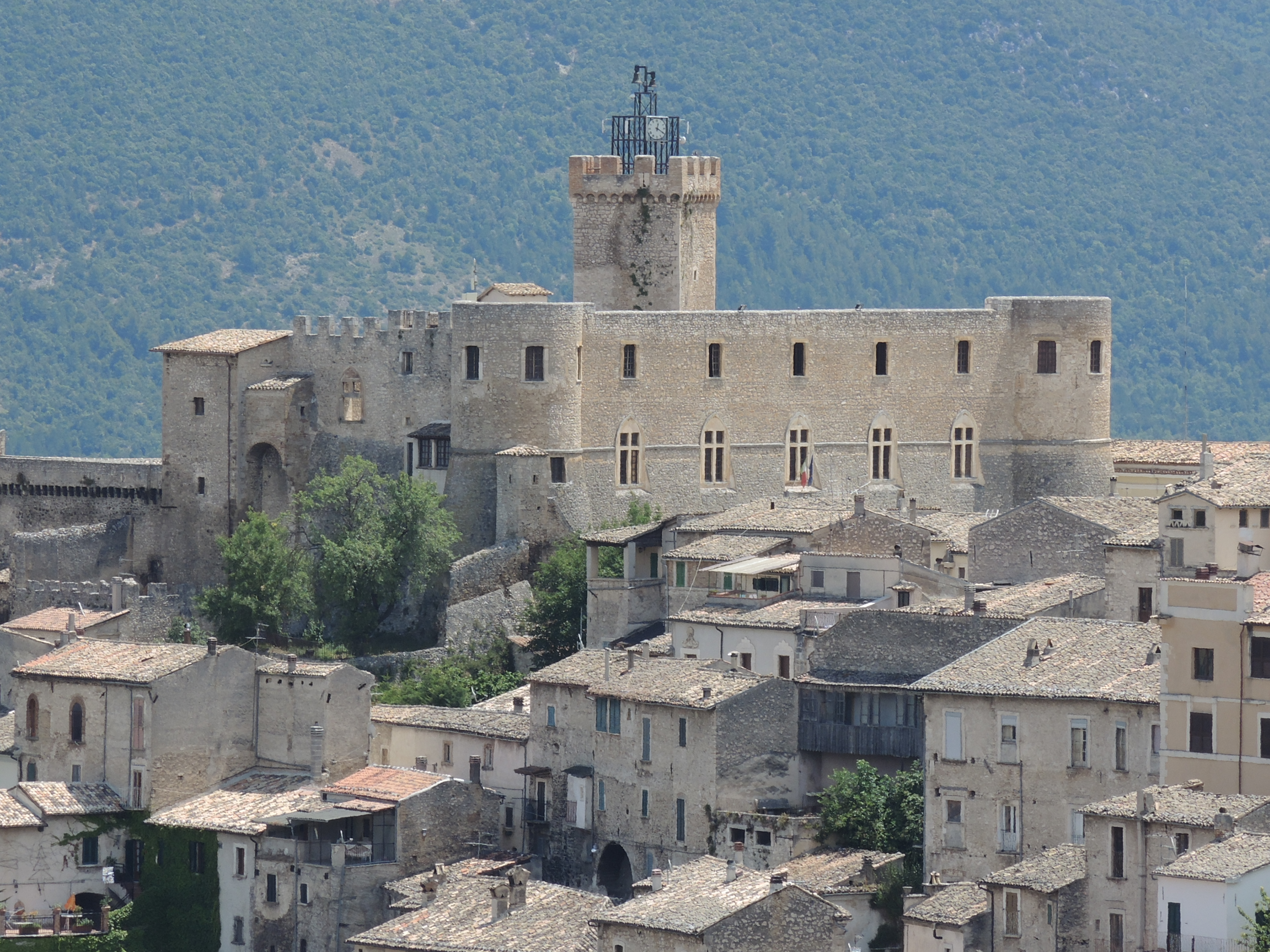
Castello Piccolomini (Capestrano), Italy

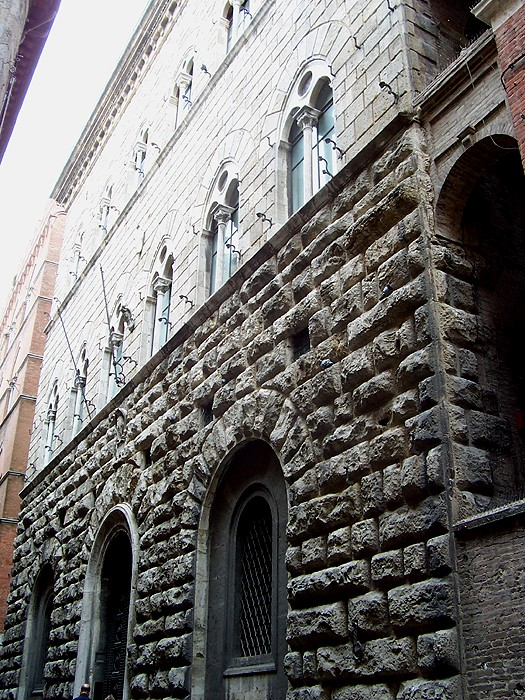
Palazzo delle Papesse, Italy
