= Girolamo Piccolomini =

Girolamo Piccolomini may refer to:

- Girolamo Piccolomini (senior), Roman Catholic prelate
- Girolamo Piccolomini (junior) (died 1535), Roman Catholic prelate
