= Alessandro Bichi =

Italian Catholic Cardinal and papal nuncio

- Cardinal, Bishop of Carpentras
- Church: Catholic Church
- See: Bishop of Carpentras
- Appointed: 9 September 1630
- Term ended: 25 May 1657
- Other post: Apostolic Nuncio to France

Orders
- Consecration: 7 May 1628 (Bishop) by Luigi Cardinal Caetani
- Created cardinal: 28 November 1633

Personal details
- Born: 30 September 1596 Siena
- Died: 25 May 1657 (aged 60) Rome
- Buried: Basilica di Santa Sabina

Alessandro Bichi (30 September 1596 – 25 May 1657) was an Italian Catholic Cardinal and papal nuncio to France.

== Biography ==
Bichi was born in Siena in 1596, the son of Vincenzo Bichi and nephew of Cardinal Metello Bichi. At an early age he became Lieutenant of the Auditor of the Apostolic Chamber during the pontificate of Pope Urban VIII and was then appointed Referendary of the Tribunals of the Apostolic Signatura of Justice and of Grace.

Bichi was elected Bishop of Isola on 5 May 1628) and was immediately sent to Naples as papal nuncio. In 1630, he became nuncio to France and on 9 September 1630, he was appointed Bishop of Carpentras. He was elevated to Cardinal in 1633 and was made Cardinal-Priest of Santa Sabina.

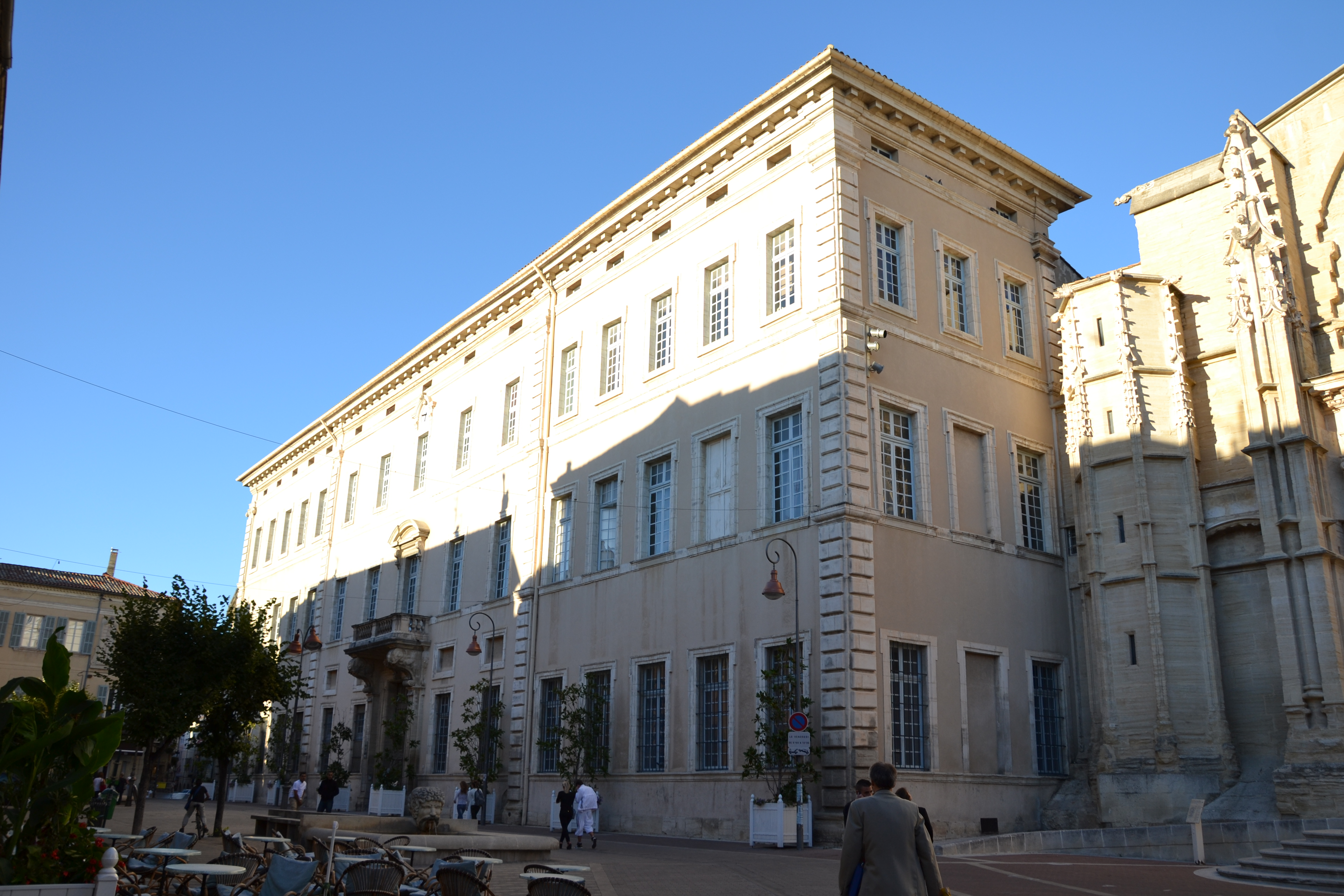
Palace in Carpentras made built by Alessandro Bichi

In 1640, Alessadro Bichi made build by the Avignon architect François Royers de la Valfenière the new episcopal palace of Carpentras, which in 1801 became the Courthouse of the town.

In 1644, Pope Urban VIII died and the College of Cardinals came together in conclave to elected a new Pope. As nuncio to France, Bichi naturally sided with the Cardinals of the French delegation led by Antonio Barberini.

Bichi participated in the conclave of 1655 which elected Pope Alexander VII. Bichi, who was already at odds with Innocent's powerful sister-in-law Olimpia Maidalchini, was said to have exclaimed, "We will elect a female pope".

He died on 25 May 1657 in Rome and was buried in the Basilica di Santa Sabina..

== Episcopal succession ==
While bishop, he was the principal consecrator of:

- Jean de Sponde (bishop), Titular Bishop of Megara and Coadjutor Bishop of Pamiers (1634);
- Cristoforo Tolomei, Bishop of Sovana (1637);
- Giovanni Spennazzi, Bishop of Pienza (1637);
- Francesco Romolo Mileti, Bishop of Segni (1640); and
- Annibale Bentivoglio, Titular Archbishop of Thebae and Apostolic Nuncio to Florence (1645).
