= Castello Piccolomini =

Castello Piccolomini may refer to several castles in the province of L'Aquila, Italy:

- Castello Piccolomini (Balsorano)
- Castello Piccolomini (Capestrano)
- Castello Piccolomini (Celano)
- Castello Piccolomini (Ortucchio)
