= Savo Millini =

Italian cardinal (1644–1701)

- Cardinal-Priest of San Pietro in Vincoli
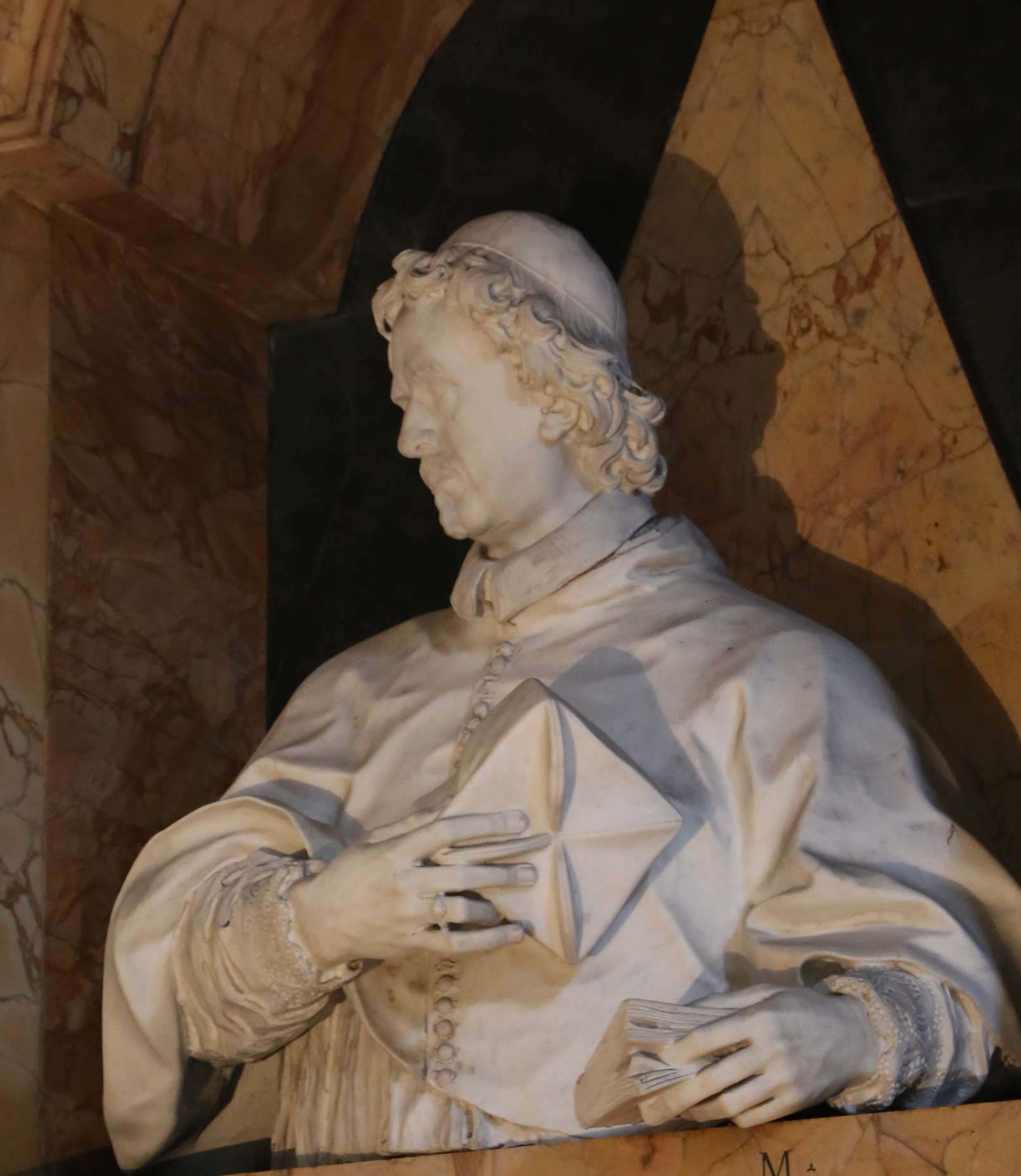
- Church: Catholic Church

Orders
- Consecration: 28 Jun 1675

Personal details
- Born: 5 Jul 1644 Rome, Italy
- Died: 10 Feb 1701 (age 56)

Savo Millini or Savio Mellini (Rome, 4 July 1644 – Rome, 10 February 1701) was a Roman Catholic cardinal.

== Biography ==
Millini was born on 4 July 1644 to Mario and his wife Ginevra (née di Neri Capponi). He was a great-nephew of Cardinal Giovanni Garzia Mellini and both his parents were members of families of the Roman civic nobility. His family and three brothers all fought in the papal armies. He was also related to several cardinals including Mario Millini, Antonio Casali and Giovanni Battista Casali del Drago.

After studying at Rome University, he took orders in 1668. On 28 Jun 1675, he was consecrated as Archbishop of Caesarea. In the same year, he was nominated Papal nuncio to Madrid. He was appointed a cardinal and bishop of Orvieto in 1681.

== Episcopal succession ==
While bishop, he was the principal consecrator of:

- Antonio Medina Cachón y Ponce de León, Bishop of Ceuta (1676);
- Baltasar Tomás Carbonell y Sánchez, Bishop of Sigüenza (1677);
- Antonio de Benavides y Bazán, Titular Archbishop of Tyrus and Patriarch of West Indies (1679);
- Juan Francisco de Padilla y San Martín, Bishop of Puerto Rico (1684);
- Diego Evelino Hurtado de Compostela, Bishop of Santiago de Cuba (1685);
- Fortunato Ilario Carafa della Spina, Bishop of Aversa (1687);
- Sebastiano Delli Frangi, Bishop of Cariati e Cerenzia (1688);
- Romualdo Tancredi, Bishop of Montalcino (1688); and
- Giovanni Vincenzo Lucchesini, Archbishop of Dubrovnik (1689).

Catholic Church titles
| Preceded by Federico Baldeschi Colonna | Titular Archbishop of Caesarea in Cappadocia; 1675–1681 | Succeeded by Giacomo Cantelmo |
| Preceded by Galeazzo Marescotti | Apostolic Nuncio to Spain; 1675–1685 | Succeeded by Marcello Durazzo |
| Preceded by Bernardino Rocci | Archbishop (Personal Title) of Orvieto; 1681–1694 | Succeeded by Giovanni Giuseppe Camuzzi |
| Preceded by Flavio Chigi | Cardinal-Priest of Santa Maria del Popolo; 1686–1689 | Succeeded by Francesco del Giudice |
| Preceded by Pierre de Bonzi | Cardinal-Priest of San Pietro in Vincoli; 1689–1701 | Succeeded by Marcello Durazzo |
| Preceded by Francesco Juste Giusti | Archbishop (Personal Title) of Nepi e Sutri; 1694–1701 | Succeeded by Giuseppe Cianti |
