= Cesare Cibo =

Most Reverend Cesare Cibo
- Archbishop of Turin
- Church: Catholic Church
- Archdiocese: Archdiocese of Turin
- In office: 1548–1562
- Predecessor: Innocenzo Cibo
- Successor: Iñigo Avalos de Aragón

Personal details
- Born: 1495 Genoa, Italy
- Died: 26 December 1562 (aged 66–67)

Cesare Cibo or Cesare Cybo (1495–1532) was a Roman Catholic prelate who served as Archbishop of Turin (1548–1562).

== Biography ==
Cesare Cibo was born in 1495 in Genoa, Italy. On 22 June 1548, he was appointed during the papacy of Pope Paul III as Archbishop of Turin. He served as Archbishop of Turin until his death on 26 December 1562.

== Episcopal succession ==
While bishop, he was the principal co-consecrator of:

- Francesco Maria Piccolomini, Bishop of Montalcino (1554);
- Antonio Agustín, Bishop of Alife (1557);
- Gianantonio Capizucchi, Bishop of Lodi (1557);
- Angelo Massarelli, Bishop of Telese o Cerreto Sannita (1557);
- Giovanni Antonio della Tolfa, Bishop of San Marco (1557); and
- Odoardo Gualandi (Galanti), Bishop of Cesena (1557).

== External links and additional sources ==
- Cheney, David M. "Archdiocese of Torino {Turin}". Catholic-Hierarchy.org. (for Chronology of Bishops) ^{[self-published]}
- Chow, Gabriel. "Metropolitan Archdiocese of Torino (Italy)". GCatholic.org. (for Chronology of Bishops) ^{[self-published]}

Catholic Church titles
Preceded by Innocenzo Cibo	Archbishop of Turin; 1548–1562	Succeeded by Iñigo Avalos de Aragón
