= Ceccon =

Ceccon (Italian: [tʃekˈkon], Venetian: [tʃeˈkoŋ]) is an Italian surname from Veneto, derived from the given name Cecco. Notable people with the surname include:

- Éder Ceccon (born 1983), Brazilian football player
- Kevin Ceccon (born 1993), Italian racing driver
- Paolo Ceccon (born 1996), Italian slalom canoeist
- Thomas Ceccon (born 2001), Italian swimmer

== See also ==
- Cecconi
- Checconi
