= Camillo Borghese =

Camillo Borghese may refer to:

- Pope Paul V (1550–1621), born Camillo Borghese
- Camillo Borghese, 6th Prince of Sulmona (1775–1832)
- Camillo Borghese (archbishop of Siena) (died 1612), Italian Roman Catholic bishop
