= Francesco Pannocchieschi =

Italian Roman Catholic priest and archbishop

Francesco Pannocchieschi d'Elci (1625 or 1626, Florence - 20 June 1702) was an Italian Roman Catholic priest and archbishop.

== Life ==
He came from a noble Sienese family of the Pannocchieschi d'Elci, who held the status of counts. He was the son of count Ranieri and a noblewoman from the Altoviti family. One of Ranieri's brothers was cardinal Scipione Pannocchieschi, whom Francesco accompanied during Scipione's Pontifical Legature to the Republic of Venice (1647-1652). Scipione's Relazione sulle cose della repubblica offers a glimpse of life in Venice at that time. Francesco also assisted Scipione to the court of Ferdinand III, Holy Roman Emperor in Germany (1653-1654).

This acted as an introduction to the church's life in Rome - Francesco became secret chamberlin or 'cubicularius' to the pope and canon of St Peter's Basilica. He succeeded his uncle as archbishop of Pisa in 1663 and made a solemn entrance into Pisa on 23 December 1663. He remained in Pisa for almost forty years, finally dying there on 20 June 1702.

== Episcopal succession ==
While bishop, he was the principal co-consecrator of:

- Fortunato Ilario Carafa della Spina, Bishop of Aversa (1687);
- Innico Caracciolo (iuniore), Bishop of Aversa (1697);
- Bonaventura Poerio, Archbishop of Salerno (1697);
- Luigi Ruzini, Bishop of Bergamo (1698);
- Denis Delfino (patriarch), Titular Bishop of Lorea and Coadjutor Patriarch of Aquileia (1698);
- Uldericus Nardi, Bishop of Bagnoregio (1698);
- Giulio Dalla Rosa, Bishop of Borgo San Donnino (1698);
- Giovanni Francesco Barbarigo, Bishop of Verona (1698);
- Alessandro Carlo Gaetano Varano, Bishop of Macerata e Tolentino (1698);
- Agustín Antonio de Arellano, Archbishop of Brindisi (1698);
- Ambrogio Croce, Bishop of Bobbio (1698);
- Gaetano De Andrea, Bishop of Monopoli (1698);
- Michele Gallo Vandeinde, Bishop of Capri (1698); and
- Antonio Forteguerra, Bishop of Pienza (1698).

== External links and additional sources ==
- Cheney, David M. "Archdiocese of Pisa". Catholic-Hierarchy.org. (for Chronology of Bishops) ^{[self-published]}
- Chow, Gabriel. "Metropolitan Archdiocese of Pisa (Italy)". GCatholic.org. (for Chronology of Bishops) ^{[self-published]}

Catholic Church titles
Preceded by Scipione Pannocchieschi d'Elci	Archbishop of Pisa; 1663–1702	Succeeded by Francesco Frosini
