= Cecconi =

Cecconi (pronounced [tʃekˈkoːni]) is an Italian surname especially from Tuscany and Lazio, derived from the given name Cecco. Notable people with the surname include:

- Eugenio Cecconi (1842–1903), Italian painter
- Giancarlo Cecconi (1935–2012), Italian sport shooter
- Lorenzo Cecconi (1863–1947), Italian painter, restorer and curator
- Luca Cecconi (born 1964), Italian footballer and manager
- Luciano Re Cecconi (1948–1977), Italian footballer
- Maurizia Cecconi (born 1975), Italian synchronized swimmer
- Maurizio Cecconi (born 1977), British-Italian anesthesiologist, intensivist and academic
- Monic Cecconi-Botella (1936–2025), French pianist, music educator and composer
- Slade Cecconi (born 1999), American baseball player
- Walter Cecconi (born 1957), Italian ice dancer

== See also ==
- 27900 Cecconi, a minor planet
- Deroceras cecconii, a species of land slug
- Ceccon
- Checconi
