= Antonio Forteguerra =

18th-century Roman Catholic bishop

Most Reverend Antonio Forteguerra
- Bishop of Pienza
- Church: Catholic Church
- Diocese: Diocese of Pienza
- In office: 1698–1714
- Predecessor: Girolamo Borghese
- Successor: Ascanio Silvestri

Orders
- Consecration: 21 Sep 1698 by Pier Matteo Petrucci

Personal details
- Born: 13 June 1648 Siena, Italy
- Died: January 1714 (aged 65)

Antonio Forteguerra, O.S.B. (1648–1714) was a Roman Catholic prelate who served as Bishop of Pienza (1698–1714).

== Biography ==
Antonio Forteguerra was born on 13 Jun 1648 in Siena, Italy and ordained a priest in the Order of Saint Benedict. On 15 Sep 1698, he was appointed during the papacy of Pope Innocent XII as Bishop of Pienza. On 21 Sep 1698, he was consecrated bishop by Pier Matteo Petrucci, Cardinal-Priest of San Marcello al Corso, with Francesco Pannocchieschi d'Elci, Archbishop of Pisa, and Domenico Belisario de Bellis, Bishop of Molfetta, serving as co-consecrators. He served as Bishop of Pienza until his death in Jan 1714.

== External links and additional sources ==
- Cheney, David M. "Diocese of Pienza". Catholic-Hierarchy.org. (for Chronology of Bishops) ^{[self-published]}
- Chow, Gabriel. "Diocese of Pienza (Italy)". GCatholic.org. (for Chronology of Bishops) ^{[self-published]}

Catholic Church titles
Preceded by Girolamo Borghese	Bishop of Pienza; 1698–1714	Succeeded by Ascanio Silvestri
