= Giovanni Spennazzi =

Most Reverend Giovanni Spennazzi
- Bishop of Pienza
- Church: Catholic Church
- In office: 1637–1658
- Predecessor: Ippolito Borghese (bishop)
- Successor: Giacondo Turamini

Orders
- Consecration: 11 October 1637 by Alessandro Bichi

Personal details
- Born: 1597 Siena, Italy
- Died: 11 August 1658 (aged 60–61)

Giovanni Spennazzi (1597–1658) was a Roman Catholic prelate who served as Bishop of Pienza (1637–1658).

== Biography ==
Giovanni Spennazzi was born in 1597 in Siena, Italy. On 5 October 1637, he was appointed during the papacy of Pope Urban VIII as Bishop of Pienza. On 11 October 1637, he was consecrated bishop by Alessandro Bichi, Bishop of Carpentras, with Tommaso Carafa, Bishop Emeritus of Vulturara e Montecorvino, and Joseph-Marie de Suarès, Bishop of Vaison, serving as co-consecrators. He served as Bishop of Pienza until his death on 11 August 1658.

== External links and additional sources ==
- Cheney, David M. "Diocese of Pienza". Catholic-Hierarchy.org. (for Chronology of Bishops) ^{[self-published]}
- Chow, Gabriel. "Diocese of Pienza (Italy)". GCatholic.org. (for Chronology of Bishops) ^{[self-published]}

Catholic Church titles
Preceded by Ippolito Borghese (bishop)	Bishop of Pienza; 1637–1658	Succeeded by Giacondo Turamini
