= Giuseppe Maria Borgognini =

Italian Roman Catholic prelate

Most Reverend Giuseppe Maria Borgognini
- Bishop of Montalcino
- Church: Catholic Church
- Diocese: Diocese of Montalcino
- In office: 1695–1726
- Predecessor: Romualdo Tancredi
- Successor: Bernardino Ciani

Orders
- Consecration: 4 December 1695 by Ferdinando Cardinal d'Adda

Personal details
- Born: 12 November 1651 Siena, Italy
- Died: November 1726 (age 74)

Giuseppe Maria Borgognini (1651–1726) was a Roman Catholic prelate who served as Bishop of Montalcino (1695–1726).

== Biography ==
Giuseppe Maria Borgognini was born in Siena, Italy on 12 November 1651.

On 28 November 1695, he was appointed Bishop of Montalcino by Pope Innocent XII, the diocese being directly subordinate to the Holy See (Papacy). On 4 December 1695, he was consecrated bishop by Ferdinando Cardinal d'Adda, Cardinal-Priest of San Clemente, with Francesco Gori, Bishop of Catanzaro, and Giovanni Battista Visconti Aicardi, Bishop of Novara, serving as co-consecrators.

He served as Bishop of Montalcino until his death in November 1726.

== External links and additional sources ==
- Cheney, David M. "Diocese of Montalcino". Catholic-Hierarchy.org. (for Chronology of Bishops) ^{[self-published]}
- Chow, Gabriel. "Diocese of Montalcino (Italy)". GCatholic.org. (for Chronology of Bishops) ^{[self-published]}

Catholic Church titles
Preceded by Romualdo Tancredi	Bishop of Montalcino; 1695–1726	Succeeded by Bernardino Ciani
