= Annibale Bentivoglio (bishop) =

17th-century Italian Catholic bishop

Most Reverend Annibale Bentivoglio
- Titular Archbishop of Thebae
- Church: Catholic Church
- In office: 1645–1663
- Predecessor: Lelio Falconieri
- Successor: Niccolo Pietro Bargellini
- Previous post: Apostolic Nuncio to Florence (1645–1652)

Orders
- Consecration: 19 March 1645 by Alessandro Bichi

Personal details
- Born: Bologna, Italy
- Died: Florence, Italy

Annibale Bentivoglio (died 1663) was a Roman Catholic prelate who served as Titular Archbishop of Thebae (1645–1663) and Apostolic Nuncio to Florence (1645–1652).

== Biography ==
Annibale Bentivoglio was born in Bologna, Italy. On 6 March 1645, he was appointed during the papacy of Pope Innocent X as Titular Archbishop of Thebae. On 19 March 1645, he was consecrated bishop by Alessandro Bichi, Bishop of Carpentras, with Alfonso Gonzaga, Titular Archbishop of Rhodus, and Giovanni de Torres, Titular Archbishop of Hadrianopolis in Haemimonto, serving as co-consecrators. On 20 April 1645, he was appointed during the papacy of Pope Innocent X as Apostolic Nuncio to Florence. In November 1652, he resigned as Apostolic Nuncio to Florence. He served as Titular Archbishop of Thebae until his death on 21 April 1663 in Florence, Italy.

== Episcopal succession ==
Episcopal succession of Annibale Bentivoglio

While bishop, he was the principal consecrator of:

- Carlo de' Medici (cardinal), Cardinal-Bishop of Sabina (1645);

and the principal co-consecrator of:

- Giacomo Corradi, Bishop of Jesi (1653); and
- Francesco Rinuccini, Bishop of Pistoia e Prato (1656).

Catholic Church titles
Preceded by Camillo Melzi	Apostolic Nuncio to Florence; 1645–1652	Succeeded by Antonio Pignatelli del Rastrello
Preceded by Lelio Falconieri	Titular Archbishop of Thebae; 1645–1663	Succeeded by Niccolo Pietro Bargellini
