= Gregor Helfenstein =

German prelate (1559–1632)

Most Reverend Gregor Helfenstein
- Auxiliary Bishop Emeritus of Trier; Titular Bishop of Azotus
- Church: Catholic Church
- Diocese: Diocese of Trier
- In office: 1599–1632

Orders
- Consecration: 1 November 1599 by Ottavio Paravicini

Personal details
- Born: 1559 Oberemmel, Germany
- Died: 21 October 1632 (age 73) Trier, Germany

Gregor Helfenstein (1559–1632) was a Roman Catholic prelate who served as Auxiliary Bishop of Trier (1599–1632).

== Biography ==
Gregor Helfenstein was born in the village of Oberemmel, near Konz, Germany in 1559. On 29 October 1599, he was appointed during the papacy of Pope Clement VIII as Auxiliary Bishop of Trier and Titular Bishop of Azotus. On 1 November 1599, was consecrated bishop by Ottavio Paravicini, Cardinal-Priest of Sant'Alessio. He served as Auxiliary Bishop of Trier until his death on 21 October 1632.

== Episcopal succession ==
While bishop, he was the principal co-consecrator of:

- Lothar von Metternich, Archbishop of Trier (1600);
- Johann Schweikard von Kronberg, Archbishop of Mainz (1604);
- Philipp Christoph von Sötern, Coadjutor Bishop of Speyer (1612); and
- Wilhelm von Essern (Effern), Bishop of Worms (1612).
