= Giacondo Turamini =

Most Reverend Giacondo Turamini
- Bishop of Pienza
- Church: Catholic Church
- Diocese: Diocese of Pienza
- In office: 1664–1665
- Predecessor: Giovanni Spennazzi
- Successor: Giovanni Checconi

Personal details
- Died: 17 January 1665

Giacondo Turamini (died 1665) was a Roman Catholic prelate who served as Bishop of Pienza (1664–1665).

== Biography ==
On 31 March 1664, Giacondo Turamini was appointed during the papacy of Pope Alexander VII as Bishop of Pienza. He served as Bishop of Pienza until his death on 17 January 1665.

== External links and additional sources ==
- Cheney, David M. "Diocese of Pienza". Catholic-Hierarchy.org. (for Chronology of Bishops) ^{[self-published]}
- Chow, Gabriel. "Diocese of Pienza (Italy)". GCatholic.org. (for Chronology of Bishops) ^{[self-published]}

Catholic Church titles
Preceded by Giovanni Spennazzi	Bishop of Pienza; 1664–1665	Succeeded by Giovanni Checconi
