= Agostino Patrizi Piccolomini =

Italian catholic bishop

Most Reverend Agostino Patrizi Piccolomini
- Bishop of Pienza; Bishop of Montalcino
- Church: Catholic Church
- Diocese: Diocese of Pienza; Diocese of Montalcino
- In office: 1484–1495
- Predecessor: Tommaso della Testa Piccolomini
- Successor: Francesco Todeschini-Piccolomini

Personal details
- Died: 1495

Agostino Patrizi Piccolomini (died 1495) was a Roman Catholic prelate who served as Bishop of Pienza (1484–1495) and Bishop of Montalcino (1484–1495).

== Biography ==
Having been private secretary of Pope Pius II, on the latter's death on 14 August 1464, Patrizi entered the service of the pope's nephew, Cardinal Francesco Todeschini Piccolomini and in 1471, he accompanied the cardinal in that capacity on a journey to Germany to attend the Imperial Diet at Ratisbon. Patrizi also served as a master of ceremonies in the papal chapel under Pope Paul II, resigning the post on 26 January 1484, subsequent to his appointment on 19 January as Bishop of Pienza and Bishop of Montalcino by Pope Sixtus IV.

On 14 March 1484, he was consecrated bishop by Constantin Eruli, Bishop of Spoleto, with Gabriele Maccafani, Bishop of Marsi, and Giovanni Battista Capranica, Bishop of Fermo, serving as co-consecrators. It was under his new title, Augustinus episcopus Pientinus et Ilcinensis. that he participated in the papal consistory of 20 December 1484, and is also known to have participated in the canonization of Saint Leopold of Austria on 6 January 1485.

While he was to hold the titles of Bishop of Pienza and Bishop of Montalcino until his death in 1495, or perhaps more probably on 3 July 1496, his real work was in Rome. He served as papal Master of Ceremonies from 1483, by appointment of Pope Paul II and after a brief interruption in 1484–1485, he was reappointed by Pope Innocent VIII on 24 December 1485. Having published on 1 March 1488 the first systematic description of ceremonies connected with the papal court, the Sacrarum caeremoniarum sive rituum ecclesiasticorum Sanctae Romanae ecclesiae libri tres. he relinquished the post definitively in May that year.

== Sources ==
- Avesani, Rino (1964). "Per la Biblioteca di Agostino Patrizi Piccolomini, vescovo di Pienza." In" Mélanges Eugène Tisserant Vol. VI, part 1 (Città del Vaticano 1964), pp. 1–37. (in Italian)
- Burchard, Johannes (1883). Thuasne, L. (ed.). Diarum sine rerum urbanarum commentarii: 1483-1506 (in Latin and French). Paris: Leroux.
- Dykmans, Marc (1980). L'Oeuvre de Patrizi Piccolomini ou le cérémonial papal de la première Renaissance: Livre premier (in French). Città del Vaticano: Biblioteca apostolica vaticana. pp. xix–xx. ISBN 978-88-210-0518-3.
- Mussari, Bruno (2008). "Palazzo Patrizi a Siena consistenza e ricognizione di un palazzo di fine '600 dai documenti d'acquisto ealcuni inventari." In: Quaderni PAU: Rivista semestrale del Dipartimento Patrimonio Architettonico e Urbanistico dell'Università di Reggio Calabria (in Italian). Vol. Anno XVIII. Gangemi Editore spa. 2008. pp. 77–9, at 93. ISBN 978-88-492-6774-7.

Catholic Church titles
Preceded by Tommaso della Testa Piccolomini	Bishop of Pienza; 1484–1495	Succeeded by Francesco Todeschini-Piccolomini
Preceded by Tommaso della Testa Piccolomini	Bishop of Montalcino; 1484–1495	Succeeded by Francesco Todeschini-Piccolomini
