= Ippolito Borghese (bishop) =

Italian Catholic bishop (1576–1637)

Most Reverend Ippolito Borghese
- Bishop of Pienza
- Church: Catholic Church
- Diocese: Diocese of Pienza
- In office: 1636–1637
- Predecessor: Scipione Pannocchieschi d'Elci
- Successor: Giovanni Spennazzi
- Previous post: Bishop of Montalcino (1618–1636)

Orders
- Consecration: 22 April 1618 by Giambattista Leni

Personal details
- Born: 1576 Siena, Italy
- Died: March 1637 (age 61) Pienza, Italy

Ippolito Borghese, O.S.B. (1576–1637) was an Italian Roman Catholic prelate who served as Bishop of Pienza (1636–1637) and Bishop of Montalcino (1618–1636).

== Biography ==
Ippolito Borghese, was born in Siena, Italy in 1576 and ordained a priest in the Order of Saint Benedict. On 26 March 1618, he was appointed during the papacy of Pope Paul V as Bishop of Montalcino. On 22 April 1618, he was consecrated bishop by Giambattista Leni, Bishop of Ferrara, with Francesco Sacrati, Titular Archbishop of Damascus, and Evangelista Tornioli, Bishop of Città di Castello, serving as co-consecrators. On 1 September 1636, he was appointed during the papacy of Pope Urban VIII as Bishop of Pienza. He served as Bishop of Pienza until his death in March 1637.

== External links and additional sources ==
- Cheney, David M. "Diocese of Montalcino". Catholic-Hierarchy.org. (for Chronology of Bishops) ^{[self-published]}
- Chow, Gabriel. "Diocese of Montalcino (Italy)". GCatholic.org. (for Chronology of Bishops) ^{[self-published]}
- Cheney, David M. "Diocese of Pienza". Catholic-Hierarchy.org. (for Chronology of Bishops) ^{[self-published]}
- Chow, Gabriel. "Diocese of Pienza (Italy)". GCatholic.org. (for Chronology of Bishops) ^{[self-published]}

Catholic Church titles
Preceded by Mario Cossa	Bishop of Montalcino; 1618–1636	Succeeded by Scipione Tancredi
Preceded by Scipione Pannocchieschi d'Elci	Bishop of Pienza; 1636–1637	Succeeded by Giovanni Spennazzi
