= Romualdo Tancredi =

Italian Roman Catholic prelate

Most Reverend Romualdo Tancredi
- Bishop of Montalcino
- Church: Catholic Church
- Diocese: Diocese of Montalcino
- In office: 1688–1694
- Predecessor: Fabio de Vecchi
- Successor: Giuseppe Maria Borgognini

Orders
- Consecration: 22 August 1688 by Savo Millini

Personal details
- Born: 7 July 1637 Siena, Italy
- Died: December 1694 (age 57)

Romualdo Tancredi, O.S.B. (1637–1694) was a Roman Catholic prelate who served as Bishop of Montalcino (1688–1694).

== Biography ==
Romualdo Tancredi was born on 7 July 1637 in Siena, Italy and ordained a priest in the Order of Saint Benedict. On 9 August 1688, he was appointed during the papacy of Pope Innocent XI as Bishop of Montalcino. On 22 August 1688, he was consecrated bishop by Savo Millini, Bishop of Orvieto, with Pietro Francesco Orsini de Gravina, Archbishop of Benevento, and Gianfrancesco Riccamonti, Bishop of Cervia, serving as co-consecrators. He served as Bishop of Montalcino until his death in December 1694.

== External links and additional sources ==
- Cheney, David M. "Diocese of Montalcino". Catholic-Hierarchy.org. (for Chronology of Bishops) ^{[self-published]}
- Chow, Gabriel. "Diocese of Montalcino (Italy)". GCatholic.org. (for Chronology of Bishops) ^{[self-published]}

Catholic Church titles
Preceded by Fabio de Vecchi	Bishop of Montalcino; 1688–1694	Succeeded by Giuseppe Maria Borgognini
