= Girolamo Borghese =

Italian Roman Catholic prelate (1616–1698)

Most Reverend Girolamo Borghese
- Bishop of Pienza
- Church: Catholic Church
- Diocese: Diocese of Pienza
- In office: 1668–1698
- Predecessor: Giovanni Checconi
- Successor: Antonio Forteguerra
- Previous post: Bishop of Sovana (1652–1668)

Orders
- Consecration: 29 December 1652 by Marcantonio Franciotti

Personal details
- Born: 11 January 1616 Siena, Italy
- Died: 15 January 1698 (age 82) Pienza, Italy

Girolamo Borghese, O.S.B. (11 January 1616 – 15 January 1698) was a Roman Catholic prelate who served as Bishop of Pienza (1668–1698) and Bishop of Sovana (1652–1668).

== Biography ==
Girolamo Borghese was born in Siena, Italy on 11 January 1616 and ordained a priest in the Order of Saint Benedict. On 11 December 1652, he was appointed Bishop of Sovana by Pope Innocent X. On 29 December 1652, he was consecrated bishop by Marcantonio Franciotti, Cardinal-Priest of Santa Maria della Pace, with Ranuccio Scotti Douglas, Bishop Emeritus of Borgo San Donnino, serving as co-consecrators. On 17 December 1668, he was transferred to the diocese of Pienza by Pope Clement IX.

He served as Bishop of Pienza until his death on 15 January 1698.

== External links and additional sources ==
- Cheney, David M. "Diocese of Pitigliano-Sovana-Orbetello". Catholic-Hierarchy.org. (for Chronology of Bishops) ^{[self-published]}
- Chow, Gabriel. "Diocese of Pitigliano-Sovana-Orbetello (Italy)". GCatholic.org. (for Chronology of Bishops) ^{[self-published]}
- Cheney, David M. "Diocese of Pienza". Catholic-Hierarchy.org. (for Chronology of Bishops) ^{[self-published]}
- Chow, Gabriel. "Diocese of Pienza (Italy)". GCatholic.org. (for Chronology of Bishops) ^{[self-published]}

Catholic Church titles
Preceded by Marcello Cervini (bishop)	Bishop of Sovana; 1652–1668	Succeeded by Girolamo Cori
Preceded by Giovanni Checconi	Bishop of Pienza; 1668–1698	Succeeded by Antonio Forteguerra
