= Francesco Maria Piccolomini =

Italian Roman Catholic prelate (died 1599)

Most Reverend Francesco Maria Piccolomini
- Bishop of Montalcino; Bishop of Pienza
- Church: Catholic Church
- Diocese: Diocese of Montalcino
- In office: 1554–1599
- Predecessor: Alessandro Piccolomini
- Successor: Camillo Borghese (archbishop)

Orders
- Consecration: 25 November 1554 by Scipione Bongalli

Personal details
- Died: 1599

Francesco Maria Piccolomini (died 1599) was a Roman Catholic prelate who served as Bishop of Montalcino (1554–1599) and Bishop of Pienza (1563–1599).

== Biography ==
On 20 April 1554, Francesco Maria Piccolomini was appointed during the papacy of Pope Julius III as Bishop of Montalcino. On 25 November 1554, he was consecrated bishop by Scipione Bongalli, Bishop of Civita Castellana e Orte, with Cesare Cibo, Archbishop of Turin, and Alessandro Piccolomini, Bishop of Pienza, serving as co-consecrators. In December 1563, he was appointed during the papacy of Pope Pius IV as Bishop of Pienza. He served as Bishop of Montalcino and Bishop of Pienza until his death in 1599.

== Episcopal succession ==
While bishop, he was the principal co-consecrator of:

- Giovanni Antonio Locatelli, Bishop of Venosa (1568);
- Cipriano Pallavicino, Archbishop of Genoa 1568); and
- Ascanio Piccolomini, Titular Archbishop of Colossae and Coadjutor Archbishop of Siena (1579).

== External links and additional sources ==
- Cheney, David M. "Diocese of Montalcino". Catholic-Hierarchy.org. (for Chronology of Bishops) ^{[self-published]}
- Chow, Gabriel. "Diocese of Montalcino (Italy)". GCatholic.org. (for Chronology of Bishops) ^{[self-published]}
- Cheney, David M. "Diocese of Pienza". Catholic-Hierarchy.org. (for Chronology of Bishops) ^{[self-published]}
- Chow, Gabriel. "Diocese of Pienza (Italy)". GCatholic.org. (for Chronology of Bishops) ^{[self-published]}

Catholic Church titles
Preceded by Alessandro Piccolomini	Bishop of Pienza; 1554–156	Succeeded by Gioia Dragomani
Preceded by Alessandro Piccolomini	Bishop of Montalcino; 1563–1599	Succeeded by Camillo Borghese (archbishop)
