= Ottavio Paravicini =

17th-century Catholic cardinal

His Eminence Ottavio Paravicini
- Cardinal-Priest of Santi Bonifacio ed Alessio
- Church: Catholic Church

Orders
- Consecration: 15 Jul 1584 by Charles Borromeo

Personal details
- Born: 11 Jul 1552 Rome, Italy
- Died: 3 Feb 1611 (age 58)

Ottavio Paravicini (1552–1611) was a Roman Catholic cardinal.

== Early life ==
Born into the Paravicini, noble family from Valtellina, he was the son of Giovanni Michele Paravicini and Lomellina Laudata of Gaeta.

== Biography ==
On 15 Jul 1584, he was consecrated bishop by Charles Borromeo, Archbishop of Milan, with Filippo Sega, Bishop of Piacenza, and Francesco Bossi, Bishop of Novara, serving as co-consecrators.

== Episcopal succession ==
While bishop, he was the principal consecrator of:

- Camillo Borghese, Bishop of Castro di Puglia (1594);
- Filippo Archinto, Bishop of Como (1595);
- Eugenio Savino, Bishop of Telese o Cerreto Sannita (1596);
- Johann Jakob Mirgel, Titular Bishop of Sebaste in Cilicia and Auxiliary Bishop of Konstanz (1598);
- Ursino de Bertiis, Bishop of Trieste (1598);
- Vittorino Mansi, Bishop of Castellammare di Stabia (1599);
- Francisco Velarde de la Cuenca, Archbishop of Messina (1599);
- Gregor Helfenstein, Titular Bishop of Azotus and Auxiliary Bishop of Trier (1599);
- Placido Fava, Bishop of Castro di Puglia (1600);
- Camillo Olario (Aulari, Ozario), Bishop of Bobbio (1602);
- Lucio de Morra, Archbishop of Otranto (1606);
- Istvan Szentandrássy (Cecchio), Bishop of Smederevo (1606);
- Juan Beltrán Guevara y Figueroa, Archbishop of Salerno (1606);
- Giulio Lana, Bishop of Vulturara e Montecorvino (1606);
- Giambattista Leni, Bishop of Mileto (1608);

and the principal co-consecrator of:

- Girolamo Bernerio, Bishop of Ascoli Piceno (1586);
- Giovanni Evangelista Pallotta, Archbishop of Cosenza (1587); and
- Marcello Lante della Rovere, Bishop of Todi (1607).

Catholic Church titles
Preceded by Guarnerio Trotti	Bishop of Alessandria della Paglia; 1584–1596	Succeeded by Pietro Giorgio Odescalchi
Preceded by Giovanni Battista Santorio	Apostolic Nuncio to Switzerland; 1587–1591	Succeeded by Owen Lewis (bishop)
Preceded by Gian Girolamo Albani	Cardinal-Priest of San Giovanni a Porta Latina; 1591–1592	Succeeded by Alfonso Visconti
Preceded by Giovanni Vincenzo Gonzaga	Cardinal-Priest of Sant'Alessio; 1592–1611	Succeeded by Metello Bichi
