= Ottavio Saraceni =

Most Reverend Ottavio Saraceni
- Bishop of Sovana
- Church: Catholic Church
- Diocese: Diocese of Sovana
- In office: 1606–1623
- Predecessor: Metello Bichi
- Successor: Scipione Tancredi

Orders
- Consecration: 2 Jul 1606 by Giovanni Delfino

Personal details
- Died: 1623 Monticchiello, Italy

Ottavio Saraceni or Octavius Saraceni (died 1623) was a Roman Catholic prelate who served as Bishop of Sovana (1606–1623).

== Biography ==
On 12 Jun 1606, Ottavio Saraceni was appointed during the papacy of Pope Paul V as Bishop of Sovana. On 2 Jul 1606, he was consecrated bishop by Giovanni Delfino, Cardinal-Priest of San Marco, with Fabio Blondus de Montealto, Titular Patriarch of Jerusalem, and Bishop Metello Bichi, Bishop Emeritus of Sovana, serving as co-consecrators. He served as Bishop of Sovana until his death in 1623.

Catholic Church titles
Preceded by Metello Bichi	Bishop of Sovana; 1606–1623	Succeeded by Scipione Tancredi
