= Metello Bichi =

Roman Catholic cardinal

His Eminence Metello Bichi
- Cardinal-Priest of Sant'Alessio; Archbishop Emeritus of Siena
- Church: Catholic Church

Orders
- Consecration: 18 Feb 1596 by Alessandro Ottaviano de' Medici

Personal details
- Born: 1541 Siena, Italy
- Died: 14 Jun 1619 (age 78) Rome, Italy

Metello Bichi (1541–1619) was a Roman Catholic cardinal.

== Biography ==
On 18 Feb 1596, he was consecrated bishop by Alessandro Ottaviano de' Medici, Archbishop of Florence, with Matteo Sanminiato, Archbishop of Chieti, and Cristóbal Robuster y Senmanat, Bishop Emeritus of Orihuela, serving as co-consecrators.

== Episcopal succession ==
Episcopal succession of Metello Bichi

While bishop, he was the principal consecrator of:

- Fabio Piccolomini, Bishop of Massa Marittima (1615);
- Bernardino Buratti, Bishop of Vulturara e Montecorvino (1615);
- Giovanni dei Gualtieri, Bishop of Sansepolcro (1615);

and the principal co-consecrator of:

- Alberto Drago, Bishop of Termoli (1599);
- Laudivio Zacchia, Bishop of Corneto e Montefiascone (1605);
- Diomede Carafa, Bishop of Tricarico (1605);
- Cornelio Sozomeno, Bishop of Pula (1605);
- Denis Delfino, Bishop of Vicenza (1606);
- Octavius Saraceni, Bishop of Sovana (1606);
- Giacomo Candido (bishop), Bishop of Lacedonia (1606);
- Giulio Sansedoni, Bishop of Grosseto (1606);
- Mario Cossa, Bishop of Montalcino (1607);
- Guido Bentivoglio d'Aragona, Titular Archbishop of Colossae (1607);
- Vincenzo Bonincontro, Bishop of Agrigento (1607);
- Franciscus Manini, Bishop of Novigrad (1607);
- Orazio Maffei, Archbishop of Chieti (1607);
- Anastasio Germonio, Archbishop of Tarentaise (1607);
- Pomponio de Magistris, Bishop of Terracina, Priverno e Sezze (1608);
- Francesco Vendramin, Patriarch of Venice (1608);
- Michelangelo Tonti, Titular Archbishop of Nazareth (1608);
- Filippo Filonardi, Bishop of Aquino (1608);
- Domenico Rivarola, Bishop of Aleria (1608);
- Benedetto Ala, Archbishop of Urbino (1610);
- Luca Semproni, Bishop of Città di Castello (1610); and
- Giovanni Canauli, Bishop of Fossombrone (1610);

Catholic Church titles
Preceded by Carvajal de Simoncelli	Bishop of Sovana; 1596–1606	Succeeded by Octavius Saraceni
Preceded by Ottavio Paravicini	Cardinal-Priest of Sant'Alessio; 1611–1619	Succeeded by Roberto Ubaldini
Preceded by Camillo Borghese	Archbishop of Siena; 1612–1615	Succeeded by Alessandro Petrucci
