= Giulio Dalla Rosa =

17th-century Catholic bishop

Most Reverend Giulio Dalla Rosa
- Bishop of Borgo San Donnino
- Church: Catholic Church
- Diocese: Diocese Borgo San Donnino
- In office: 25 July 1698 – 31 December 1699
- Predecessor: Nicolò Caranza
- Successor: Alessandro Roncovieri

Orders
- Ordination: 6 June 1666
- Consecration: 25 July 1698 by Emmanuel-Theódose de la Tour d'Auvergne de Bouillon

Personal details
- Born: 10 October 1642 Parma, Italy
- Died: 31 December 1699 (age 57) Borgo San Donnino, Italy

Giulio Dalla Rosa or Giulio Della Rosa (10 October 1642 – 31 December 1699) was a Roman Catholic prelate who served as Bishop of Borgo San Donnino from 1698 to 1699.

== Biography ==
Giulio Dalla Rosa was born in Parma, Italy on 10 October 1642 and ordained a priest on 6 June 1666. On 21 July 1698, he was appointed during the papacy of Pope Innocent XII as Bishop of Borgo San Donnino. On 25 July 1698, he was consecrated bishop by Emmanuel-Theódose de la Tour d'Auvergne de Bouillon, Cardinal-Bishop of Porto e Santa Rufina, with Francesco Pannocchieschi d'Elci, Archbishop of Pisa, and Prospero Bottini, Titular Archbishop of Myra, serving as co-consecrators. He served as Bishop of Borgo San Donnino until his death on 31 December 1699.

== External links and additional sources ==
- Cheney, David M. "Diocese of Fidenza". Catholic-Hierarchy.org. (for Chronology of Bishops)
- Chow, Gabriel. "Diocese of Fidenza (Italy)". GCatholic.org. (for Chronology of Bishops)

Catholic Church titles
Preceded by Nicolò Caranza	Bishop of Borgo San Donnino; 1698–1699	Succeeded by Alessandro Roncovieri
