= Mario Cossa =

17th-century Catholic bishop

Most Reverend Mario Cossa
- Bishop of Montalcino
- Church: Catholic Church
- Diocese: Diocese of Montalcino
- In office: 1607–1618
- Predecessor: Camillo Borghese (archbishop)
- Successor: Ippolito Borghese (bishop)

Orders
- Consecration: 29 Apr 1607 by Roberto Francesco Romolo Bellarmino

Personal details
- Born: Siena, Italy
- Died: 1618

Mario Cossa (died 1618) was a Roman Catholic prelate who served as Bishop of Montalcino (1607–1618).

== Biography ==
Mario Cossa was born in Siena, Italy. On 2 Apr 1607, he was appointed during the papacy of Pope Paul V as Bishop of Montalcino. On 29 Apr 1607, he was consecrated bishop by Roberto Francesco Romolo Bellarmino, Cardinal-Priest of San Matteo in Merulana, with Antonio Caetani (iuniore), Archbishop of Capua, and Metello Bichi, Bishop Emeritus of Sovana, serving as co-consecrators. He served as Bishop of Montalcino until his death in 1618.

== External links and additional sources ==
- Cheney, David M. "Diocese of Montalcino". Catholic-Hierarchy.org. (for Chronology of Bishops) ^{[self-published]}
- Chow, Gabriel. "Diocese of Montalcino (Italy)". GCatholic.org. (for Chronology of Bishops) ^{[self-published]}

Catholic Church titles
Preceded by Camillo Borghese (archbishop)	Bishop of Montalcino; 1607–1618	Succeeded by Ippolito Borghese (bishop)
