= Joachim Piccolomini =

Italian Servite tertiary

Blessed Joachim Piccolomini
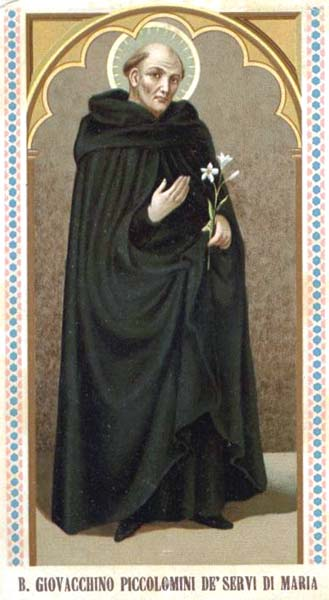
- Joachim Piccolomini depicted on an Italian holy card
- Born: 1258; Siena, Italy
- Died: 10 April 1305 (aged 46–47); Siena, Italy
- Venerated in: Roman Catholic Church
- Beatified: 21 March 1609 by Pope Paul V
- Feast: 16 April; 3 February (Servites?)
- Attributes: Servite holding a book and flower

Joachim Piccolomini (1258 – 10 April 1305), also known as Joachim of Siena, or, in Italian, Giovacchino Piccolomini, was an Italian Servite tertiary from Siena.

== Life ==
Born Chiaramonte Piccolomini, he was from a noble family of Siena, Italy. Especially noted for his devotion to the Blessed Virgin Marym as a child, he would pray the Ave Maria before an image of Our Lady of Sorrows.

He was also known from an early age to exhibit sensitivity to the plight of the poor. He distributed his own clothes and pocket money, and urged his parents to increase their help to the unfortunate.His father once protested to his son, saying that wisdom should set limits to his generosity, otherwise he would lead the whole family into poverty. The compassionate youngster replied modestly: "You have taught me that an alms is given to Jesus Christ in the form of a pauper - can we deny him anything? And what is the benefit of wealth if it is not used to buy treasures in heaven?" The father wept for joy when he found such generous qualities in one who was so young and so dear to him.

Despite his family's reservations, Piccolomini joined the Servites as a lay-brother at the age of fourteen, taking the name Joachim, reflecting his devotion to Mary. He became a spiritual student of Philip Benizi. In the monastery he distinguished himself by his devotion and kindness. On Saturdays, Joachim abstained from all food in honor of the Seven Dolours of the Virgin. His fervor grew, yet instilled in him an extraordinary humility. Joachim was urged by his brothers to study and be ordained a priest, but he felt he was unworthy, and wanted nothing grander than to be an altar server.

One account of Joachim's hagiography has the Blessed Virgin appearing to him at important times in his life, such as in his adolescence, when she urged him to join the Servites. The second time, she appeared with two crowns in her hands; one of rubies to reward him for his compassion in her sorrows, and the other of pearls, in recompense for his virginity, which he had vowed in her honor.

Benizi later sent him to the priory in Arezzo. According to legend Joachim reportedly was unable to console an epileptic, so he begged God that he might take the illness upon himself. On the feast of the Assumption at Arezzo, Joachim was serving as subdeacon when was struck by an epileptic seizure and fell to the floor. When the friars in Siena learned that he was suffering from this disease, they asked the General that he be returned to his native city to be better cared for.

His vita contains marvelous accounts of alleged miracles at this prayerful intercession. Birds frequently permitted him to hold them.

=== Death ===
According to the Legenda of Blessed Joachim of Siena, shortly before his death, Mary once more appeared. Joachim begged her that he would die on the same day on which Jesus Christ had died. The Virgin immediately gratified him, saying, "It is well, prepare thyself; for to-morrow, Good Friday, thou shalt die suddenly as thou desirest—to-morrow thou shalt be with me in heaven." So, during the singing of the Passion according to Saint John, at the words "Now there stood by the cross of Jesus, His Mother" (John 19:25), Joachim fell into his last struggles of death, and at the words "He bowed down his head and expired" (John 19:30), Joachim died. The whole church was filled with an extraordinary light and a sweet-smelling perfume.

== Veneration ==
Piccolomini was declared Venerable by Pope Paul V on 14 April 1609. The cause for his beatification was opened on 12 July 1893, and his spiritual writings were approved by theologians on 23 July 1918. Pope Pius XI beatified him on 9 January 1926.

Piccolomini is commonly depicted as a Servite holding a book and a flower, and is venerated especially in Arezzo and Siena. He is the patron saint against epilepsy.

The oldest biography is attributed to a contemporary of his, Christopher of Parma.
