= Francesco Rinuccini =

17th-century Catholic bishop

Most Reverend Francesco Rinuccini
- Bishop of Pistoia e Prato
- Church: Catholic Church
- Diocese: Diocese of Pistoia
- In office: 1656–1678
- Predecessor: Giovanni Gerini
- Successor: Gherardo Gherardi

Orders
- Consecration: 10 Sep 1656 by Federico Sforza

Personal details
- Born: Florence, Italy
- Died: 11 March 1678

Francesco Rinuccini or Francesco Ruccini (died 1678) was a Roman Catholic prelate who served as Bishop of Pistoia e Prato (1656–1678).

== Biography ==
Francesco Rinuccini was born in Florence, Italy. On 28 Aug 1656, he was appointed during the papacy of Pope Alexander VII as Bishop of Pistoia e Prato. On 10 Sep 1656, he was consecrated bishop by Federico Sforza, Cardinal-Priest of Santi Silvestro e Martino ai Monti, with Annibale Bentivoglio, Titular Archbishop of Thebae, and Luca Torreggiani, Archbishop of Ravenna, serving as co-consecrators. He served as Bishop of Pistoia e Prato until his death on 11 Mar 1678.

While bishop, he was the principal co-consecrator of Celio Piccolomini, Titular Archbishop of Caesarea in Mauretania (1656) .

== External links and additional sources ==
- Cheney, David M. "Diocese of Pistoia". Catholic-Hierarchy.org. (for Chronology of Bishops) ^{[self-published]}
- Chow, Gabriel. "Diocese of Pistoia (Italy)". GCatholic.org. (for Chronology of Bishops) ^{[self-published]}

Catholic Church titles
Preceded by Giovanni Gerini	Bishop of Pistoia e Prato; 1656–1678	Succeeded by Gherardo Gherardi
