= Gioia Dragomani =

Italian Catholic bishop (died 1630)

Most Reverend Gioia Dragomani
- Church: Catholic Church
- Diocese: Diocese of Pienza
- In office: 1599–1630
- Predecessor: Francesco Maria Piccolomini
- Successor: Scipione Pannocchieschi d'Elci
- Previous post: Bishop of Montepeloso (1592–1596)

Personal details
- Died: 26 December 1630

Gioia Dragomani (died 1630) was a Roman Catholic prelate who served as Bishop of Pienza (1599–1630) and Bishop of Montepeloso (1592–1596).

On 27 November 1592, Dragomani was appointed during the papacy of Pope Clement VIII as Bishop of Montepeloso. He resigned from the bishopric in 1596. On 15 December 1599, he was appointed during the papacy of Pope Clement VIII as Bishop of Pienza. He served as Bishop of Pienza until his death on 26 December 1630.

== External links and additional sources ==
- Cheney, David M. "Diocese of Montepeloso". Catholic-Hierarchy.org. (Chronology of Bishops) ^{[self-published]}
- Chow, Gabriel. "Diocese of Irsina (Italy)". GCatholic.org. (Chronology of Bishops) ^{[self-published]}
- Cheney, David M. "Diocese of Pienza". Catholic-Hierarchy.org. (for Chronology of Bishops) ^{[self-published]}
- Chow, Gabriel. "Diocese of Pienza (Italy)". GCatholic.org. (for Chronology of Bishops) ^{[self-published]}

Catholic Church titles
Preceded by Lucio Maranta	Bishop of Montepeloso; 1592–1596	Succeeded by Camillo de Scribani
Preceded by Francesco Maria Piccolomini	Bishop of Pienza; 1599–1630	Succeeded by Scipione Pannocchieschi d'Elci
