= Bonaventura Poerio =

Roman Catholic prelate (1648–1722)

Most Reverend Bonaventura Poerio
- Archbishop of Salerno
- Church: Catholic Church
- Archdiocese: Archdiocese of Salerno
- In office: 1697–1722
- Predecessor: Marcos de Ostos
- Successor: Pablo Vilana Perlas

Orders
- Consecration: 17 November 1697 by Sebastiano Antonio Tanara

Personal details
- Born: 3 February 1648 Taverna, Italy
- Died: 18 November 1722 (aged 74)

Bonaventura Poerio, O.F.M. Obs. (3 February 1648 – 18 November 1722) was a Roman Catholic prelate who served as Archbishop of Salerno (1697–1722).

== Biography ==
Bonaventura Poerio was born on 3 February 1648 in Taverna, Italy and ordained a priest in the Observant branch of the Order of Friars Minor. On 11 November 1697, he was appointed during the papacy of Pope Innocent XII as Archbishop of Salerno. On 17 November 1697, he was consecrated bishop by Sebastiano Antonio Tanara, Cardinal-Priest of Santi Quattro Coronati, with Francesco Pannocchieschi d'Elci, Archbishop of Pisa, and Carlo Loffredo, Archbishop of Bari, serving as co-consecrators. He served as Archbishop of Salerno until his death on 18 November 1722, aged 74.

== External links and additional sources ==
- Cheney, David M. "Archdiocese of Salerno-Campagna-Acerno". Catholic-Hierarchy.org. (for Chronology of Bishops)^{[self-published]}
- Chow, Gabriel. "Metropolitan Archdiocese of Salerno–Campagna–Acerno (Italy)". GCatholic.org. (for Chronology of Bishops)^{[self-published]}

Catholic Church titles
Preceded by Marcos de Ostos	Archbishop of Salerno; 1697–1722	Succeeded by Pablo Vilana Perlas
