= Tommaso della Testa Piccolomini =

Italian Roman Catholic prelate

Most Reverend Tommaso della Testa Piccolomini
- Bishop of Sovana; Bishop of Pienza and Montalcino
- Church: Catholic Church
- Diocese: Diocese of Sovana (1467-1470); Diocese of Pienza and Montalcino (1470-1482)

Personal details
- Died: 1482

Tommaso della Testa Piccolomini (died 1482) was a Roman Catholic prelate who served as Bishop of Sovana and Bishop of Pienza and Montalcino (1470–1482).

== Biography ==
On 20 November 1467, Piccolomini was appointed Bishop of Sovana by Pope Paul II. On 26 October 1470, he was appointed Bishop of Pienza and Montalcino. He served as Bishop of Pienza and Montalcino until his death in 1482.

== Sources ==
- Cappelletti, Giuseppe (1862). Le chiese d'Italia dalla loro origine sino ai nostri giorni (in Italian). Vol. decimosettimo. Venezia: Antonelli.
- Eubel, Conradus, ed. (1914). Hierarchia catholica (in Latin). Vol. Tomus 2 (second ed.). Münster: Libreria Regensbergiana.
- Ughelli, Ferdinando; Coleti, Nicolo (1718). Italia sacra sive de Episcopis Italiae, et insularum adjacentium (in Latin). Vol. Tomus tertius (second ed.). Venice: Apud Sebastianum Coleti.

Catholic Church titles
Preceded by Apollonio Massaini	Bishop of Sovana; 1467–1470	Succeeded by Andreoccio Ghinucci
Preceded by Giovanni Chinugi	Bishop of Pienza and Montalcino; 1462–1470	Succeeded by Agostino Patrizi de Piccolomini
