= Scipione Pannocchieschi d'Elci =

Scipione Pannocchieschi d’Elci
- Cardinal, Archbishop of Pisa
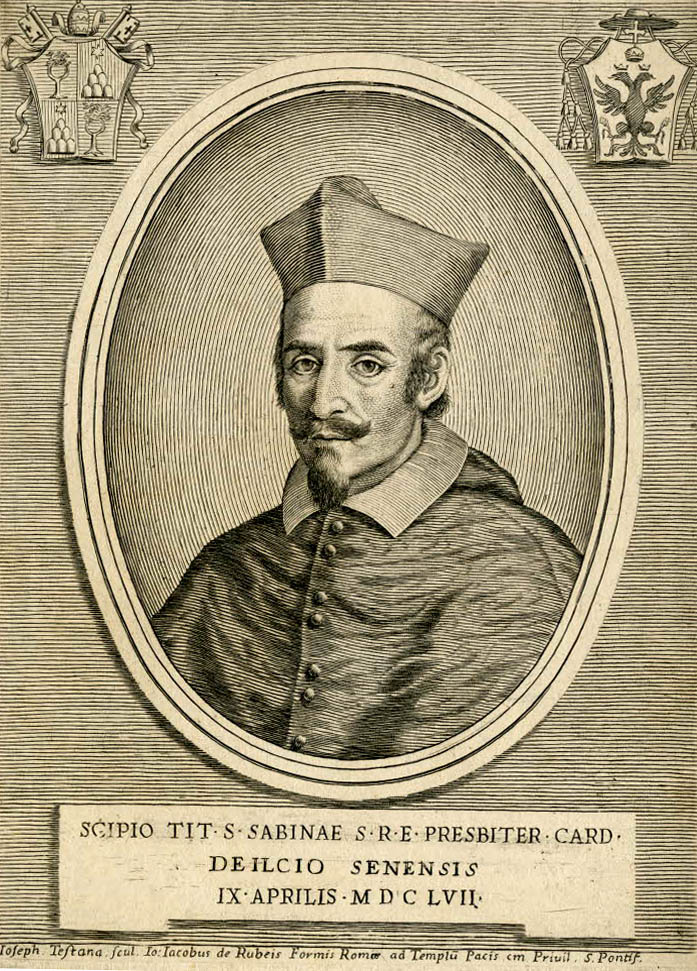
- Church: Catholic Church
- See: Archbishop of Pisa
- Appointed: 3 March 1636
- Term ended: 27 August 1663
- Predecessor: Giuliano de' Medici
- Successor: Francesco Pannocchieschi d’Elci
- Other post: Bishop of Pienza

Orders
- Consecration: 17 August 1631 (Bishop) by Luigi Cardinal Caetani
- Created cardinal: 29 April 1658 by Pope Alexander VII

Personal details
- Born: June 28, 1598 Siena
- Died: April 12, 1670 (aged 71) Rome
- Buried: Basilica di Santa Sabina

Scipione Pannocchieschi d’Elci (28 June 1598 – 12 April 1670) was a Catholic cardinal who served as Apostolic Nuncio to the Republic of Venice and as Archbishop of Pisa.

== Biography ==
Scipione Pannocchieschi d’Elci was born on 28 June 1598 in Siena, sixth son of a noble family. From 1608 to 1618, he followed his father in Spain, where he studied theology in the University of Alcalá. Returned in Tuscany he studied law and was appointed by Archduchess Maria Maddalena of Austria as tutor of her younger sons.

He moved to Rome with his father in 1621 and from 1623, he took up a career in the administration of the Papal States: in 1624 he became referendary of the Tribunals of the Apostolic Signature, from 1627 for one year he was appointed governor of Spoleto, from 1628 for one year he was governor of Ancona and later of Fermo.

Scipione Pannocchieschi d’Elci was ordained priest on 3 May 1629. On 28 July 1631, he was appointed as bishop of Pienza. The Episcopal consecration followed on 17 August in the private chapel of the Barberini in Rome by the hands of Luigi Caetani, Cardinal-Priest of Santa Pudenziana, with Tegrimus Tegrimi, Bishop of Assisi, and Giorgio Bolognetti, Bishop of Ascoli Satriano, serving as co-consecrators. On 3 March 1636, he was promoted Archbishop of Pisa.

Besides the pastoral cure of his diocese, he served Pope Innocent X as diplomat, being Apostolic Nuncio to the Republic of Venice from December 1646 to 1652. He later served as Nuncio to the Holy Roman Empire from 1652 to 1658.

Scipione Pannocchieschi d’Elci was created Cardinal priest on 29 April 1658 with the title of Santa Sabina, having been already appointed cardinal in pectore on 9 April 1657. On 8 June 1658, he was appointed vice-legate of Urbino till 1661. As Archbishop of Pisa, Scipione Pannocchieschi d’Elci held two synods in 1639 and 1659, and visited his diocese two times in 1655 and 1662. He also restored and decorated some churches in the town and completed the works in the seminary using also his own money.

He resigned as archbishop of Pisa in 1663 and moved to Rome, where he died on 12 April 1670 during the conclave of 1669-70, in which he was considered a possible candidate to the papacy. He was buried in the Basilica di Santa Sabina.

Catholic Church titles
Preceded by Gioia Dragomani	Bishop of Pienza; 1631–1666	Succeeded by Ippolito Borghese
Preceded by Giuliano de' Medici	Archbishop of Pisa; 1636–1663	Succeeded by Francesco Pannocchieschi d'Elci
