= Camillo Borghese (archbishop of Siena) =

Roman Catholic prelate

Most Reverend Camillo Borghese
- Archbishop of Siena
- Church: Catholic Church
- Archdiocese: Archdiocese of Siena
- In office: 1607–1612
- Predecessor: François-Marie Tarugi
- Successor: Metello Bichi
- Previous posts: Bishop of Castro di Puglia (1594–1600); Bishop of Montalcino (1600–1607)

Orders
- Consecration: 8 September 1594 by Ottaviano Paravicini

Personal details
- Died: 8 October 1612 Siena, Italy

Camillo Borghese (died 8 October 1612) was a Roman Catholic prelate who served as Archbishop of Siena (1607–1612), Bishop of Montalcino (1600–1607), and Bishop of Castro di Puglia (1594–1600).

== Biography ==
On 5 September 1594, Camillo Borghese was appointed during the papacy of Pope Clement VIII as Bishop of Castro di Puglia. On 8 September 1594, he was consecrated bishop by Ottaviano Paravicini, Bishop of Alessandria della Paglia, with Claude Sozomene, Bishop of Pula, and Giovanni Antonio Viperani, Bishop of Giovinazzo, serving as co-consecrators. On 7 January 1600, he was transferred by Pope Clement VIII to the diocese of Montalcino. On 24 January 1607, he was appointed Archbishop of Siena by his cousin, Pope Paul V (Borghese). He served as Archbishop of Siena until his death on 8 October 1612.

== Sources ==
- Pecci, Giovanni Antonio (1748). Storia del Vescovado della città di Siena (in Italian). Lucca: Marescandoli. pp. 358-359.

Catholic Church titles
Preceded by Mario Farullo	Bishop of Castro di Puglia; 1594–1600	Succeeded by Placido Fava
Preceded by Francesco Maria Piccolomini	Bishop of Montalcino; 1600–1607	Succeeded by Mario Cossa
Preceded by François-Marie Tarugi	Archbishop of Siena; 1607–1612	Succeeded by Metello Bichi
