= Castello Piccolomini (Capestrano) =

- Capestrano
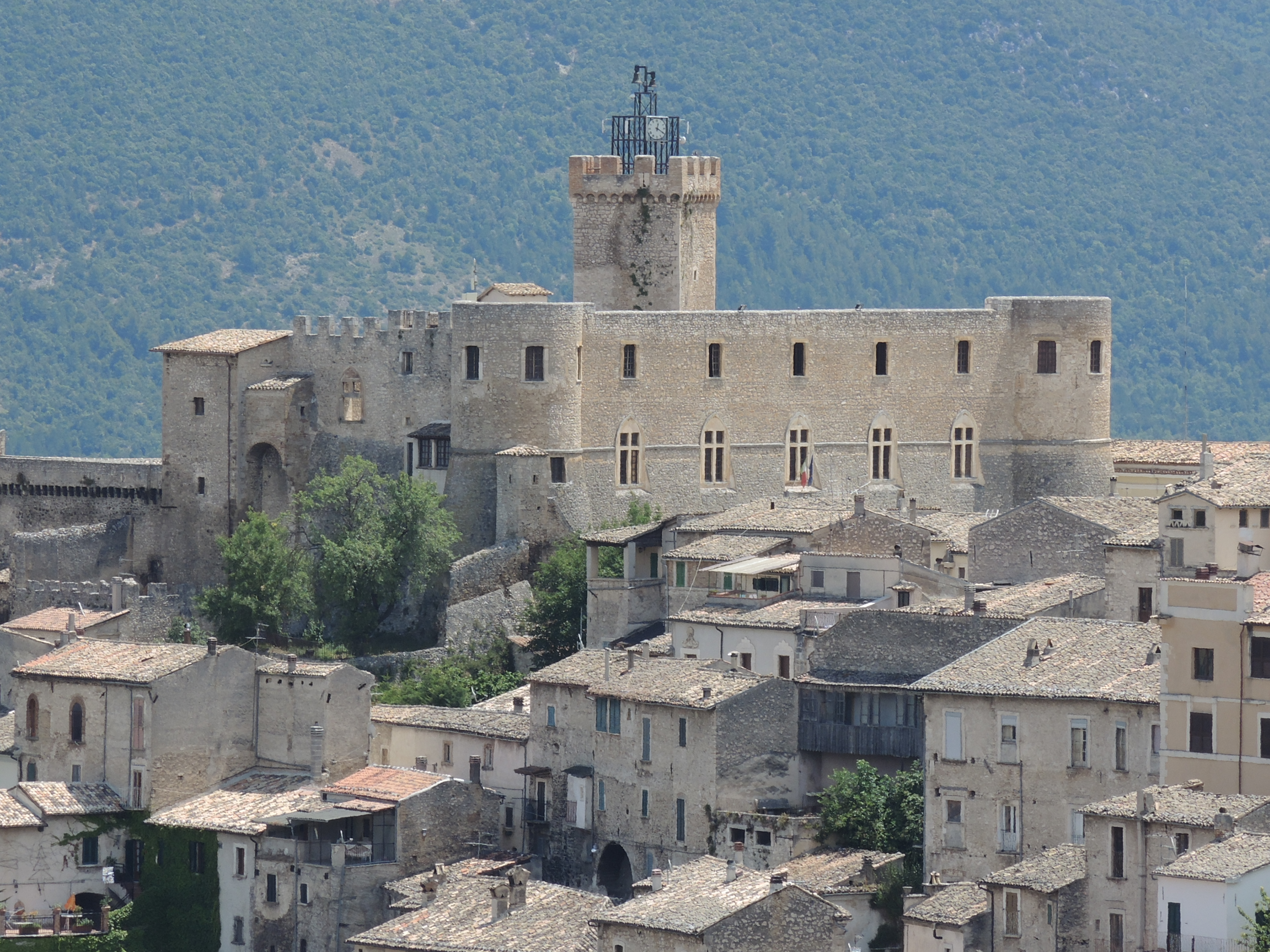
- Castello Piccolomini in Capestrano

Site information
- Type: Castle

Location
- Coordinates: 42.268001°N 13.769348°E

Site history
- Built: 1485

Castello Piccolomini (Italian for Piccolomini castle) is a castle in Capestrano, Province of L'Aquila (Abruzzo).

== History ==
The castle was built replacing a medieval fort, of which remains the central tower. Several families, like Acquaviva, Piccolomini, and Medici, modified the building up to the current structure, completed in 1485.

Now the castle is used as city hall and it was deeply restructured in 1924.

== Architecture ==
The castle is made of two L-shaped structures, of which the larger one, facing south-west, contains the main entrance from the town central square. The internal courtyard, with a well in the middle, has the old medieval tower facing north-east.
