= Giovanni Checconi =

Early modern Catholic bishop

Most Reverend Giovanni Checconi
- Bishop of Pienza
- Church: Catholic Church
- Diocese: Diocese of Pienza
- In office: 1665–1668
- Predecessor: Giacondo Turamini
- Successor: Girolamo Borghese

Orders
- Consecration: 22 November 1665 by Scipione Pannocchieschi d'Elci

Personal details
- Born: Siena, Italy
- Died: 19 March 1668

Giovanni Checconi (died 1668) was a Roman Catholic prelate who served as Bishop of Pienza (1665–1668).

== Biography ==
Giovanni Checconi was born in Siena, Italy. On 11 November 1665, he was appointed during the papacy of Pope Alexander VII as Bishop of Pienza. On 22 November 1665, he was consecrated bishop by Scipione Pannocchieschi d'Elci, Cardinal-Priest of Santa Sabina. He served as Bishop of Pienza until his death on 19 March 1668.

== External links and additional sources ==
- Cheney, David M. "Diocese of Pienza". Catholic-Hierarchy.org. (for Chronology of Bishops) ^{[self-published]}
- Chow, Gabriel. "Diocese of Pienza (Italy)". GCatholic.org. (for Chronology of Bishops) ^{[self-published]}

Catholic Church titles
Preceded by Giacondo Turamini	Bishop of Pienza; 1665–1668	Succeeded by Girolamo Borghese
