= Giovanni Chinugi =

Italian Catholic bishop (died 1470)

Most Reverend Giovanni Chinugi
- Bishop of Pienza e Montalcino
- Church: Catholic Church
- Diocese: Diocese of Pienza e Montalcino
- In office: 1462–1470
- Successor: Tommaso della Testa Piccolomini

Personal details
- Died: 30 September 1470

Giovanni Chinugi (died 1470) was a Roman Catholic prelate who served as Bishop of Pienza e Montalcino (1462–1470) and Bishop of Chiusi (1462).

== Biography ==
On 6 October 1462, Giovanni Chinugi was appointed during the papacy of Pope Pius II as Bishop of Chiusi. The following day, 7 October 1462, he was appointed Bishop of Pienza e Montalcino. He served as Bishop of Pienza e Montalcino until his death on 30 September 1470.

== External links and additional sources ==
- Cheney, David M. "Diocese of Montalcino". Catholic-Hierarchy.org. (for Chronology of Bishops) ^{[self-published]}
- Chow, Gabriel. "Diocese of Montalcino (Italy)". GCatholic.org. (for Chronology of Bishops) ^{[self-published]}
- Cheney, David M. "Diocese of Pienza". Catholic-Hierarchy.org. (for Chronology of Bishops) ^{[self-published]}
- Chow, Gabriel. "Diocese of Pienza (Italy)". GCatholic.org. (for Chronology of Bishops) ^{[self-published]}

Catholic Church titles
Preceded by	Bishop of Chiusi; 1462	Succeeded by Tommaso della Testa Piccolomini
Preceded by	Bishop of Pienza e Montalcino; 1462–1470	Succeeded by Tommaso della Testa Piccolomini
