= Alessandro Piccolomini (bishop of Pienza) =

Roman Catholic prelate

- Bishop of Pienza
- Church: Catholic Church
- Diocese: Pienza
- In office: 1535–1563
- Predecessor: Girolamo Piccolomini (junior)
- Successor: Francesco Maria Piccolomini
- Previous post: Bishop of Montalcino (1528–1554)

Personal details
- Born: c. 1505
- Died: 4 December 1563 (aged c. 58)

Alessandro Piccolomini (c. 1505 – 4 December 1563) was a Roman Catholic prelate who served as Bishop of Pienza (1535–1563) and Bishop of Montalcino (1528–1554).

== Biography ==
On 20 November 1528, Alessandro Piccolomini was appointed during the papacy of Pope Clement VII as Bishop of Montalcino. In 1535, he was appointed during the papacy of Pope Paul III as Bishop of Pienza. In 1554, he resigned as Bishop of Montalcino. He served as Bishop of Pienza until his resignation in December 1563.

While bishop, he was the principal co-consecrator of Francesco Maria Piccolomini, Bishop of Montalcino (1554).

== External links and additional sources ==
- Cheney, David M. "Diocese of Montalcino". Catholic-Hierarchy.org. (for Chronology of Bishops) ^{[self-published]}
- Chow, Gabriel. "Diocese of Montalcino (Italy)". GCatholic.org. (for Chronology of Bishops) ^{[self-published]}
- Cheney, David M. "Diocese of Pienza". Catholic-Hierarchy.org. (for Chronology of Bishops) ^{[self-published]}
- Chow, Gabriel. "Diocese of Pienza (Italy)". GCatholic.org. (for Chronology of Bishops) ^{[self-published]}

Catholic Church titles
Preceded by Girolamo Piccolomini (junior)	Bishop of Montalcino; 1528–1554	Succeeded by Francesco Maria Piccolomini
Preceded by Girolamo Piccolomini (junior)	Bishop of Pienza; 1535–1563	Succeeded by Francesco Maria Piccolomini
