= Roman Catholic Diocese of Montalcino =

The Diocese of Montalcino (Latin: Dioecesis Ilcinensis) was a Roman Catholic diocese located in the town of Montalcino to the west of Pienza, close to the Crete Senesi in Val d'Orcia in Tuscany, Italy. In 1986, it was suppressed and united with the Diocese of Colle di Val d'Elsa and the Archdiocese of Siena to form the Archdiocese of Siena-Colle di Val d'Elsa-Montalcino.

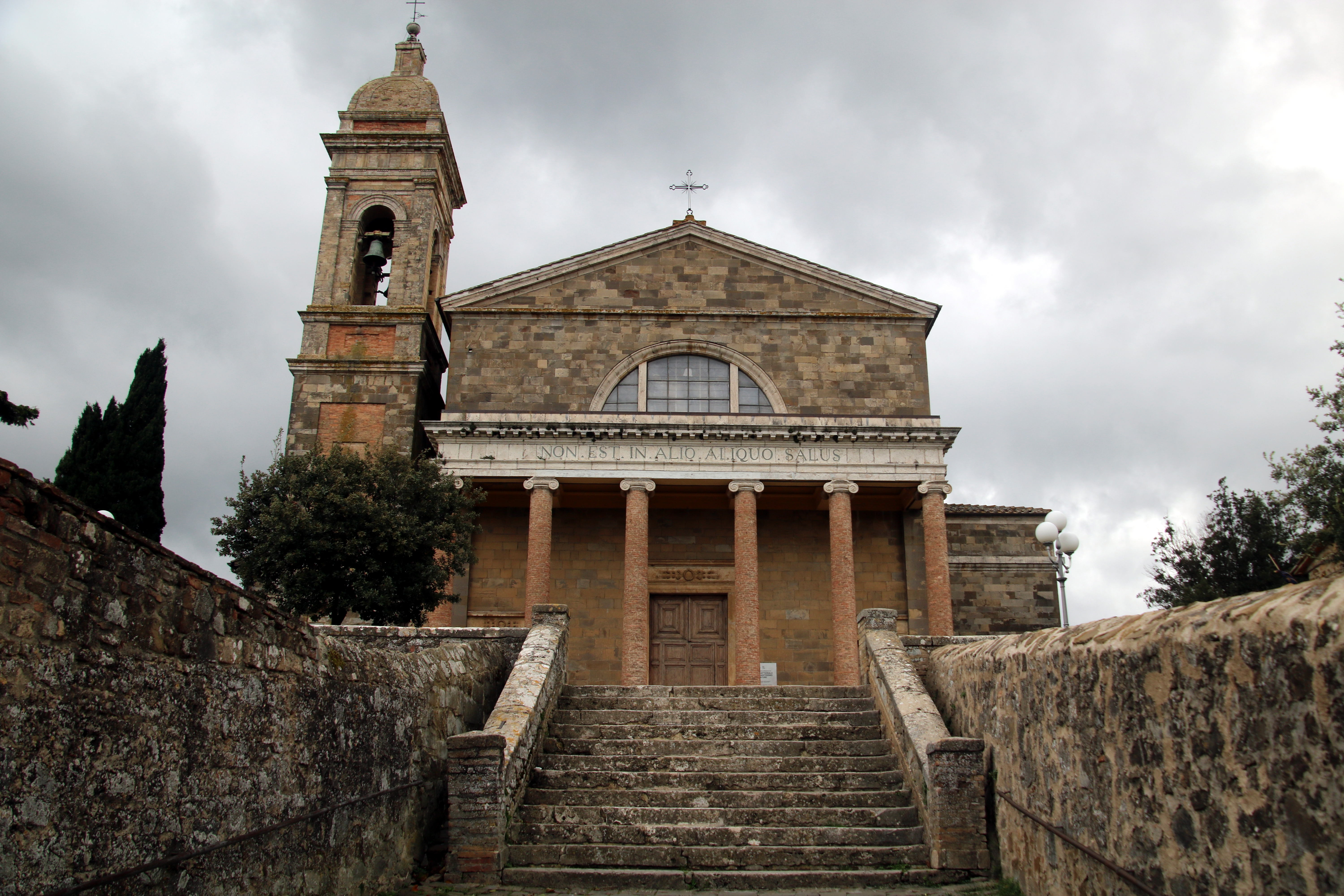
Cocathedral of Santissimo Salvatore

== History ==
=== Establishment of the diocese ===
On 13 August 1462, Pope Pius II established the Diocese of Montalcino, drawing its territory from the Diocese of Arezzo, the Diocese of Chiusi, and the Diocese of Grosseto The new dioceses were removed from all jurisdiction of the metropolitan archbishop of Siena, and made directly subject to the Holy See (Papacy). If a bishop wished, however, he could submit a case to the archbishop, who was authorized to take cognizance of it. The bishop of Pienza and of Montalcino was not obligated to attend the provincial synods of Siena, though he could do so if he wished.

In 1528, Pope Clement VII separated the two dioceses of Montalcino and Pienza into two episcopal jurisdictions with two bishops.

On 15 June 1772, Montalcino gained territory from the Diocese of Chiusi and from the Diocese of Pienza

=== Chapter and cathedral ===
The cathedral was originally a collegiate church, dedicated to the Holy Saviour (San Salvatore)

The cathedral was staffed and administered by a Chapter, composed of four dignities (the Archdeacon, the Archpriest, the Provost, and the Primicerius) and nine Canons. There were in addition four honorary Canons

=== Consolidation ===
The Second Vatican Council, in order to ensure that all Catholics received proper spiritual attention, decreed the reorganization of the diocesan structure of Italy and the consolidation of small and struggling dioceses.

In 1980, the diocese of Montalcino claimed a Catholic population of 24,500 persons. Colle di Val d'Elsa had slightly over 60,000.

On 18 February 1984, the Vatican and the Italian State signed a new and revised concordat. Based on the revisions, a set of Normae was issued on 15 November 1984, which was accompanied in the next year, on 3 June 1985, by enabling legislation. According to the agreement, the practice of having one bishop govern two separate dioceses at the same time, aeque personaliter, was abolished. This made the combining of Montalcino and Colle di Val d'Elsa under one bishop infeasible. Instead, the Vatican continued consultations which had begun under Pope John XXIII for the merging of small dioceses, especially those with personnel and financial problems, into one combined diocese. On 30 September 1986, Pope John Paul II ordered that the dioceses of Montalcino and Colle be merged with the diocese of Siena, into one diocese with one bishop, with the Latin title Archidioecesis Senensis-Collensis-Ilcinensis. The seat of the diocese was to be in Siena, and the cathedral of Siena was to serve as the cathedral of the merged dioceses. The cathedrals in Montalcino and Colle were to become co-cathedrals, and the cathedral Chapters were each to be a Capitulum Concathedralis. There was to be only one diocesan Tribunal, in Siena, and likewise one seminary, one College of Consultors, and one Priests' Council. The territory of the new diocese was to include the territory of the former dioceses of Montalcino and of Colle.

== Bishops of Pienza e Montalcino ==
Erected: 13 August 1462
Latin Name: Pientia et Mons Ilcinus

- Giovanni Chinugi (1462–1470)
- Tommaso della Testa Piccolomini (1470–1482)
- Agostino Patrizi de Piccolomini (1484–1495)

Cardinal Francesco Todeschini-Piccolomini (1495–1498 Resigned) Administrator

- Girolamo Piccolomini (seniore) (14 Mar 1498 – 1510 Resigned)
- Girolamo Piccolomini (iuniore) (9 Dec 1510 – 1535 Died)

== Bishops of Montalcino ==
1528: Split into the Diocese of Montalcino and the Diocese of Pienza
Latin Name: Ilcinensis

- Alessandro Piccolomini (20 Nov 1528 – 1554 Resigned)
- Francesco Maria Piccolomini (20 Apr 1554 – 1599 Died)
- Camillo Borghese (1600–1607)
- Mario Cossa (1607–1618)
- Ippolito Borghese, O.S.B. (1618–1636)
- Scipione Tancredi (1637–1641)
- Alessandro Sergardi (1641–1649)

Sede vacante (1649–1652)

- Antonio Bichi (1652–1656)
- Lorenzo Martinozzi, O.S.B. (16 Oct 1656 – Aug 1663 Died)
- Fabio de Vecchi (14 Jan 1664 – Aug 1688 Resigned)
- Romualdo Tancredi, O.S.B. (9 Aug 1688 – Dec 1694 Died)
- Giuseppe Maria Borgognini (28 Nov 1695 – Nov 1726 Died)
- Bernardino Ciani, O.S.A. (30 Jul 1727 – 9 Aug 1767 Died)
- Domenico Andrea Vegni (14 Dec 1767 – 8 Nov 1773 Died)
- Giuseppe Bernardino Pecci, O.S.B. (27 Jun 1774 – 1809 Died)
- Giacinto Pippi (15 Mar 1815 – 12 Jul 1824 Appointed, Bishop of Chiusi e Pienza)
- Giovanni Bindi Sergardi (20 Dec 1824 – 18 Nov 1843 Died)
- Paolo Giovanni Bertolozzi (7 Jan 1850 – 27 Jan 1867 Died)
- Raffaele Pucci-Sisti (23 Feb 1872 – 30 May 1879 Died)
- Donnino Donnini (19 Sep 1879 – 14 Dec 1891 Appointed, Bishop of Arezzo)
- Amilcare Tonietti (12 Jun 1893 – 25 Sep 1899 Resigned)
- Iader Bertini (18 Sep 1899 – 27 Sep 1908 Died)
- Alfredo del Tomba (29 Apr 1909 – 10 Jul 1937 Resigned)
- Ireneo Enrico Chelucci (22 Jul 1938 – 8 Jun 1970 Died)
- Ismaele Mario Castellano, O.P. (19 Jan 1978 – 30 Sep 1986 Appointed, Archbishop of Siena-Colle di Val d'Elsa-Montalcino)

30 September 1986: Suppressed, and incorporated in the Archdiocese of Siena-Colle di Val d'Elsa-Montalcino

== See also ==
- Catholic Church in Italy
- List of Catholic dioceses in Italy

== Books ==
- Gams, Pius Bonifatius (1873). Series episcoporum Ecclesiae catholicae: quotquot innotuerunt a beato Petro apostolo. Ratisbon: Typis et Sumptibus Georgii Josephi Manz. pp. 743–744. (Use with caution; obsolete)
- Eubel, Conradus, ed. (1913). Hierarchia catholica (in Latin). Vol. Tomus 1 (second ed.). Münster: Libreria Regensbergiana.
- Eubel, Conradus, ed. (1914). Hierarchia catholica (in Latin). Vol. Tomus 2 (second ed.). Münster: Libreria Regensbergiana.
- Eubel, Conradus; Gulik, Guilelmus, eds. (1923). Hierarchia catholica (in Latin). Vol. Tomus 3 (second ed.). Münster: Libreria Regensbergiana.
- Gauchat, Patritius (Patrice) (1935). Hierarchia catholica (in Latin). Vol. Tomus IV (1592-1667). Münster: Libraria Regensbergiana.
- Ritzler, Remigius; Sefrin, Pirminus (1952). Hierarchia catholica medii et recentis aevi (in Latin). Vol. Tomus V (1667-1730). Patavii: Messagero di S. Antonio.
- Ritzler, Remigius; Sefrin, Pirminus (1958). Hierarchia catholica medii et recentis aevi. Vol. Tomus VI (1730-1799). Patavii: Messagero di S. Antonio.
- Ritzler, Remigius; Sefrin, Pirminus (1968). Hierarchia Catholica medii et recentioris aevi (in Latin). Vol. VII (1800–1846). Monasterii: Libreria Regensburgiana.
- Remigius Ritzler; Pirminus Sefrin (1978). Hierarchia catholica Medii et recentioris aevi (in Latin). Vol. VIII (1846–1903). Il Messaggero di S. Antonio.
- Pięta, Zenon (2002). Hierarchia catholica medii et recentioris aevi (in Latin). Vol. IX (1903–1922). Padua: Messagero di San Antonio. ISBN 978-88-250-1000-8.

=== Studies ===
- Bocchini Camianai, Bruna (1992). "I vescovi toscani nel periodo lorenese," in: Istituzioni e società in Toscana nell’età moderna. Atti delle giornate di studio dedicate a Giuseppe Pansini (Firenze, 4–5 dicembre 1992). Roma: Ministero per i beni culturali. Ufficio centrale per i beni archivistici, 1992. pp. 681–715.
- Cappelletti, Giuseppe (1864). Le chiese d'Italia dalla loro origine sino ai nostri giorni (in Italian). Vol. decimoottavo. Venezia: Antonelli. pp. 441–471.
- Repetti, Emanuele (1839). Dizionario geografico, fisico, storico della Toscana: contenente la descrizione di tutti i luoghi del granducato, ducato di Lucca, Garfagnana e Lunigiana (in Italian). Vol. terzo. Firenze: Presso l'autore e editore.
- Ughelli, Ferdinando; Coleti, Niccolò (1717). Italia sacra sive De Episcopis Italiae (in Latin). Vol. Tomus primus (1) (Second ed.). Venice: apud Sebastianum Coleti. pp. 991–998.
