= Girolamo Piccolomini (senior) =

Most Reverend Girolamo Piccolomini
- Bishop of Pienza and Bishop of Montalcino
- Church: Catholic Church
- Diocese: Diocese of Pienza; Diocese of Montalcino
- In office: 1498–1510
- Predecessor: Francesco Todeschini-Piccolomini
- Successor: Girolamo Piccolomini (junior)
- Previous post: Bishop of Montalcino (1498–1510)

Girolamo Piccolomini, seniore was a Roman Catholic prelate who served as Bishop of Pienza (1498–1510) and Bishop of Montalcino (1498–1510).

== Biography ==
On 14 March 1498, Girolamo Piccolomini was appointed during the papacy of Pope Alexander VI as both Bishop of Pienza and Bishop of Montalcino. He served as Bishop of Pienza and Bishop of Montalcino until his resignation in favor of his son of the same name, Girolamo Piccolomini (junior), on 9 Dec 1510.

== External links and additional sources ==
- Cheney, David M. "Diocese of Montalcino". Catholic-Hierarchy.org. (for Chronology of Bishops) ^{[self-published]}
- Chow, Gabriel. "Diocese of Montalcino (Italy)". GCatholic.org. (for Chronology of Bishops) ^{[self-published]}
- Cheney, David M. "Diocese of Pienza". Catholic-Hierarchy.org. (for Chronology of Bishops) ^{[self-published]}
- Chow, Gabriel. "Diocese of Pienza (Italy)". GCatholic.org. (for Chronology of Bishops) ^{[self-published]}

Catholic Church titles
Preceded by Francesco Todeschini-Piccolomini	Bishop of Pienza; 1498–1510	Succeeded by Girolamo Piccolomini (junior)
Preceded by Francesco Todeschini-Piccolomini	Bishop of Montalcino; 1498–1510	Succeeded by Girolamo Piccolomini (junior)
