= Girolamo Piccolomini (junior) =

Bishop of Pienza and Montalcino

Most Reverend Girolamo Piccolomini
- Bishop of Pienza
- Church: Catholic Church
- Diocese: Roman Catholic Diocese of Pienza
- In office: 1510–1535
- Predecessor: Girolamo Piccolomini (senior)
- Successor: Alessandro Piccolomini
- Previous post: Bishop of Montalcino (1510–1528)

Personal details
- Died: 1535 Pienza, Italy

Girolamo Piccolomini (died 1535) was a Roman Catholic prelate who served as Bishop of Pienza (1510–1535) and Bishop of Montalcino (1510–1528).

== Biography ==
On 9 December 1510, Girolamo Piccolomini was appointed during the papacy of Pope Julius II as both Bishop of Pienza and Bishop of Montalcino, replacing his father of the same name. He served as Bishop of Montalcino until his resignation on 20 November 1528. He served as Bishop of Pienza until his death in 1535.

== External links and additional sources ==
- Cheney, David M. "Diocese of Montalcino". Catholic-Hierarchy.org. (for Chronology of Bishops) ^{[self-published]}
- Chow, Gabriel. "Diocese of Montalcino (Italy)". GCatholic.org. (for Chronology of Bishops) ^{[self-published]}
- Cheney, David M. "Diocese of Pienza". Catholic-Hierarchy.org. (for Chronology of Bishops) ^{[self-published]}
- Chow, Gabriel. "Diocese of Pienza (Italy)". GCatholic.org. (for Chronology of Bishops) ^{[self-published]}

Catholic Church titles
Preceded by Girolamo Piccolomini (senior)	Bishop of Montalcino; 1510–1528	Succeeded by Alessandro Piccolomini
Preceded by Girolamo Piccolomini (senior)	Bishop of Pienza; 1510–1535	Succeeded by Alessandro Piccolomini
