= Castello Piccolomini (Celano) =

- Celano
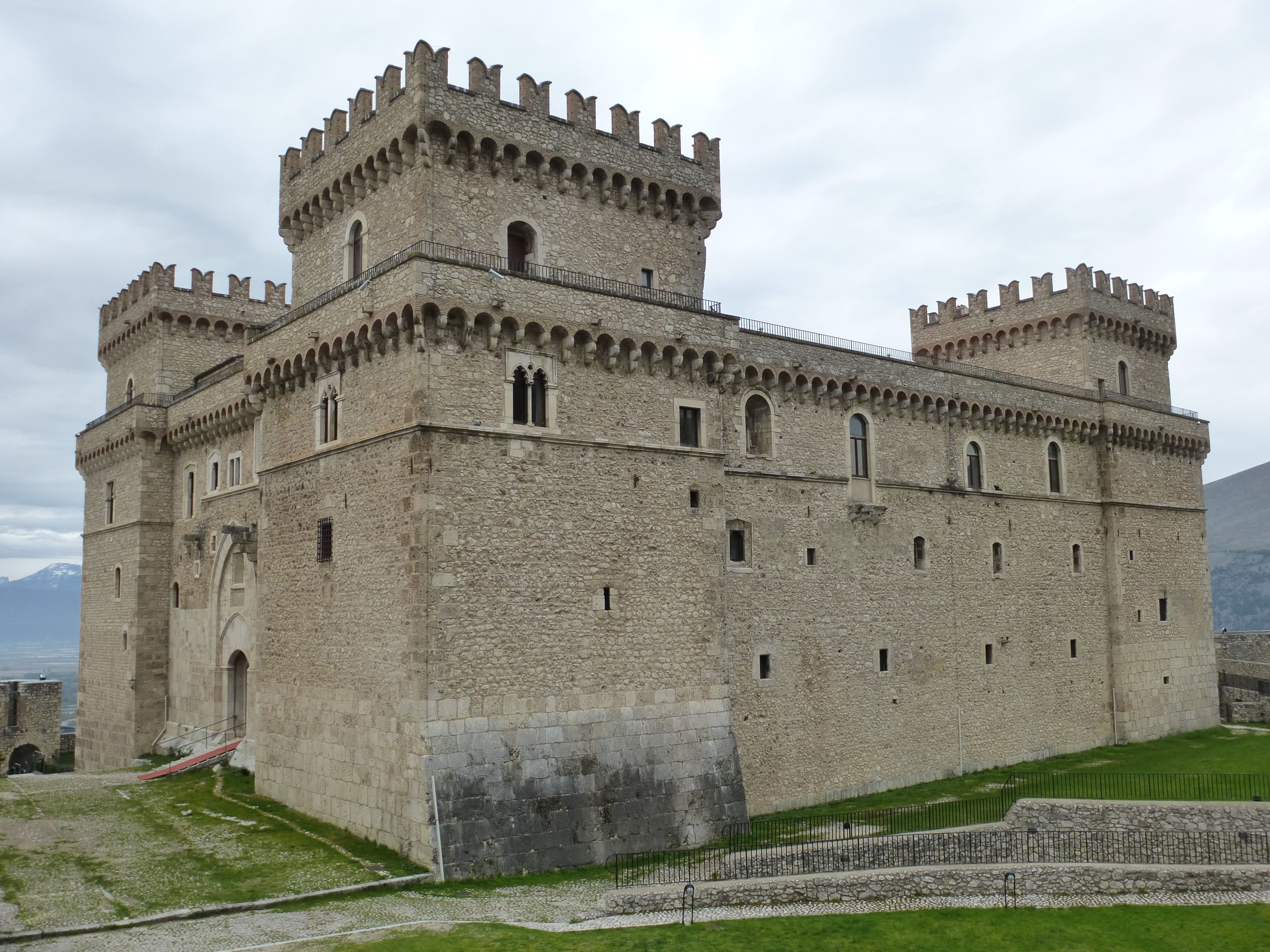
- Castello Piccolomini in Celano

Site information
- Type: Castle

Location
- Location within Italy
- Coordinates: 42.084626°N 13.545257°E

Site history
- Built: 1451

Castello Piccolomini (Italian for Piccolomini castle) is a castle in Celano, Province of L'Aquila (Abruzzo).

== History ==
The building of the castle took place in several stages. In 1392 Pietro De' Berardi built the walls of the castle and the first two floors of the building. In 1451 Leonello Acclozamora built the main floor and the four towers at the corners. In 1463 Antonio Todeschini Piccolomini completed the building as seen today, with an open gallery in the second floor of the courtyard and improvements in the walls around the castle.

The following families succeeded in the castle (like Sforza-Cesarini and Dragonetti) didn't change further the structure of the building. A deep restoration took place since 1940, put on hold during World War II, restarted in 1955 and completed in 1960. Now the building is used as offices for the Ministry of Cultural Heritage and Activities, in addition to a museum of sacred arts.

== Architecture ==
The main building has a rectangular plan, with the longest sides facing north and south. The internal courtyard hosts a well and it is surrounded by a colonnade.

The building is protected by irregular walls with several towers, part of them with a squared plan, and other ones trunk-conical shaped.
