= Roman Catholic Diocese of Pienza =

The Diocese of Pienza (Latin: Dioecesis Pientinus) was a Roman Catholic diocese located in the town of Pienza in the province of Siena, in the Val d'Orcia in Tuscany between the towns of Montepulciano (fifteen km distant) and Montalcino. Until 1462, the town was known as Corsignano. It took the name Pienza from its most famous native son, Pope Pius II (Aeneas Silvius Piccolomini), who elevated the town to the status of a city (civitas), and established the new diocese. The diocese existed as an independent entity from 1462 to 1772, directly subject to the Holy See (Papacy).

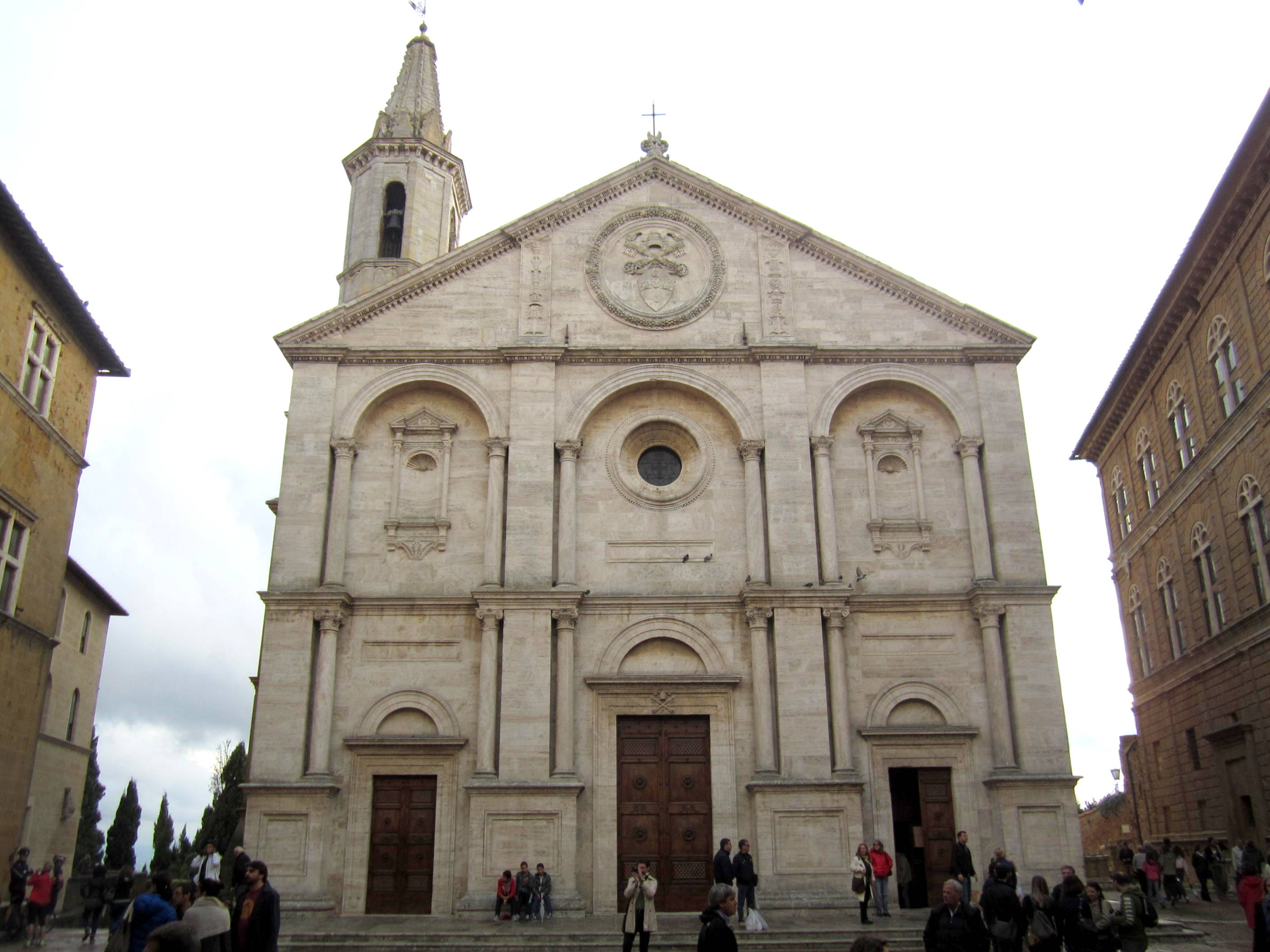
Duomo of Pienza

== History ==
The architect chosen to carry out Pius II's plans to construct Pienza was Bernardo Rossellino. The change in name of Corsignano was carried out by the Senate of Siena, at the suggestion of Pope Pius, on 1 June 1462. On 29 August 1462, the Feast of the cutting off (decollazione) of the head of John the Baptist, the completed cathedral was dedicated by Cardinal Guillaume d'Estouteville, Bishop of Ostia, though the Pope personally dedicated the high altar. The cathedral was named the Cathedral of the taking up of the body (Assumption) of the Virgin Mary into heaven. The edifice was damaged by the large earthquake of 26 November 1545, and the apse began to subside, a problem which persists to the present day.

In April 1473, Bishop Tommaso della Testa Piccolomini presided over the first diocesan synod held in Pienza.

On 23 May 1594, Pope Clement VIII separated the two dioceses of Pienza and Montalcino.

On 15 June 1772, in the bull "Quemadmodum", Pope Clement XIV united the dioceses of Chiusi and Pienza.

== Bishops ==
=== Diocese of Pienza e Montalcino ===
Erected: 13 August 1462
Latin Name: Pientia et Mons Ilcinus

- Giovanni Chinugi (1462–1470)
- Tommaso della Testa Piccolomini (26 Oct 1470 – 1482 Died)
- Agostino Patrizi de Piccolomini (19 Jan 1484 – 1495 Died)
- Francesco Todeschini-Piccolomini (31 Oct 1495 – Mar 1498 Resigned)
- Girolamo Piccolomini (seniore) (14 Mar 1498 – 1510 Resigned)
- Girolamo Piccolomini (iuniore) (9 Dec 1510 – 1535 Died)

=== Diocese of Pienza ===
1528: Split into the Diocese of Pienza and the Diocese of Montalcino
Latin Name: Pientinus

- Alessandro Piccolomini (1535 – Dec 1563 Resigned)
- Francesco Maria Piccolomini (Dec 1563 – 1599 Died)
- Gioia Dragomani (15 Dec 1599 – 26 Dec 1630 Died)
- Scipione Pannocchieschi d'Elci (28 Jul 1631 – 3 Mar 1636 Appointed, Archbishop of Pisa)
- Ippolito Borghese (bishop), O.S.B. (1 Sep 1636 – Mar 1637 Died)
- Giovanni Spennazzi (5 Oct 1637 – 11 Aug 1658 Died)
- Giacondo Turamini (31 Mar 1664 – 17 Jan 1665 Died)
- Giovanni Checconi (11 Nov 1665 – 19 Mar 1668 Died)
- Girolamo Borghese, O.S.B. (17 Dec 1668 – 15 Jan 1698 Died)
- Antonio Forteguerra, O.S.B. (15 Sep 1698 – Jan 1714 Died)
- Ascanio Silvestri (13 Jun 1714 – Nov 1724 Died)
- Cinugo Settimio Cinughi (18 Apr 1725 – Mar 1740 Died)
- Francesco Maria Piccolomini (iuniore) (3 Jul 1741 – 27 Jan 1772 Resigned)

15 June 1772: United with the Diocese of Chiusi to form the Diocese of Chiusi e Pienza

== See also ==
- Catholic Church in Italy

== Books ==
- Gams, Pius Bonifatius (1873). Series episcoporum Ecclesiae catholicae: quotquot innotuerunt a beato Petro apostolo. Ratisbon: Typis et Sumptibus Georgii Josephi Manz. pp. 743–744, 754.
- Eubel, Conradus, ed. (1914). Hierarchia catholica (in Latin). Vol. Tomus 2 (second ed.). Münster: Libreria Regensbergiana.
- Gulik, Guilelmus (1923). Eubel, Conradus (ed.). Hierarchia catholica (in Latin). Vol. Tomus 3 (second ed.). Münster: Libreria Regensbergiana.
- Gauchat, Patritius (Patrice) (1935). Hierarchia catholica (in Latin). Vol. Tomus IV (1592-1667). Münster: Libraria Regensbergiana.
- Ritzler, Remigius; Sefrin, Pirminus (1952). Hierarchia catholica medii et recentis aevi (in Latin). Vol. Tomus V (1667-1730). Patavii: Messagero di S. Antonio.
- Ritzler, Remigius; Sefrin, Pirminus (1958). Hierarchia catholica medii et recentis aevi. Vol. Tomus VI (1730-1799). Patavii: Messagero di S. Antonio.
- Ritzler, Remigius; Sefrin, Pirminus (1968). Hierarchia Catholica medii et recentioris aevi (in Latin). Vol. VII (1800–1846). Monasterii: Libreria Regensburgiana.
- Remigius Ritzler; Pirminus Sefrin (1978). Hierarchia catholica Medii et recentioris aevi (in Latin). Vol. VIII (1846–1903). Il Messaggero di S. Antonio.
- Pięta, Zenon (2002). Hierarchia catholica medii et recentioris aevi (in Latin). Vol. IX (1903–1922). Padua: Messagero di San Antonio. ISBN 978-88-250-1000-8.

=== Studies ===
- Cappelletti, Giuseppe (1864). Le chiese d'Italia (in Italian). Vol. decimotto (18). Venezia: G. Antonelli. pp. 604–632.
- Chironi, Giuseppe (2003), "Pius II and the Formation of the Ecclesiastical Institutions of Pienza," in: Z.R.W.M. von Martels, Arjo J. Vanderjagt (edd.), Pius II — 'El Pìu Expeditivo Pontifice': Selected Studies on Aeneas Silvius Piccolomini (1405-1464) (Leiden-Boston: Brill 2003), pp. 171–185.
- Greco, G. (1990), 'La diocesi di Pienza tra XVII e XVIII secolo', in: A. Cortonesi (ed.), La Val d'Orcia nel medioevo e nei primi secoli dell' eta moderna (Rome 1990), pp. 447–490. (in Italian)
- Mack, Charles Randall (1987). Pienza: The Creation of a Renaissance City. Ithaca: Cornell University Press. ISBN 978-1-5017-4604-8.
- Mannucci, Giovanni Battista (1915). Pienza: i suoi monumenti e la sua diocesi (in Italian). Montepulciano: Madonna della Querce.
- Ughelli, Ferdinando; Coleti, Nicolò (1717). Italia sacra: sive De episcopis Italiae et insularum adjacentium, rebusque abiis praeclare gestis... (in Latin). Vol. Tomus primus (secunda ed.). Venice: apud Sebastianum Coleti. pp. 1174–1180.
