= Armentarius of Pavia =

Italian Roman Catholic saint

Saint Armentarius

Bishop of Pavia
- Died: 732
- Venerated in: Roman Catholic Church, Orthodox Church
- Canonized: Pre-congregation
- Feast: 30 January

Armentarius of Pavia was Bishop of Pavia from 711 to 732.

Armentarius succeeded Bishop Damian. During his episcopacy, he had an ongoing dispute with Benedict, Bishop of Milan, who insisted that Pavia was historically under the Metropolitan See of Milan, while Armentarius maintained that Pavia was directly subject to Rome. Pope Constantine sided with Armentarius, perhaps because Pavia was the capital of the Kingdom of the Lombards.

His tomb in Pavia Cathedral became a site of pilgrimages, due to his reputation as a powerful intercessor. He is commemorated on January 30.

The transfer of Augustine of Hippo's remains from Sardinia to San Pietro in Ciel d'Oro, although sometimes attributed to Armentarius, probably occurred during the tenure of his successor, Peter, uncle of King Liutprand.
