= Ampelius =

Ampelius may refer to:

- Lucius Ampelius, 3rd-century author of the Liber Memorialis
- Ampelius (bishop of Milan) (fl. 7th century)
