= Saint Crispin =

Saint Crispin may refer to:

- Saint Crispin (3rd century), martyrs (memorial: 25 October)
- Crispin of Pavia (5th century), bishop (7 January)
- Crispin of Viterbo (1668–1750), Capuchin (19 May)
