= Ticinum =

Ancient Italian city

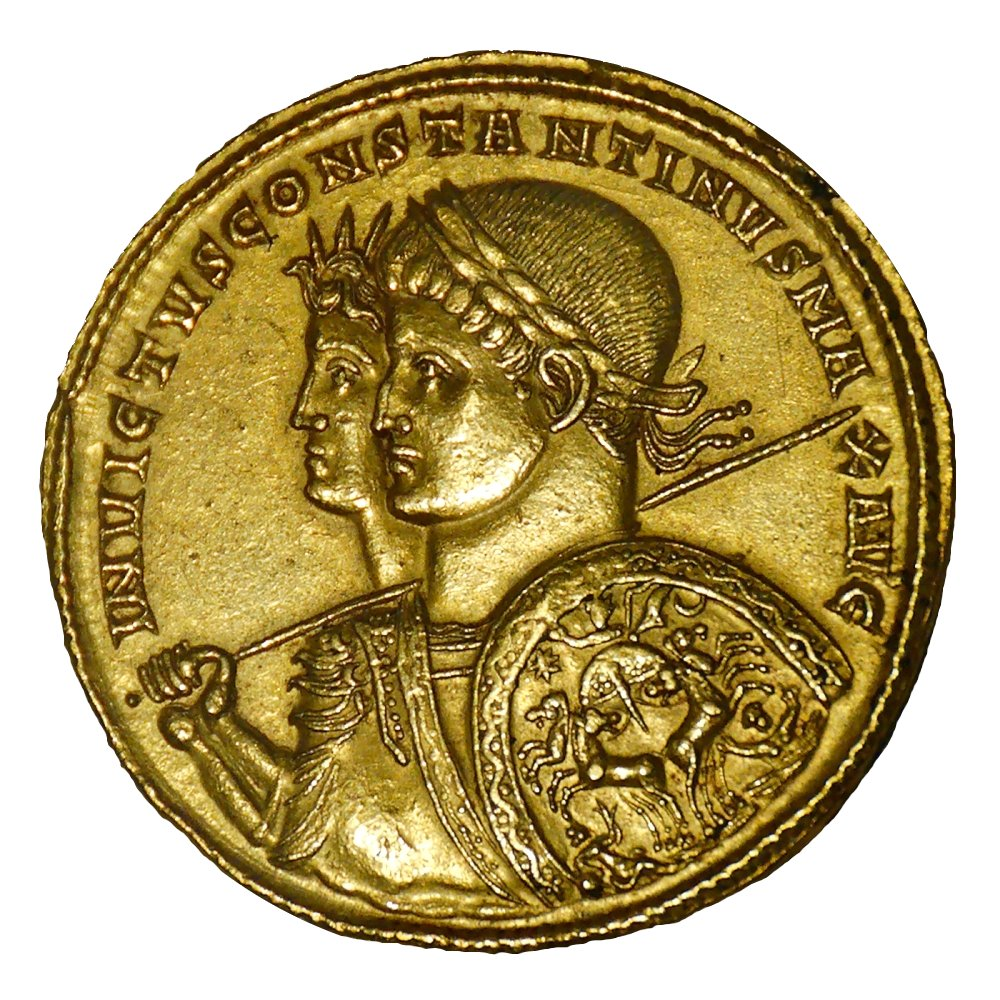
Gold multiple of Constantine, minted in Ticinum, 313

Ticinum (the modern Pavia) was an ancient city of Gallia Transpadana, founded on the banks of the river of the same name (now the Ticino) a little way above its confluence with the Padus (Po).

It was said by Pliny the Elder to have been founded by the Laevi and Marici, two Ligurian tribes, while Ptolemy attributes it to the Insubres. Its importance in Roman times was due to the extension of the Via Aemilia from Ariminum (Rimini) to the Padus (or Po) (187 BC), which it crossed at Placentia (Piacenza) and there forked, one branch going to Mediolanum (Milan) and the other to Ticinum, and thence to Laumellum where it divided once more, one branch going to Vercellae, and thence to Eporedia and Augusta Praetoria; and the other to Valentia, and thence to Augusta Taurinorum (Turin) or to Pollentia.

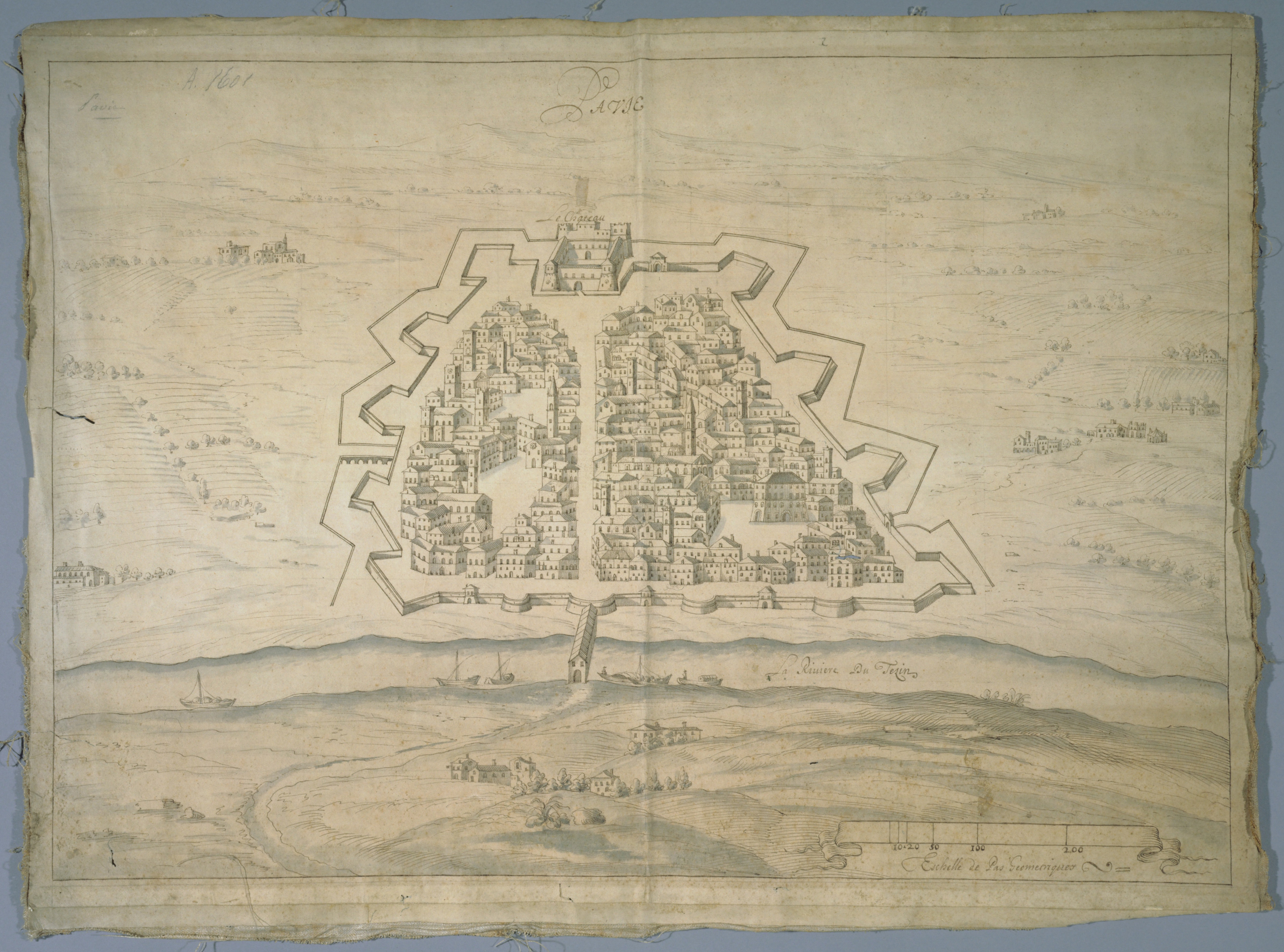
17th-century drawing of the street layout and fortifications of the town of Pavia

The branch to Eporedia must have been constructed before 100 BC. Ticinum is frequently mentioned by classical writers. It was a municipium, but we learn little of it except that in the 4th century there was a manufacturer of bows and a mint there. The first Christian bishops of the city are identified as Juventius and Syrus.

In 271 the Emperor Aurelian defeated a retreating army of Juthungi at the Battle of Ticinum. Ticinum was the site of a mint, transferred from Mediolanum by Aurelian in 275, which remained active until closed by Constantine the Great in 326.

The city was pillaged by Attila in 452 and by Odoacer in 476, but rose to importance as a military centre in the Gothic period. At Dertona and here the grain stores of Liguria were placed, and Theodoric the Great constructed a palace, baths and amphitheatre and new town walls; while an inscription of Athalaric relating to repairs of seats in the amphitheatre is preserved (529). Boethius wrote De consolatione philosophiae while imprisoned at Ticinum before his execution in late 525 or early 526. From this point, too, navigation on the Padus seems to have begun. Narses recovered it for the Eastern Empire, but after a long siege, the garrison had to surrender to the Lombards in 572.

Saint Damian of Pavia was bishop of the city from 680 to 710.

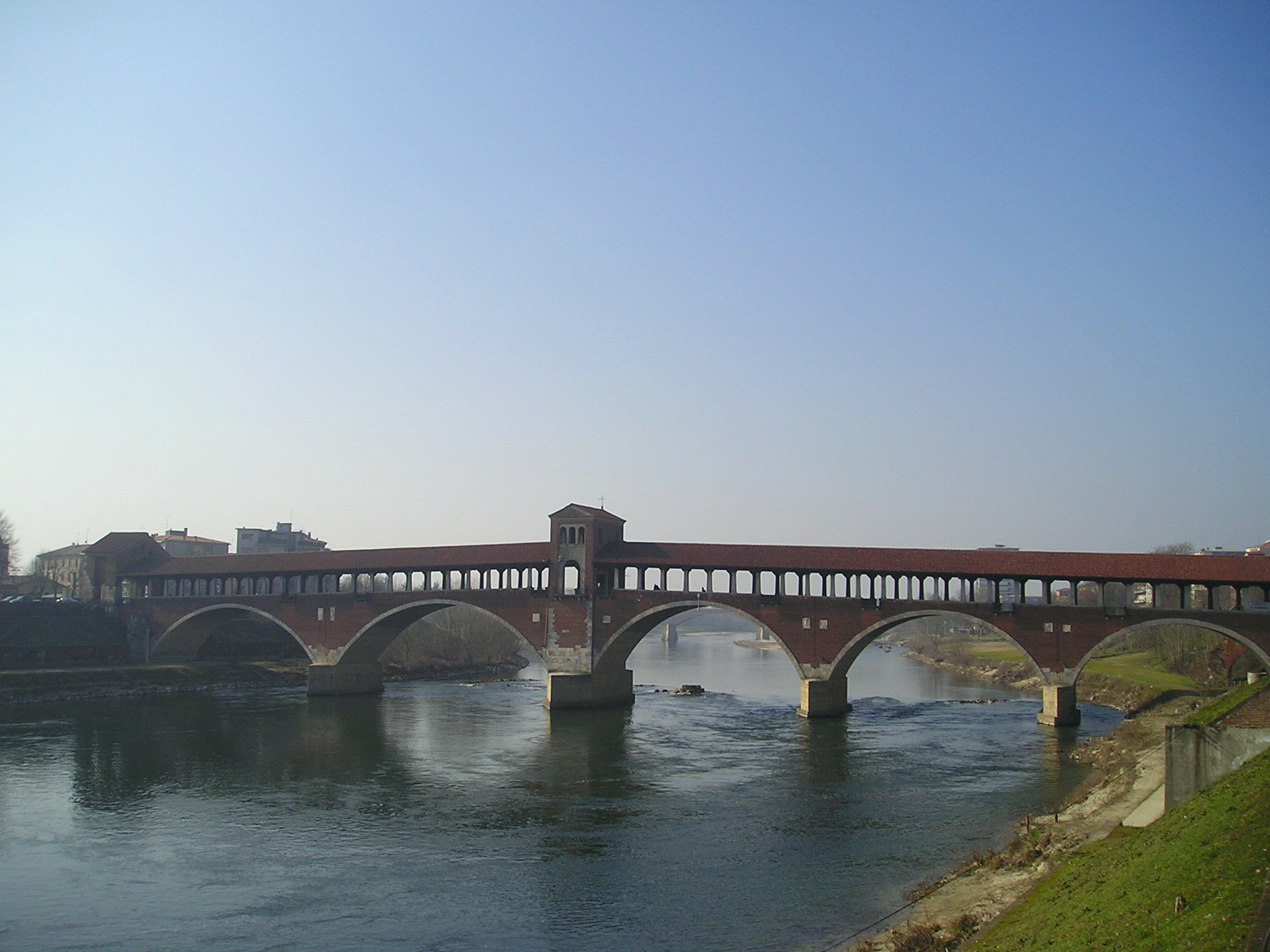
The Ponte Vecchio (old bridge) in Pavia

The name Papia, from which the modern name Pavia comes, does not appear until Lombard times, when it became the seat of the Lombard kingdom, and as such one of the leading cities of Italy. Cornelius Nepos, the biographer, appears to have been a native of Ticinum. Of Roman remains little is preserved; there is, for example, no sufficient proof that the cathedral rests upon an ancient temple of Cybele though the regular ground plan of the central portion, a square of some 1150 yards, betrays its Roman origin, and it may have sprung from a military camp. This is not unnatural, for Pavia was never totally destroyed; even the fire of 1004 can only have damaged parts of the city, and the plan of Pavia remained as it was. Its gates were possibly preserved until early in the 8th century.

The picturesque covered bridge, the Ponte Coperto or Ponte Vecchio, which joins Pavia to the suburb on the right bank of the river, was preceded by a Roman bridge, of which only one pillar, in blocks of granite from the Baveno quarries, exists under the remains of the central arch of the medieval bridge, the rest having no doubt served as material for the latter. The medieval bridge dates from 1351 to 1354. It was destroyed by bombing in the Second World War and subsequently rebuilt in a similar shape and position.
