= Anastasius of Pavia =

Italian Roman Catholic saint

Saint Anastasius

Bishop of Pavia
- Died: 680
- Venerated in: Roman Catholic Church
- Canonized: Pre-congregation
- Feast: 30 May

Anastasius of Pavia (sometimes Anastasius XV, or Anastasius II) was Bishop of Pavia (Ticinum) from 668 until his death in 680. He was a convert from Arianism. He was succeeded by Damian of Pavia.
