= Mansuetus =

The male first name Mansuetus may refer to one of the following saints:

- Mansuetus of Toul, bishop of Toul in the 4th century
- Mansuetus of Milan, bishop of Milan in the 7th century
