= Peter of Pavia (disambiguation) =

Peter of Pavia (died 1182) was a Roman Catholic cardinal from 1173 until his death.

Peter or Pietro was also the name of several bishops of Pavia:

- Peter I (died 735)
- Peter II (died 790)
- Peter III Canepanova (972–983), became Pope John XIV
- Peter IV il Rosso (died 1139)
- Pietro Toscani (died 1180)
- Pietro Spelta (died 1356)
- Pietro Grassi (died 1426)
- Pietro Maria Ferrè (1859–1867)
