= Melzi (disambiguation) =

Melzi was a civitas (town) of the Roman Empire during late antiquity. Melzi may also refer to:

- Francesco Melzi, or Francesco de Melzi (1491–1570), Italian painter born into a family of the Milanese nobility in Lombardy
- Girolamo Melzi (1599–1672), Italian Roman Catholic Bishop of Pavia
- Francesco Melzi d'Eril, Duke of Lodi, Count of Magenta (1753-1816), Italian politician and patriot
- Jose de Palafox y Melzi (1776-1847), Spanish general who fought in the Peninsular War
- Palazzo Melzi d'Eril, Milan, a neoclassical-style palace located in Milan, region of Lombardy, Italy

== See also ==
- Villa Melzi d'Eril, several places
