= July 7 (Eastern Orthodox liturgics) =

Day in the Eastern Orthodox liturgical calendar

Eastern Orthodox liturgical calendar
July 6	July 7	July 8
July 7 O.S. ≍ July 20 N.S. July 7 N.S ≍ June 24 O.S.

An Eastern Orthodox cross

July 7 in Eastern Orthodox liturgical calendars is a feast day and a day of commemoration of saints and martyrs. Although some Orthodox churches use the Revised Julian Calendar and others use the traditional Julian calendar, the fixed commemorations for their respective July 7 are broadly the same, no matter which calendar is used. (Note: Despite the dates being the same, the days to which they refer typically differ by 13 days. The notation Old Style or O.S. is sometimes used to indicate a date in the traditional Julian Calendar (the "Old Calendar"). The notation New Style or N.S. indicates a date in the Revised Julian calendar (the "New Calendar").)

== Saints ==
- Martyrs Peregrinus, Lucian, Pompeius, Hesychius, Pappias, Saturninus, and Germanus, of Dyrrachium in Macedonia (2nd century) (Note: "At Durazzo, in Macedonia, the holy martyrs Peregrinus, Lucian, Pompeius, Hesychius, Papius, Saturninus, and Germanus, natives of Italy. In the persecution of Trajan, they took refuge in the town of Durazzo, where seeing the saintly bishop Astius hanging on a cross for the faith of Christ, they publicly declared themselves to be Christians, when, by order of the governor, they were arrested and cast into the sea.")
- Saint Pantaenus the Confessor, head of the Orthodox School in Alexandria (c. 190 or 203) (Note: "At Alexandria, the birthday of St. Pantaenus, an apostolic man, filled with wisdom. He had such an affection and love for the word of God, and was so inflamed with the ardor of faith and devotion, that he set out to preach the gospel of Christ to the Gentiles inhabiting the farthest recesses of the East. At length returning to Alexandria, he rested in peace, under Antoninus Caracalla.")
- Hieromartyr Evangelus, Bishop of Tomi (Constanţa) in Moesia (c. 284-305)
- Saint Kyriaki the Great Martyr (Cyriaca, Dominica, Nedelja), of Nicomedia (289) (Note: Name days celebrated today include: Kyriake, Kyriaki, Kiki, Cyriaca, Kyriaca, Kyra, Ria, Domenica; Kyriakos, Domenic (Κυριακὴ).)
- Hieromartyr Eustathios (Eustace), by fire.
- Hieromartyrs Epictetus, presbyter, and Astion, monk, in Scythia (290)
- Venerable Acacius of Sinai, who is mentioned in The Ladder of Divine Ascent (6th century) (Note: See also: (in Russian) Акакий Синайский. Википедии. (Russian Wikipedia).)
- Venerable Thomas of Mt. Maleon (Malevon), in Laconia (10th century) (Note: See also: (in Russian) Фома Малеин. Википедии. (Russian Wikipedia).)

== Pre-Schism Western saints ==
- Saint Apollonius, an early Bishop of Brescia and Confessor. (Note: See also: (in Italian) Apollonio vescovo. Wikipedia. (Italian Wikipedia).)
- Saint Illidius (Iflidius, Allyre), fourth Bishop of Clermont in Gaul, greatly revered by St Gregory of Tours (385)
- Saint Prosper of Aquitaine, a married layman who devoted himself to theology (c.455) (Note: He was a disciple of Saint Augustine of Hippo and was the first continuator of Jerome's Universal Chronicle.)
- Saint Palladius, first Bishop of the Scots (5th century) (Note: A deacon from Rome or Auxerre in France who was sent in c 430 to preach the Gospel in Ireland. He landed near Wicklow and after some success left for Scotland, where he reposed.)
- Saint Bonitus, fourth Abbot of Monte Cassino (c. 582) (Note: At this time the Lombards plundered and destroyed the monastery.)
- Saint Felix of Nantes, a great Bishop of Nantes in France for some thirty-three years (584)
- Saints Medran and Odran, brothers and disciples of St. Kieran of Ossory (6th century) (Note: One of the brothers remained with St Kieran, while the other founded a monastery in Muskerry.)
- Saint Æthelburh of Faremoutiers (Ethelburgh, Ethelburga, Aubierge), an Anglo-Saxon princess and Abbess of Faremoutiers Abbey (c. 664) (Note: The daughter of Anna, King of East Anglia in England. She became a nun at Faremoutiers-en-Brie in France, where she became abbess after St Fara.) (Note: "In England, St. Edelburga, virgin, daughter of an English king.")
- Saint Ampelius, Bishop of Milan in Italy under the Lombards (c. 672) (Note: He exerted a great influence for good among the invading Lombards.)
- Saint Hædde (Hedda), Bishop of the West Saxons (705) (Note: A monk and abbot in England who in 676 became Bishop of Wessex. He lived in Dorchester-on-Thames and then in Winchester where his relics are preserved. He was a great benefactor of the monastery of Malmesbury. He was bishop for about forty years and was greatly esteemed for his wisdom.)
- Saint Willibald, Anglo-Saxon missionary to the Germans, Bishop of Eichstätt and Enlightener of Bavaria (c. 787) (Note: Born in Wessex in England, he was a brother of Sts Winebald and Walburgh and a cousin of St Boniface. At the age of five he was given as a monk at Waltham in Hampshire. In 722 he accompanied his father St Richard and his brother St Winebald on a pilgrimage to Rome and the Holy Land. Here he visited all the holy places and many monasteries, staying in Constantinople for two years. On his return to Italy he lived at Montecassino for ten years. Then he was sent to Germany to help St Boniface and in 742 was consecrated Bishop of Eichstätt. With his brother St Winebald he founded the monastery of Heidenheim where their sister Walburgh became abbess. His relics are still in the Cathedral in Eichstätt.) (Note: "In Saxony, St. Willibald, first bishop of Eichstadt, who labored with St. Boniface in preaching the Gospel, and converted many nations to Christ.")
- Saint Máel Ruain of Tallaght (Maolruain), founder of monastery of Tallaght in County Dublin, Ireland (787) (Note: He was also an initial compiler of the Martyrology of Tallaght, and one of the authors of the Rule of the Céli Dé.)
- Saint Angelelmus, Abbot of Sts Gervase and Protase in Auxerre in France, and then Bishop of Auxerre (828)

== Post-Schism Orthodox saints ==
- Venerable Eudoxia of Moscow, in monasticism Euphrosyne, Grand Duchess of Moscow (1407)
- Martyr Polycarp the New.
- Newly-Revealed (1923) Hieromartyr Vlasios of Akarnania (Blaise), and those with him (1006) (Note: One of the gifts from God to men is the revelation of Saint Vlasios of Akarnania and those martyred with him in the year 1006. This revelation took place in the year 1923 in the town of Palairos Sklavaina of Akarnania. He was glorified by Holy Synod of the Ecumenical Patriarchate at its regular session from Monday, 29 August to Wednesday, 31 August 2016.)

=== New martyrs and confessors ===
- New Hieromartyr Paul Chernyshev, Priest (1918)

== Other commemorations ==
- Translation (1654) of the icon of the Theotokos Blachernitissa ("Vlaherensk") from Mount Athos to Moscow.
- Kalinovka Miracle of the Bloody Crucifix (1923)
- Miracle of Restoration of the "Image not made by hands" (Acheiropoieta) of Jesus Christ in Saint Boris and Gleb women monastery, Izyum eparchy (1997)
- Uncovering of the relics (2001) of Venerable Gerasimus, Abbot of Boldin (1554) (Note: See also: (in Russian) Герасим Болдинский. Википедии. (Russian Wikipedia).)
- Repose of Archimandrite Paisius (Tanasijevic), of the St. Prochorus of Pchinja Monastery, Serbia (2003)

== Icon gallery ==
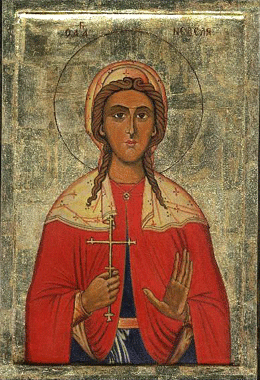
St. Kyriaki the Great Martyr of Nicomedia.

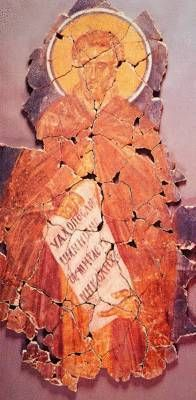
Venerable Acacius of Sinai.

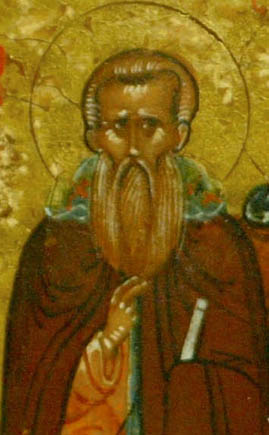
Venerable Thomas of Mt. Maleon.

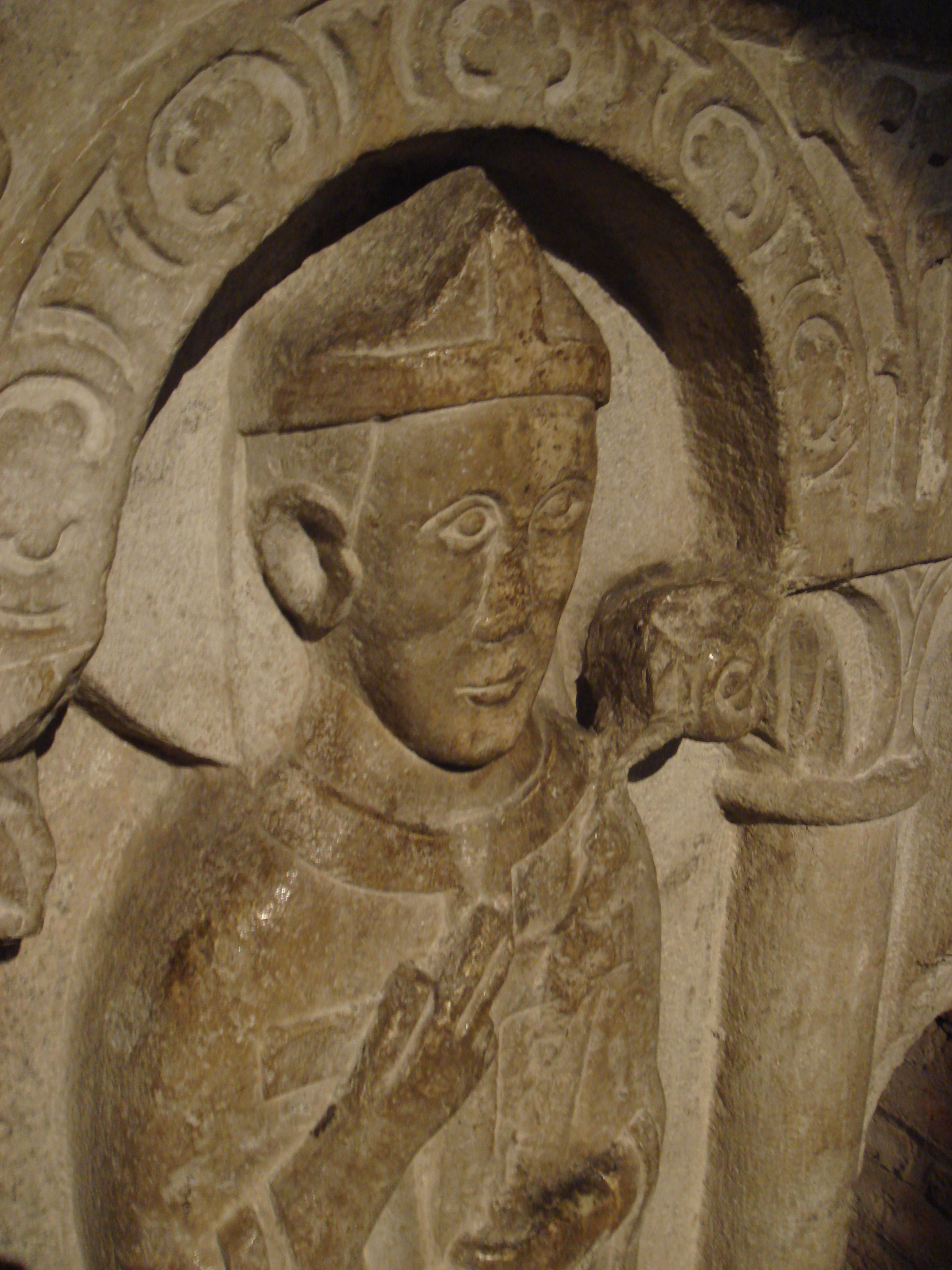
St. Apollonius, an early Bishop of Brescia.

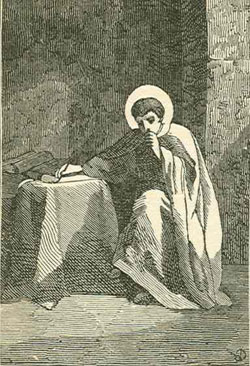
St. Prosper of Aquitaine.

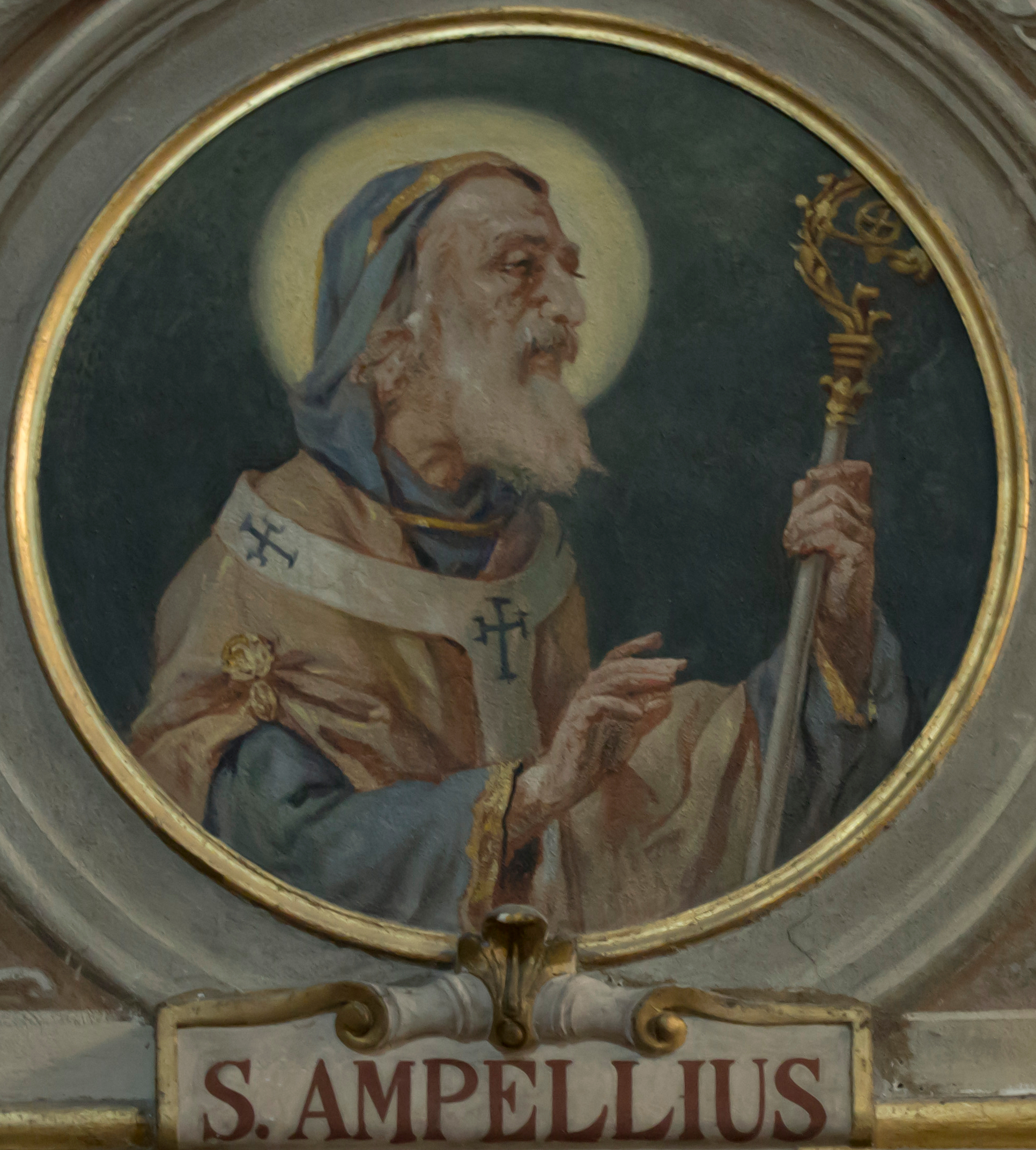
St. Ampelius, Bishop of Milan.

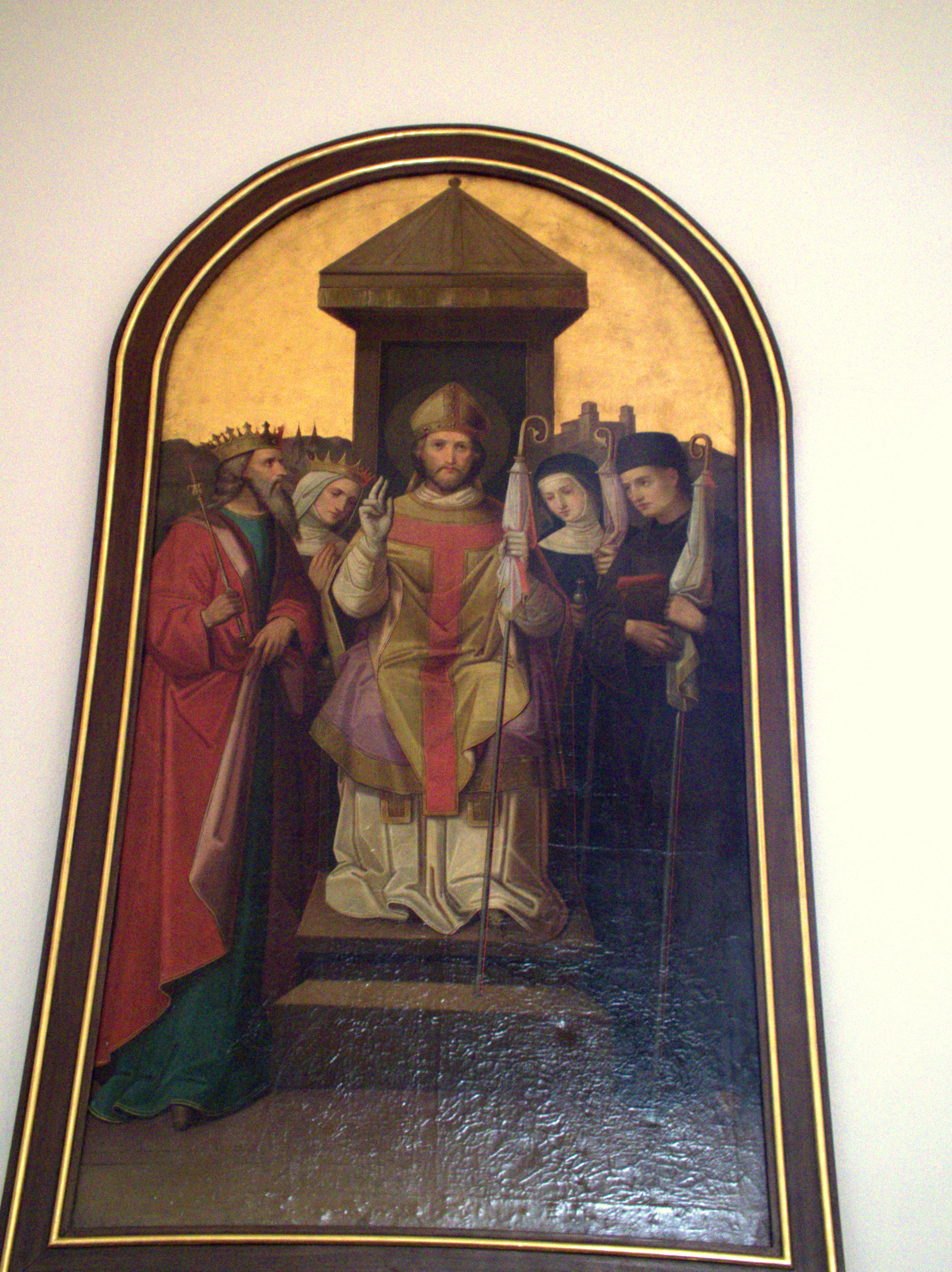
St. Willibald, Bishop of Eichstätt and Enlightener of Bavaria.

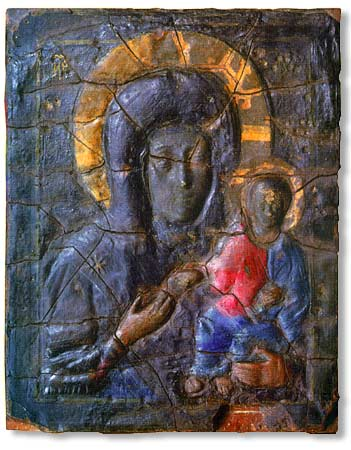
Icon of the Theotokos kept in Moscow since 1653, considered to be the Blachernitissa.

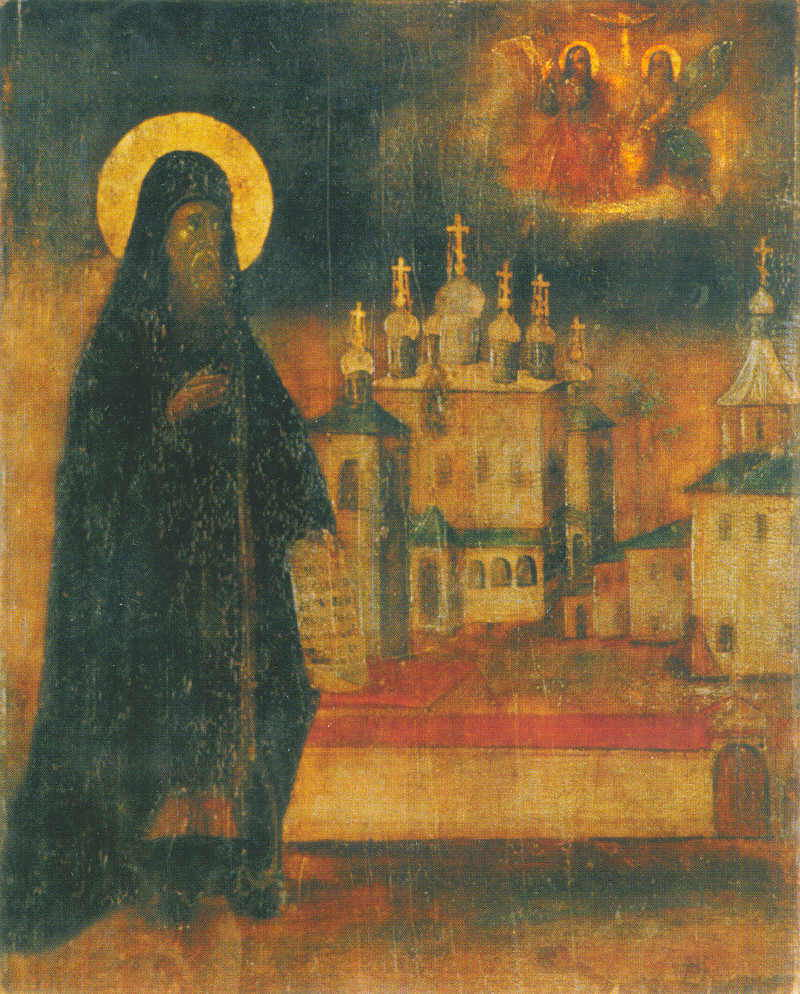
Venerable Gerasimus, Abbot of Boldin.

== Sources ==
- "July 7/July 20". Orthodox Calendar (PRAVOSLAVIE.RU).
- "July 20 / July 7". HOLY TRINITY RUSSIAN ORTHODOX CHURCH (A parish of the Patriarchate of Moscow).
- July 7. OCA - The Lives of the Saints.
- July 7. The Year of Our Salvation - Holy Transfiguration Monastery, Brookline, Massachusetts.
- The Autonomous Orthodox Metropolia of Western Europe and the Americas (ROCOR). St. Hilarion Calendar of Saints for the year of our Lord 2004. St. Hilarion Press (Austin, TX). p. 50.
- The Seventh Day of the Month of July. Orthodoxy in China.
- "July 7". Latin Saints of the Orthodox Patriarchate of Rome.
- The Roman Martyrology. Transl. by the Archbishop of Baltimore. Last Edition, According to the Copy Printed at Rome in 1914. Revised Edition, with the Imprimatur of His Eminence Cardinal Gibbons. Baltimore: John Murphy Company, 1916. pp. 197–199.
- Rev. Richard Stanton. A Menology of England and Wales, or, Brief Memorials of the Ancient British and English Saints Arranged According to the Calendar, Together with the Martyrs of the 16th and 17th Centuries. London: Burns & Oates, 1892. pp. 316–324.

Greek Sources

- Great Synaxaristes: (in Greek) 7 ΙΟΥΛΙΟΥ. ΜΕΓΑΣ ΣΥΝΑΞΑΡΙΣΤΗΣ.
- (in Greek) Συναξαριστής. 7 Ιουλίου. ECCLESIA.GR. (H ΕΚΚΛΗΣΙΑ ΤΗΣ ΕΛΛΑΔΟΣ).
- (in Greek) ΙΟΥΛΙΟΣ. Αποστολική Διακονία της Εκκλησίας της Ελλάδος (Apostoliki Diakonia of the Church of Greece).
- (in Greek) 07/07/2018. Ορθόδοξος Συναξαριστής.

Russian Sources

- (in Russian) 20 июля (7 июля). Православная Энциклопедия под редакцией Патриарха Московского и всея Руси Кирилла (электронная версия). (Orthodox Encyclopedia - Pravenc.ru).
- (in Russian) 7 июля по старому стилю / 20 июля по новому стилю. Русская Православная Церковь - Православный церковный календарь на 2018 год.
- (in Russian) 7 июля (ст.ст.) 20 июля 2014 (нов. ст.). Русская Православная Церковь Отдел внешних церковных связей. (DECR).
