= Fulk of Pavia =

Italian Catholic canon regular and prelate

Saint Fulk of Pavia, Can.Reg.
- Bishop of Pavia
- Native name: Fulco Scotti
- Church: Catholic Church
- Appointed: 1216
- Term ended: 26 October 1229
- Predecessor: Rodobaldo de' Sangiorgio
- Successor: Rodobaldo Cepolla
- Previous post: Bishop of Piacenza (1210-17)

Orders
- Consecration: c. 1216 by Pope Honorious III

Personal details
- Born: 1164 Piacenza, March of Tuscany
- Died: 26 October 1229 (aged 65) Pavia, Kingdom of Lombardy
- Buried: Cathedral of Pavia, Pavia, Italy
- Education: University of Paris

Fulk of Pavia

Bishop
- Venerated in: (Diocese of Pavia & canons regular)
- Canonized: ca. 1240, Rome, Papal States, by Pope Gregory IX
- Feast: 26 October
- Attributes: Episcopal attire

Fulk (1164 - 26 October 1229) was an Italian canon regular and prelate who served as the Bishop of Piacenza from 1210 until 1217 and later as the Bishop of Pavia from 1217 until his death. He served in various capacities prior to his episcopal appointment, such as provost of his religious community. He was known for making the effort of keeping out of political affairs since he wanted to dedicate himself more to diocesan affairs.

Appointed bishop of Piacenza in 1210 by Pope Innocent III, Fulk was not consecrated as a bishop until 1216, only to be was transferred and some months after to the Diocese of Pavia, where he would remain until his death in 1229.

== Life ==
Fulk was born in Piacenza in 1164 to Scottish parents who had Irish origins; he was also known as Folco Scotti with that surname being given during those times to Irish people who emigrated to the Italian mainland. In 1184 he entered the Canons Regular of Sant'Eufemia before he did theological studies in Paris at the college there after having been sent there around 1185 (though he did first do his studies in Piacenza). In or near 1194 he became the prior for Sant'Eufemia.

Fulk for a brief period taught theological studies to students in Piacenza. He was appointed as a canon in Piacenza and after his studies in Paris became the archpriest for Piacenza. He later was appointed as the Bishop of Piacenza on 2 August 1210. His selection received approval from the papal legate and Bishop of Novara Gherardo da Sessia, who ensured that Pope Innocent III confirmed the selection. The pope himself conferred episcopal consecration upon him in 1216 just before transferring him to Pavia.

It has been alleged in some sources that Fulk attended the Fourth Council of the Lateran in 1215. Fulk died on 26 October 1229 in Pavia and after his death Pope Gregory IX canonized him as a saint during his pontificate; his remains were transferred from the old to new cathedral in 1567.
