= Francesco Biglia =

17th-century Roman Catholic bishop

Most Reverend Francesco Biglia
- Bishop of Pavia
- Church: Catholic Church
- Diocese: Diocese of Pavia
- In office: 1648–1659
- Predecessor: Giovanni Battista Sfondrati
- Successor: Girolamo Melzi

Personal details
- Born: 1587 Mezzana Biglia, Italy
- Died: 4 Jun 1659 (age 72) Milan, Italy

Francesco Biglia (1587–1659) was a Roman Catholic prelate who served as Bishop of Pavia (1648–1659).

== Biography ==
Francesco Biglia was born in 1587 in Mezzana Biglia, Italy. On 10 Feb 1648, he was appointed during the papacy of Pope Innocent X as Bishop of Pavia. On 24 Jan 1649, he was consecrated bishop by Giovanni Giacomo Panciroli, Cardinal-Priest of Santo Stefano al Monte Celio. He served as Bishop of Pavia until his death on 4 Jun 1659 in Milan, Italy.

While bishop, he was the principal co-consecrator of: Andreas Lanfranchi, Bishop of Ugento (1651); Benedetto Geraci, Bishop of Lipari (1651); and Filippo Casoni, Bishop of Borgo San Donnino (1651).

== External links and additional sources ==
- Cheney, David M. "Diocese of Pavia". Catholic-Hierarchy.org. (for Chronology of Bishops) ^{[self-published]}
- Chow, Gabriel. "Diocese of Pavia (Italy)". GCatholic.org. (for Chronology of Bishops) ^{[self-published]}

Catholic Church titles
Preceded by Giovanni Battista Sfondrati	Bishop of Pavia; 1648–1659	Succeeded by Girolamo Melzi
