= Pavia Cathedral =

Church in Pavia, Italy

Coordinates: 45°11′4.5″N 9°9′13″E

Pavia Cathedral Duomo di Pavia
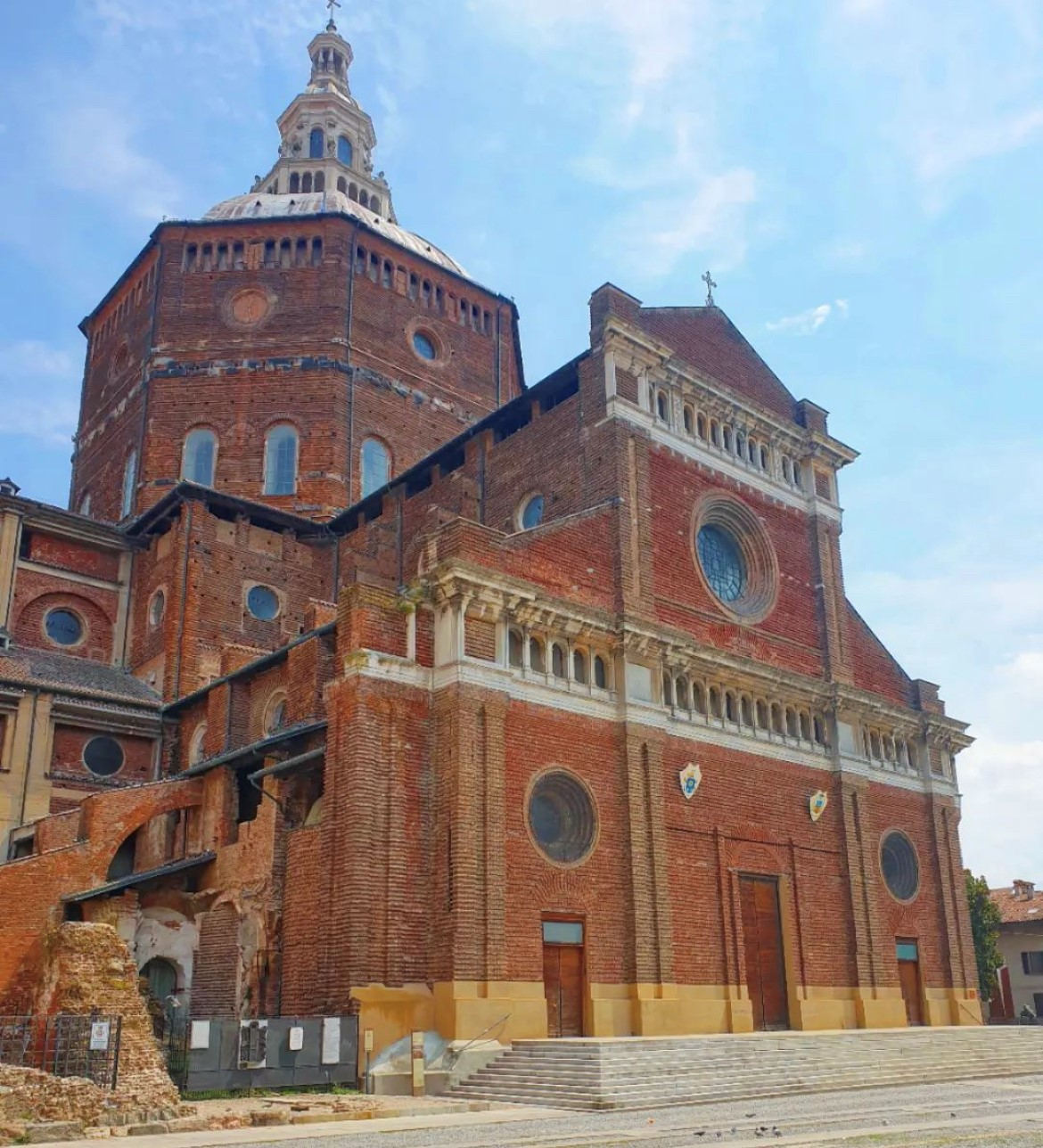
- West front of the cathedral

Religion
- Affiliation: Roman Catholic
- Province: Pavia

Location
- Location: Pavia, Italy
- Interactive map of Pavia Cathedral; Duomo di Pavia

Architecture
- Architects: Donato Bramante, Giovanni Antonio Amadeo, Gian Giacomo Dolcebuono and Cristoforo Rocchi
- Type: Church
- Style: Renaissance
- Groundbreaking: 15th century

Pavia Cathedral (Italian: Duomo di Pavia) is a cathedral in Pavia, Italy, and seat of the Diocese of Pavia. The construction was begun in the 15th century on the site of two pre-existing Romanesque, "twin" cathedrals (Santo Stefano and Santa Maria del Popolo). The cathedral houses the remains of St. Sirus, first Bishop of Pavia, and a thorn purported to be from the Crown of Thorns worn by Christ. The marble facing of the exterior was never completed.

The Civic Tower (Torre Civica), known in 1330 and enlarged in 1583, formerly stood next to the cathedral. It collapsed on March 17, 1989.

== History ==
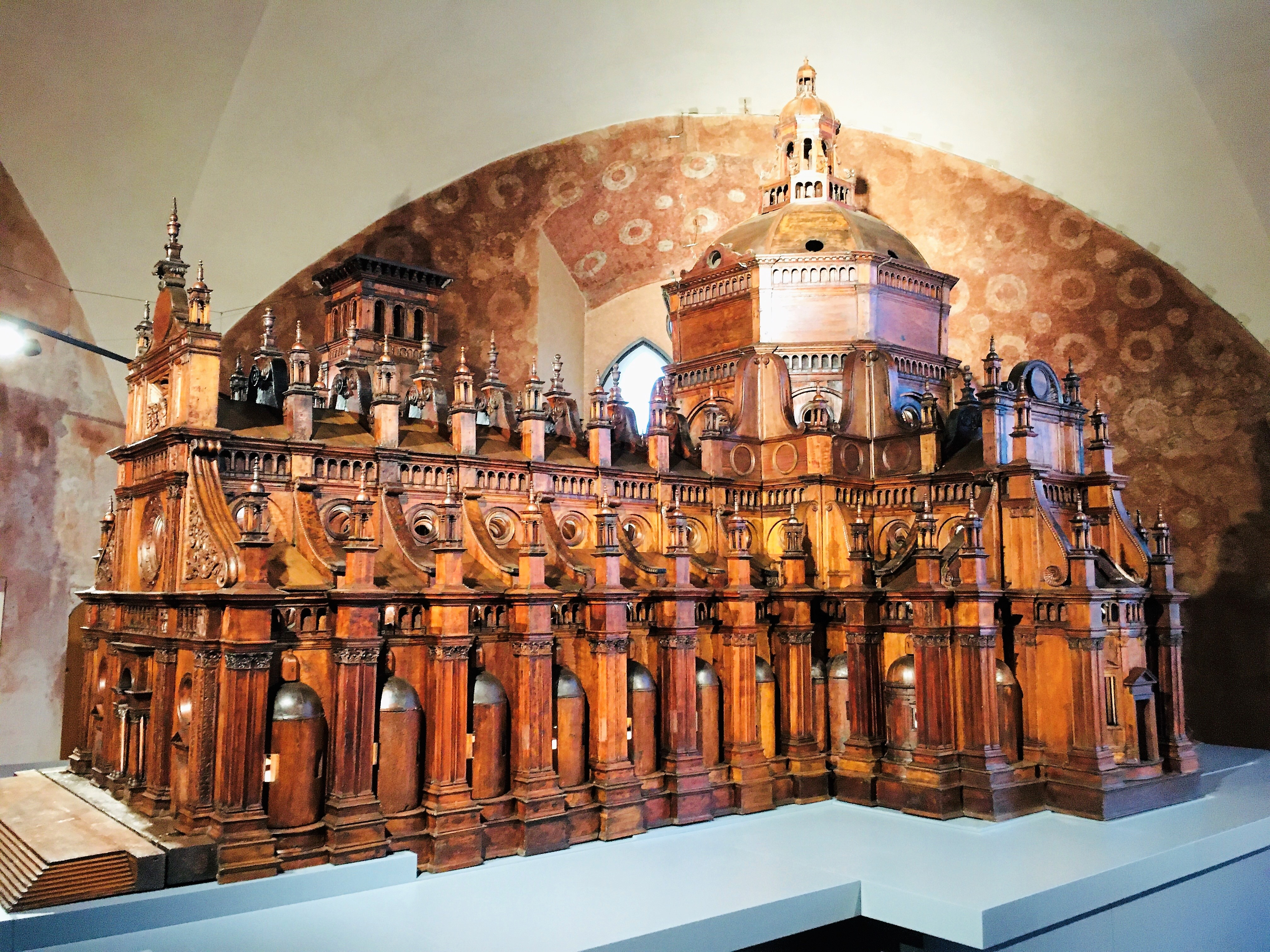
Model of the Cathedral, 1487–1488, Pavia Civic Museums.

The "twin" cathedrals of Santo Stefano and Santa Maria Maggiore, commonly called Santa Maria del Popolo, once stood on the area currently occupied by the cathedral. The two original churches were founded between the sixth and seventh centuries and subsequently renovated, but around the eleventh-twelfth century they were rebuilt in Romanesque forms. The two churches were deconsecrated and progressively demolished as the Renaissance construction site advanced; the last elements to be destroyed were the remains of the façades, landed at the end of the 19th century to make way for the front of the new Cathedral, while a large part of the crypt (from the 11th century) of Santa Maria del Popolo was preserved.

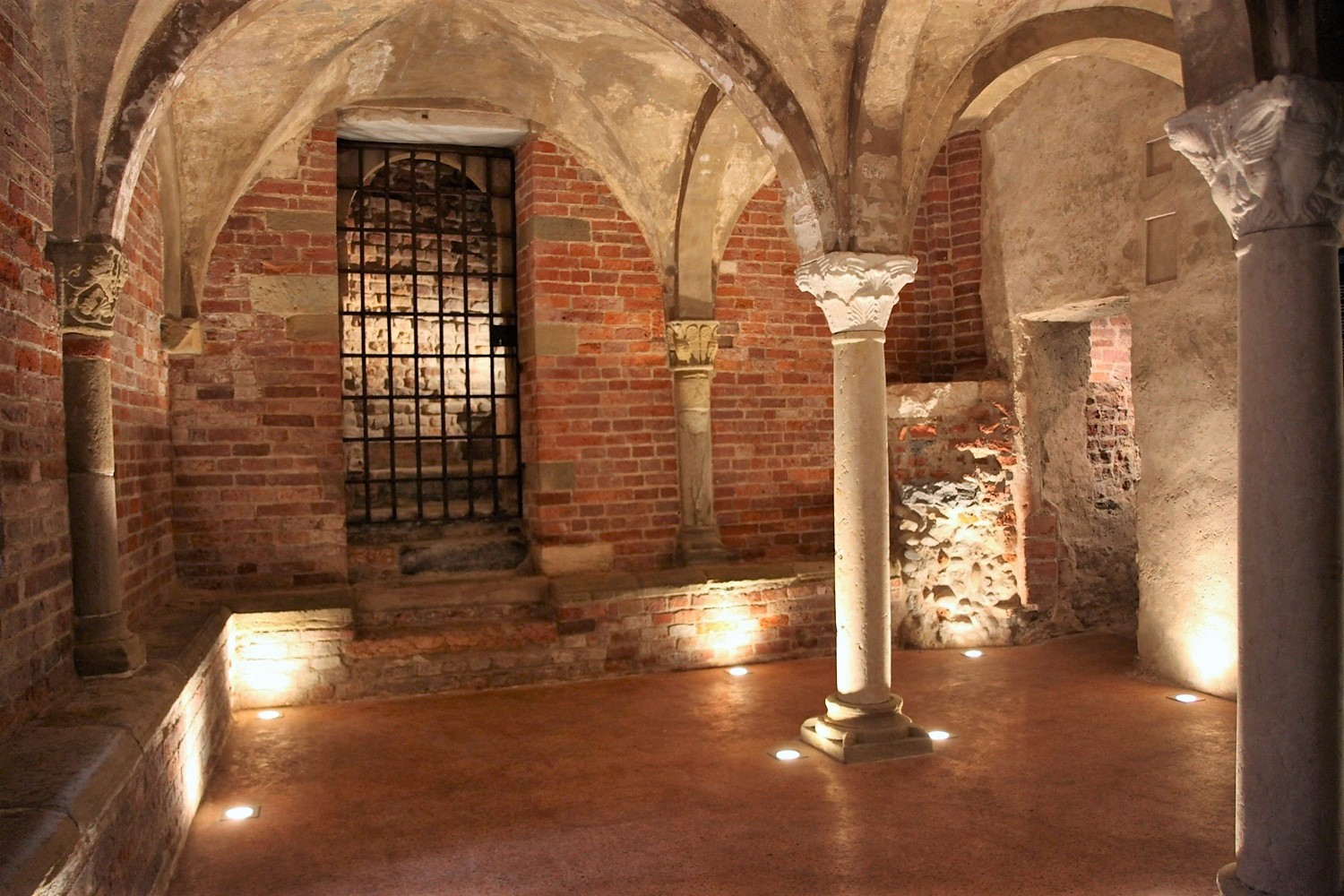
Crypt of Santa Maria del Popolo, 11th century.

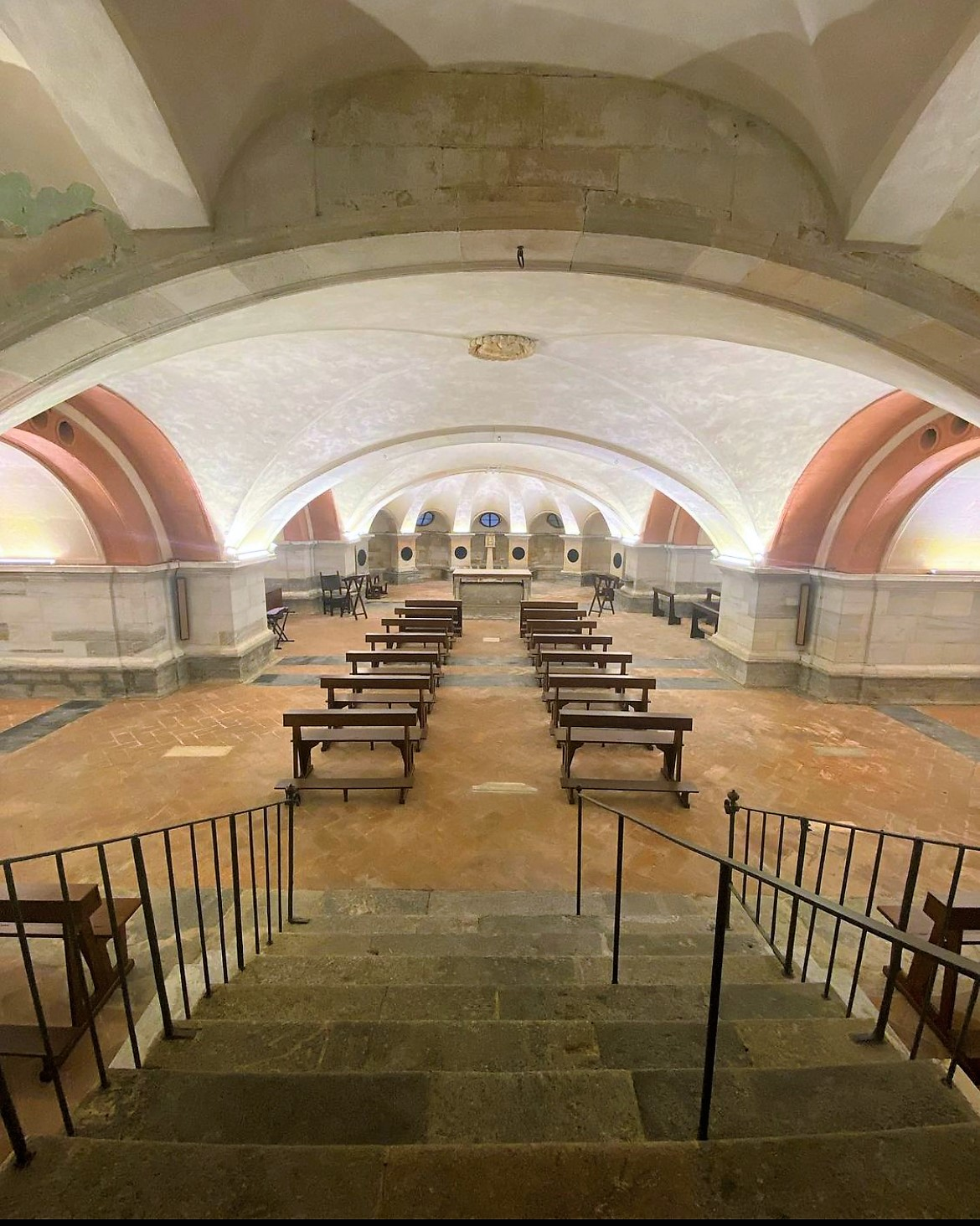
Crypt designed by Bramante, 1492.

The cathedral was begun in 1488, under architect Cristoforo Rocchi, who was soon replaced by Giovanni Antonio Amadeo and Gian Giacomo Dolcebuono. The original project, with a nave and two aisles flanked by semicircular niches and a large central dome, was influenced by Bramante, some details of it later appearing in St. Peter's Basilica in Rome. Leonardo da Vinci is also known to have contributed to the project. In particular, the planimetric project, the design of the crypt (completed in 1492), of the base part of the apse area of the building and of the sacristies are attributed to Bramante. The crypt, like other buildings made by Bramante, has a central plan, divided into two naves structured on two spans. The large pillars, which support lowered vaults, and the pointed arches of the central nave recall the thermal rooms of the classical age and the nymphaeums, such as that of the Horti Sallustiani in Rome. In 1521, the altar area was completed by Giampietrino Rizzi, a pupil of Da Vinci. By the 17th century, the presbytery had been completed but only in the following century was the tholobate built, while the dome itself and the façade had to wait for the 19th century. The dome was designed by Carlo Maciachini and completed in 1885, but partially collapsed the same year. In 1930, construction continued with the two arms of the transept, for which the original plan was followed, although using reinforced concrete (in order to save the remains of the medieval Santa Maria del Popolo). The arms are still missing part of the internal marble decoration.

== Overview ==
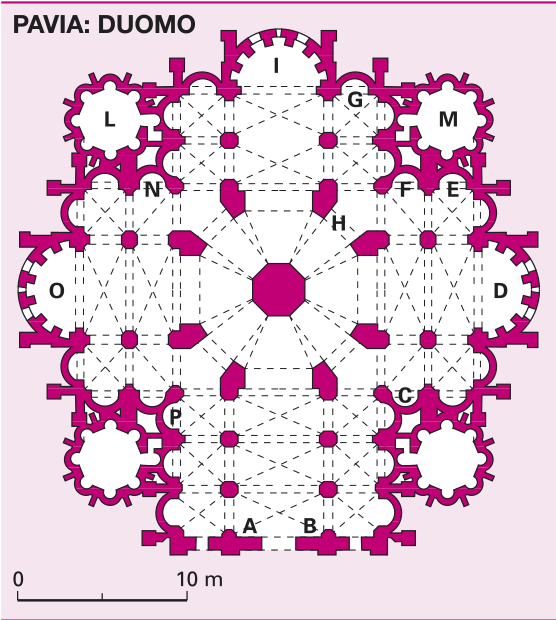
Plan of Pavia Cathedral. Scale 0:10 m. (A‑B) Counter‑facade, (C‑H) Right transept, (I) Presbytery, (L) Sacristy, (M) Canons' sacristy, (N‑P) Left transept

The church is on the Greek Cross plan: it therefore has the same length and width at the transept. At about 84 m (276 ft), it is one of the largest edifices with a central plan in northern Italy. The central dome, with an octagonal plan, is 97 m (318 ft) tall, with a total weight of some 20,000 tons. It is the fourth in Italy in size, after St. Peter's Basilica, the Pantheon and the Cathedral of Florence.

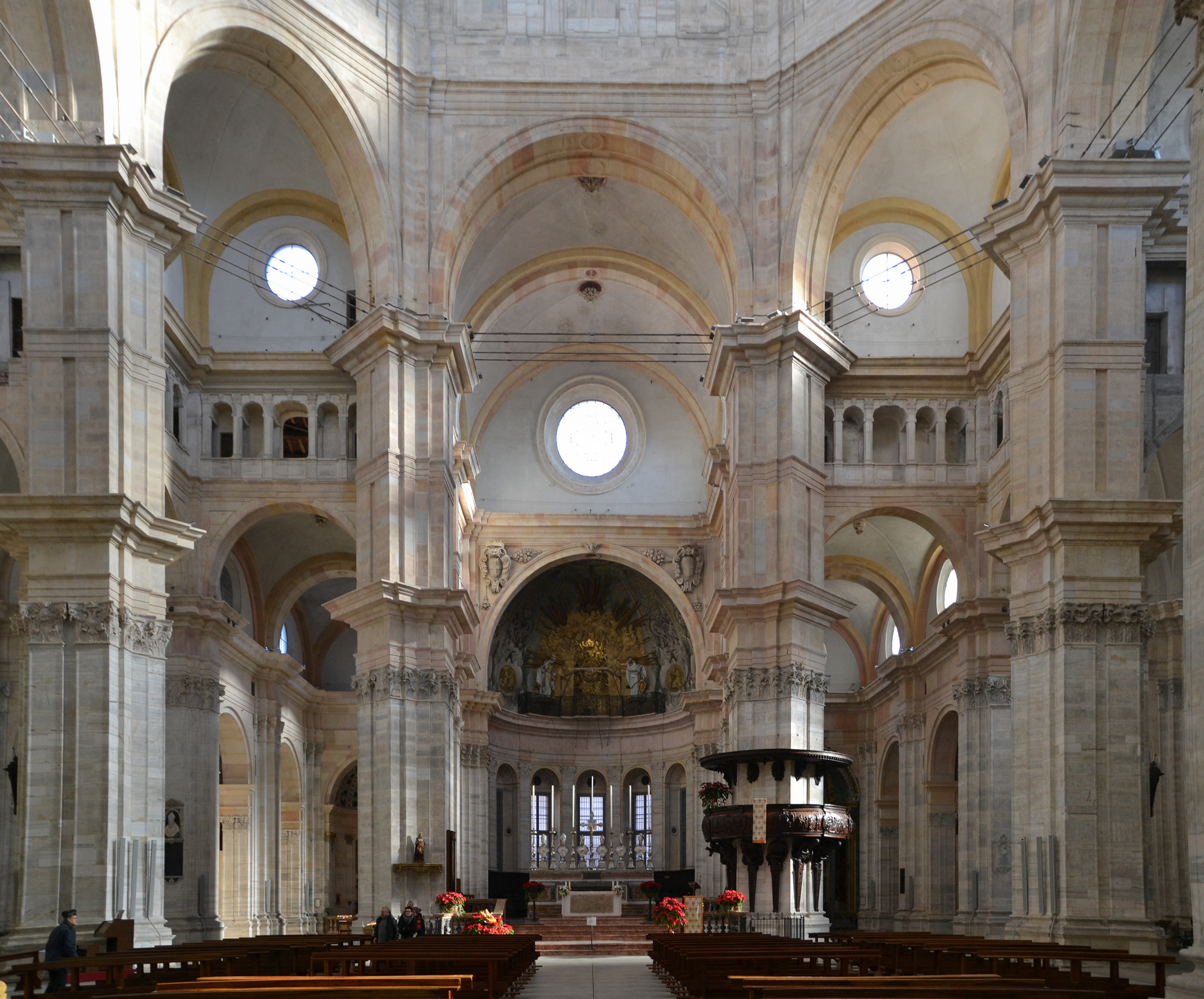
Interior.

The monument is a large building. The church develops on three naves (the central double of the lateral ones and crossed by a practicable gallery), both in the longitudinal body and in the transept. The side aisles are flanked by semicircular chapels. The interior, with pure Renaissance architectural lines, gives an impression of great grandeur, amplified by the brightness of the very white marble cladding. On the counter-façade, two masterpieces of the Baroque period: Madonna and ss. Siro and Antonio, by Giovanni Battista Crespi, known as Cerano, and Adoration of the Magi, by Daniele Crespi. In the apse there is an imposing Baroque decoration, consisting of stuccos and frescoes. The structure depicts a radiant cave with golden clouds in the center of which two angels hold up a large crown of thorns. Around it there are cherubs and angels and on the sides two symbolic figures of Religion and the Fatherland. This plant surrounds the seventeenth-century reliquary in silver and crystal containing the Holy Thorns of Christ's crown. In fact, three thorns are preserved in the Cathedral, which according to tradition were found by Saint Helena, mother of Emperor Constantine, around 327. The thorns are lowered from above during the Pentecost vigil to be carried in procession on following Monday. This tradition has been repeated since 1645.

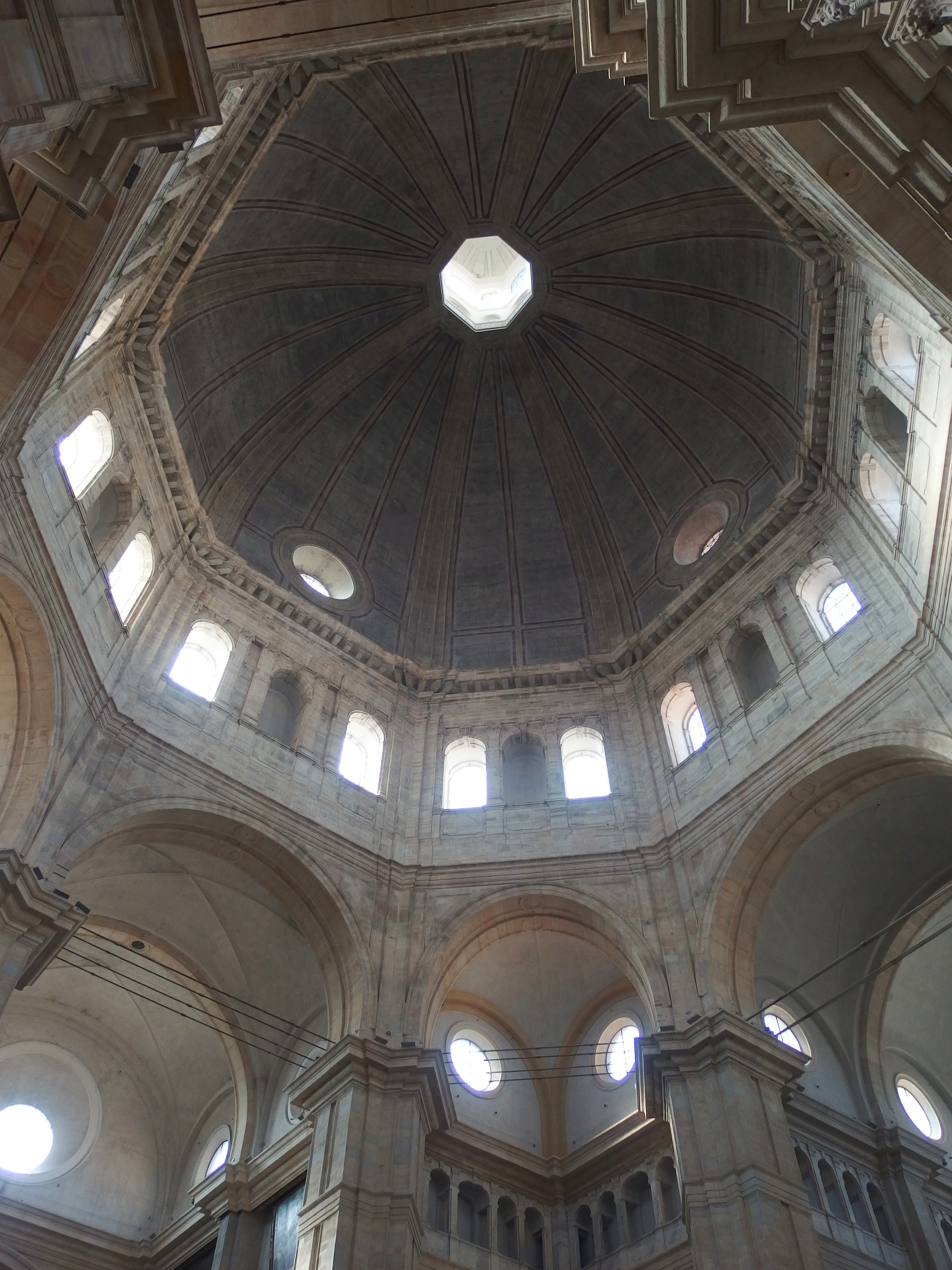
The dome.

In the apse of the left transept, in the center, the Altar of the Confraternity of suffrage, built by the Genoese Tommaso Orsolino in 1644–46 and remodeled in 1652 with the addition of two columns and other elements of precious marble. In the apse of the right transept, the Altar of Saint Syrus, first bishop of Pavia (III–IV century), with double front. Above the nineteenth-century crystal urn with the remains of the saint, there is a monumental ancona in white marble with an alabaster base from the Orsolino (1645–1650) depicting the Virgin delivering the keys of the city to Saint Syrus.

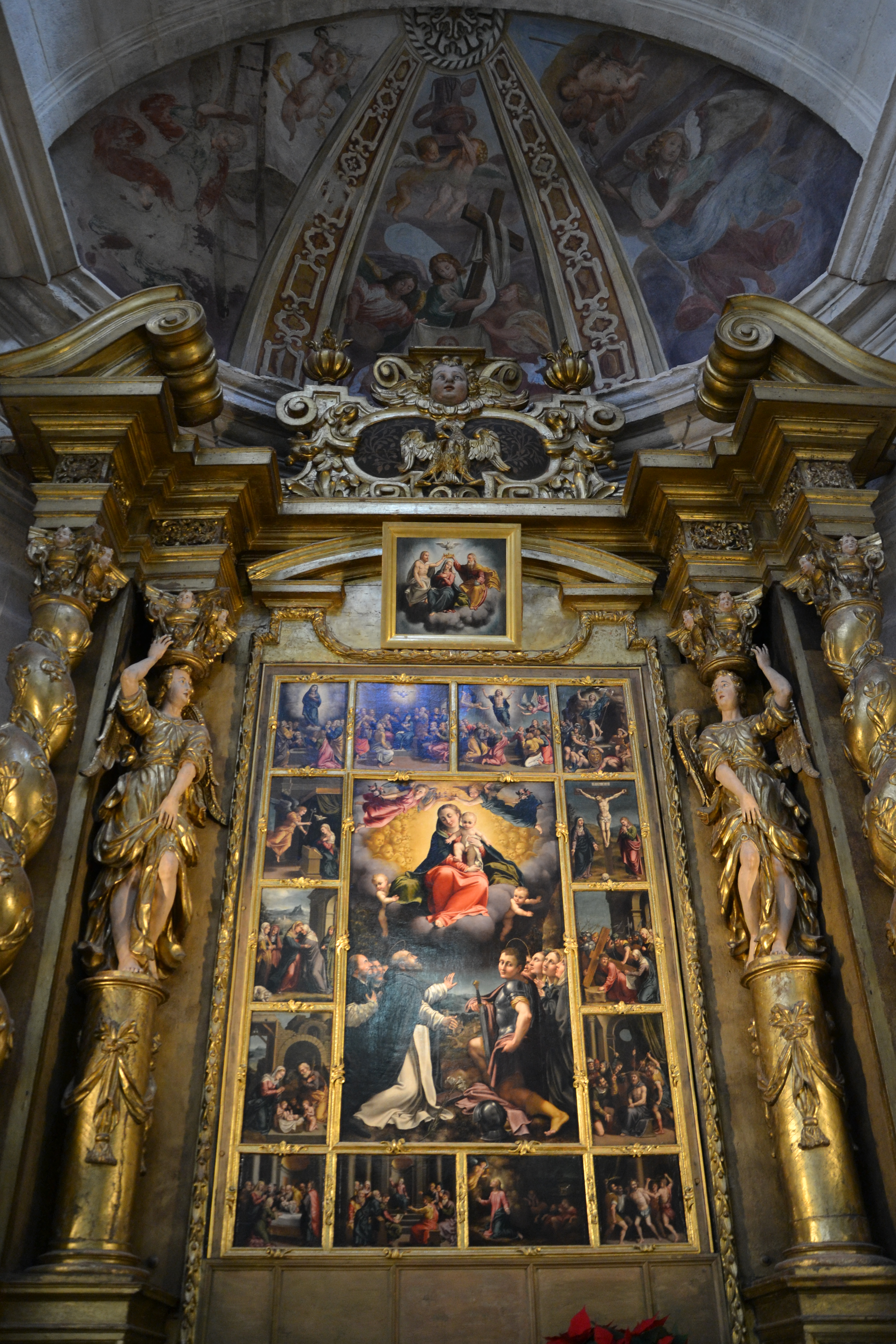
Bernardino Gatti, Our Lady of the Rosary (1531).

On the east side of the right transept is the Chapel of Our Lady of the Rosary previously dedicated to the passion. On the altar there is a canvas by the Pavese artist Bernardino Gatti known as Sojaro (1530–1531) depicting the Madonna with the child, Saint Dominc and Saint Alexander. Fifteen episodes referring to the mysteries of the rosary are represented in the outline of the painting (to be read counterclockwise).

In the left aisle, in the third chapel, there is an altarpiece depicting the Immaculate Conception. painted by Federico Faruffini on behalf of the canon Giovanni Battista Bosisio in 1857. At the foot of the Virgin you can see the outline of the city of Pavia, while on the architrave there is the inscription Fecit mihi magna qui potens est. On the sides of the altar are the statues of the parents of the Virgin, Joachim and Anna. The remains of the bishop of Pavia Saint Damian of Pavia (VII century) are placed under the altar.

== See also ==
- Late medieval domes
- Italian Renaissance domes
