= Pompeius of Pavia =

Italian Roman Catholic saint

Saint Pompeius

Bishop of Pavia
- Died: 290
- Venerated in: Roman Catholic Church; Eastern Orthodox Church
- Canonized: Pre-congregation
- Feast: 14 December

Pompeius of Pavia was Bishop of Pavia. It is believed that he may have suffered under Roman persecution, but he is not listed as a martyr.
