= Fabrizio Landriani =

1xth-century Roman Catholic bishop

Most Reverend Fabrizio Landriani
- Bishop of Pavia
- Church: Catholic Church
- Diocese: Diocese of Pavia
- In office: 1617–1642
- Predecessor: Giovanni Battista Biglia
- Successor: Giovanni Battista Sfondrati

Orders
- Consecration: 10 Sep 1617 by Giambattista Leni

Personal details
- Born: Milan, Italy
- Died: 1642

Fabrizio Landriani (died 1642) was a Roman Catholic prelate who served as Bishop of Pavia (1617–1642).

== Biography ==
Fabrizio Landriani was born in Milan, Italy. On 17 Jul 1617, he was appointed during the papacy of Pope Paul V as Bishop of Pavia. On 10 Sep 1617, he was consecrated bishop by Giambattista Leni, Bishop of Ferrara, with Francesco Sacrati, Titular Archbishop of Damascus, and Evangelista Tornioli, Bishop of Città di Castello, serving as co-consecrators. He served as Bishop of Pavia until his death in 1642.

== Episcopal succession ==
While bishop, he was the principal co-consecrator of:

- Pietro Campori, Bishop of Cremona (1621);
- Giulio Roma, Bishop of Recanati e Loreto (1621);
- Desiderio Scaglia, Bishop of Melfi e Rapolla (1621); and
- Ottavio Orsini, Bishop of Venafro (1621).

== External links and additional sources ==
- Cheney, David M. "Diocese of Pavia". Catholic-Hierarchy.org. (for Chronology of Bishops) ^{[self-published]}
- Chow, Gabriel. "Diocese of Pavia". GCatholic.org. (for Chronology of Bishops) ^{[self-published]}

Catholic Church titles
Preceded by Giovanni Battista Biglia	Bishop of Pavia; 1617–1642	Succeeded by Giovanni Battista Sfondrati
