= Maximus of Pavia =

Italian Roman Catholic saint

Saint Maximus

Bishop of Pavia
- Died: 511
- Venerated in: Roman Catholic Church, Orthodox Church
- Canonized: Pre-congregation
- Feast: 8 January

Maximus was Bishop of Pavia. He was in attendance at councils of Rome convened under Pope Symmachus.
