= Jerome of Pavia =

Italian Roman Catholic saint

Saint Jerome of Pavia

Bishop of Pavia
- Died: 787
- Venerated in: Roman Catholic Church; Eastern Orthodox Church
- Canonized: Pre-congregation
- Feast: 19 July

Jerome of Pavia, also known as Gerolamo, was Bishop of Pavia, from 778 until his death. He is recognised as a saint in the Eastern Orthodox Church and Roman Catholic Church. Jerome's cultus was confirmed in the Roman Catholic Church on 20 December 1888 by Pope Leo XIII. The feast is celebrated on 19 July.
