= Benedict (bishop of Milan) =

Archbishop of Milan from c. 685–732

- Archbishop of Milan
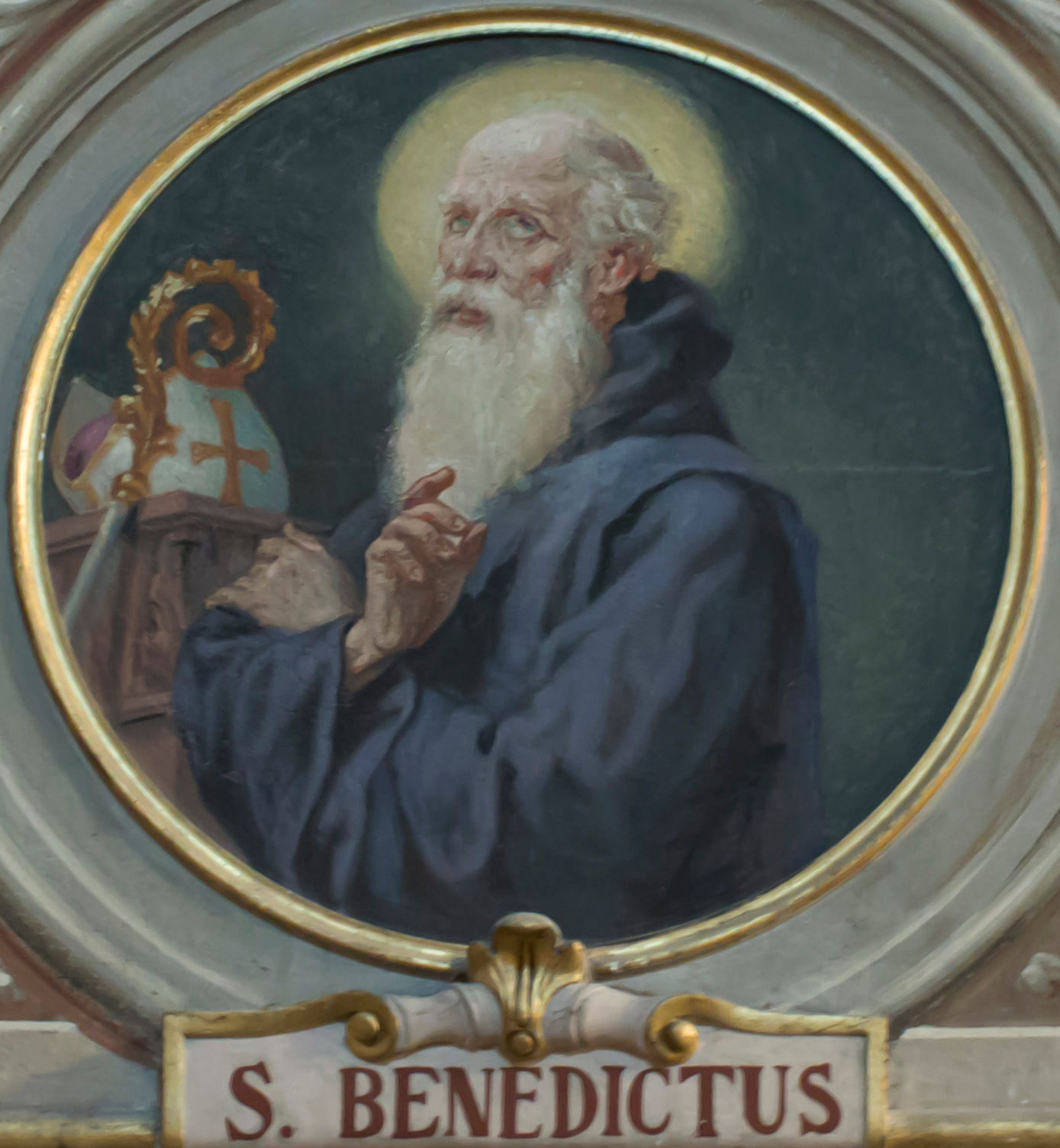
- Church: Catholic Church
- Appointed: c. 685
- Term ended: 732
- Predecessor: Mansuetus
- Successor: Theodorus II

Personal details
- Died: Between 9 and 11 March 732

Sainthood
- Feast day: 11 March
- Venerated in: Catholic and Eastern Orthodox churches

Benedict (Latin: Benedictus, Italian: Benedetto) was Archbishop of Milan from c. 685–732. He is honoured as a saint in the Catholic and Eastern Orthodox churches.

== Life ==
Benedict was archbishop of Milan from c. 685 until his death in March 732. Among the sparse information about his life, it is known that he wrote the epitaph for Caedwalla, the king of Wessex who was buried in St. Peter's Basilica in Rome.

Benedict returned to Rome at the time of Pope Constantine, where he opposed the claim of the bishop of Pavia, Armentarius, that Pavia was immediately subject to Rome. Benedict reminded the Pope that Pavia historically was under the Metropolitan See of Milan and that the bishop of Pavia used to be consecrated by the one of Milan. The pope, however, ruled in favour of Armentarius, perhaps due to a privilege granted at the time of Evodius or because Pavia was the capital of the Kingdom of the Lombards.

Benedict was responsible for the construction of a church and a monastery in Milan, of which no trace remains. He probably was influential in settling the Schism of the Three Chapters. Paul the Deacon, about fifty years after his death, remembered him as a saint venerated all over Italy. The day of his death was between 9 and 11 March 732. A poem written about ten years after his death, De laudibus Mediolani, praises him and informs us that he was buried in the Basilica of Sant'Ambrogio. His feast day is 11 March in the Eastern Orthodox Church and in the Roman Rite; it is 6 September in the Ambrosian Rite.

A late tradition, with no historical basis, associates Benedict with the Milan's family of the Crespi.
