= Diocese of Pavia =

Roman Catholic diocese in Italy

Diocese of Pavia Dioecesis Papiensis

Catholic
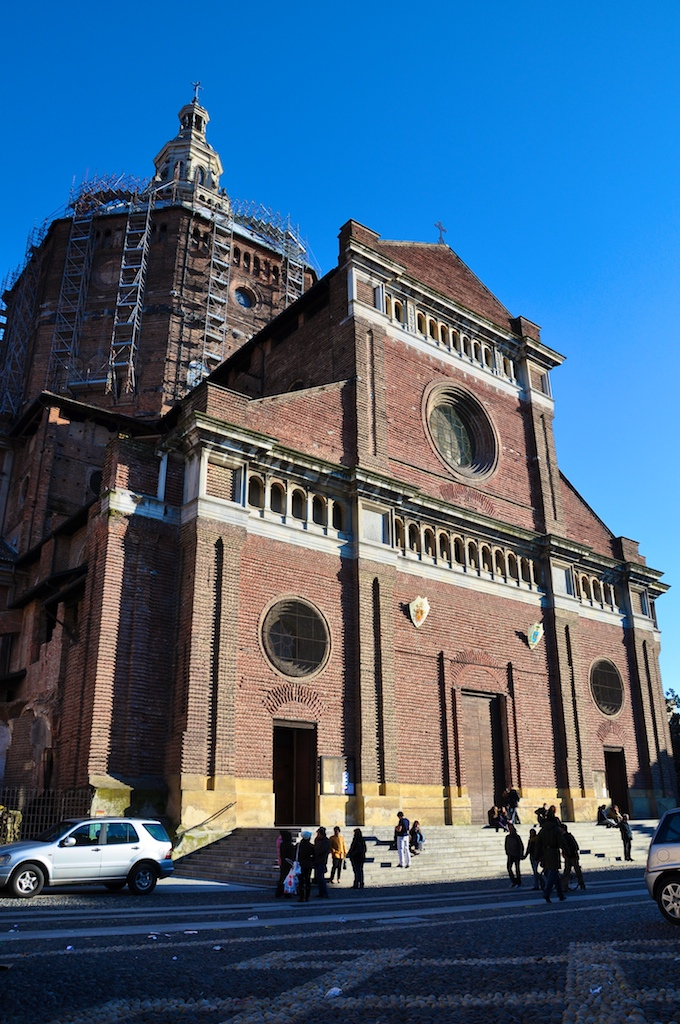
- Pavia Cathedral

Location
- Country: Italy
- Ecclesiastical province: Milan

Statistics
- Area: 782 km^{2} (302 sq mi)
- Population: Total; Catholics: (as of 2021); 191,320; 178,645 (93.4%)
- Parishes: 100

Information
- Rite: Roman
- Established: 3rd Century
- Cathedral: Cattedrale di Maria Assunta e S. Stefano Protomartire
- Secular priests: 117 (diocesan); 25 (Religious Orders); 6 Permanent Deacons

Current leadership
- Pope: Leo XIV
- Bishop: Corrado Sanguineti

Map

Website
- www.diocesi.pavia.it

The Diocese of Pavia (Latin: Dioecesis Papiensis) is a Latin diocese of the Catholic Church in Italy. It has been a suffragan of the Archdiocese of Milan only since 1817. Previous to the reorganization of the hierarchy in northern Italy by Pope Pius VII after the expulsion of the French and the Congress of Vienna, the diocese of Pavia had depended directly upon the Holy See, despite repeated failed attempts on the part of the Archbishops of Milan to claim control. The diocese has produced one Pope and Patriarch of Venice, and three cardinals.

The seat of the bishop is the Cattedrale di Maria Assunta e S. Stefano Protomartire in Pavia. The current bishop of Pavia is Corrado Sanguineti, appointed by Pope Francis on 1 December 2015.

== History ==
Pavia was the capital of the Lombard Kingdom of Italy (from 570) and of their successors, the Holy Roman Emperors as Kings of Italy. There was a royal palace in Pavia, which saw frequent visits from the Emperors.

Pope Hormisdas (517–523) is said to have granted Bishop Ennodius and his successors as Bishops of Pavia the use of the pallium. This claim has, however, been challenged. Pope John VIII also granted the Bishops of Pavia the same privilege in a letter of 24 August 877.

In the last week of June 743, Pope Zacharias (741–752) visited Pavia and solemnly celebrated the Feast of S. Peter at the monastery of S. Pietro in Ciel d'oro.

Bishop Joannes (II) (874–911 ?) signed the confirmation of the accession of Charles the Bald and took the oath of allegiance in February 876.

Pope John VIII held a synod at Pavia in December 878, as he was returning to Rome from his trip to France.

In 885, Pope Stephen V (885–891) granted the Bishop of Pavia the duchy of Comacchio.

A synod met in Pavia in 889 to ratify the selection of Guido of Spoleto as King of Italy, and to swear feudal allegiance. A council was held at Pavia in 933 to expel Bishop Ratherius of Verona from his diocese for three years, because of his opposition to Hugh of Arles, King of Italy. He was restored by a synod under orders from Pope John XII.

On 2 April 987, Bishop Guido and the Canons of the Cathedral received a rebuke from Pope John XV because they had been harassing the monastery of S. Pietro in Ciel d'oro.

In 997, Pope Gregory V (Bruno of Carinthia) held a synod in Pavia. He had been expelled from Rome shortly after the Coronation of the Emperor Otto III, his cousin, who had procured his election to the papal throne at the request of the Romans themselves. Shortly after his coronation, Otto condemned and expelled from Rome the former dictator of the City, Crescentius of Nomentum. As soon as Otto left the city, Crescentius returned and drove out Pope Gregory, who fled to Pavia. At the synod of Pavia, the rule against making agreements about a future pope during the lifetime of the present pope was reenacted, as were rules against simony. Crescentius was excommunicated, and, on the Pope's return to Rome, was beheaded in the Castel S. Angelo.

On 15 April 1123, Pope Calixtus II confirmed all the privileges belonging to the Church of Pavia, and issued a ruling that, at Roman synods, the Bishop of Pavia should hold the first seat on the left of the pope, perpetualiter.

Bishop Pietro Toscani (1148–1180) was deprived of his episcopal cross and his pallium by Pope Alexander III in 1175 or 1176, because of his support for the Antipope Victor IV and the excommunicated Frederick Barbarossa. Frederick continued to protect him, however, even though the city of Pavia joined the Lombard League. After the Lombard League triumphed over Frederick at the Battle of Legnano, the Bishop's position became precarious. When Alexander reached an agreement with Frederick at their conference at Venice, Bishop Pietro was among those forgiven for their crimes.

The Studium Generale (University) of Pavia was founded on 13 April 1361 by a diploma of the Emperor Charles IV, at the request of Galeazzo Visconti of Milan. The University Library was established in 1754 by order of the Empress Maria Theresa, who refounded the entire university which had fallen into a long decadence. In 1867 the University had 926 students.

On 15 February 1743, by an Apostolic Brief of Pope Benedict XIV, the diocese of Pavia was united with the metropolitan diocese of Amaseia (Hellespont, Turkey). Thereafter the Bishop of Pavia was also an archbishop.

=== Cathedral and Chapter ===
In 816, the Emperor Louis the Pious held a council at Aix, at which it was ordered that Canons and Canonesses live together according to a set of rules (canons, regulae). In the Roman synod of Pope Eugene II of November 826, it was ordered that Canons live together in a cloister next to the church. In 876, the Council of Pavia decreed in Canon X that the bishops should enclose the Canons: uti episcopi in civitatibus suis proximum ecclesiae claustrum instituant, in quo ipsi cum clero secundum canonicam regulam Deo militent, et sacerdotes suos ad hoc constringant, ut ecclesiam non relinquant et alibi habitare praesumant.

The Cathedral Chapter, in 1571, consisted of four dignities (the Provost, the Archdeacon, the Archpriest, and the Cantor) and twelve Canons. On 29 February 1572, Bishop Ippolito Rossi (1564–1591), acting in accordance with the Bull In Eminenti of Pope Pius IV of 30 May 1571, suppressed the Collegiate Church of Santa Maria in Pertica in the city of Pavia, and transferred its Provost and seven Canons to the Cathedral Chapter. The title of the Provost of Santa Maria was changed to that of Dean of the Cathedral Chapter, which thereafter had five dignities and nineteen Canons. In 1672 there were five dignities and sixteen Canons. On 25 April 1577 Bishop Rossi also provided new regulations for the College of Chaplains in the cathedral. That college was led by a prior, mansionarii, and a curate.

In 1110, Bishop Guido (1103–1118) granted the Cathedral Chapter of Pavia the right to the decima in the city of Pavia and for eight miles round about. This grant was confirmed by Bishop Petrus Spelta (1343–1356) on 4 November 1350.

On 4 December 1341, Canon Mascarino Tacconi, Vicar General of Bishop Giovanni Fulgesi (1328–1342), issued Statutes for the Cathedral Chapter of Pavia. On 7 January and 29 March 1342, two canons swore to observe the statutes issued by the Bishop's vicar. The canons, however, became more and more lax, until the Franciscan bishop Guilelmus (1386–1402) issued a warning on 12 January 1387 concerning certain duties which they were expected to perform, including the obligation to say Mass in the cathedral; the Bishop's warning included penalties for failing to comply. On 7 March, the chapter passed on the warnings to the chaplains of the cathedral, with extensive instructions.

On 3 September 1484, the cathedral chapter on its own initiative compiled a new edition of the statutes of the cathedral chapter. On 9 August 1507 Canon Vincenzo Beccaria, the Vicar General of the bishop Cardinal Francesco Alidosio (who was absent, serving as papal legate in Bologna), issued statutes for the canons and chaplains of the cathedral. The canons themselves issued more specific regulations regarding residence and the performance of choir duties on 21 January 1518; these were confirmed on 6 February by Canon Girolamo della Porta, the Vicar General of Cardinal Antonio Ciocchi del Monte, who was not residential.

=== Diocesan synods ===
A meeting, sometimes called a synodus, was held in Pavia by the Emperor Louis II, the son of Lothair I. It was also called the Conventus Ticinensis, and was presided over by Archbishop Angilbertus of Milan, the Patriarch Theodemar of Aquileia, and Bishop Joseph the Archchaplain. Twenty-four canons regarding ecclesiastical discipline were agreed upon, and five chapters concerning political matters. Immediately thereafter, the Emperor visited Rome, where he was crowned emperor by Pope Leo IV. He held two other meetings in Pavia, with the same high ecclesiastical vassals presiding, one in February 855 and the other in July 855.

Bishop Guido Langasco (1295–1311) held a diocesan synod in 1297.

A diocesan synod was held in the Cathedral Chapter house in Pavia on 16 February 1317, during the Administratorship of Giovanni Beccaria, O.Min. (1320–1324), Latin Patriarch of Antioch (Syria). The Patriarch was not present, but was rather serving at the Papal Court in Avignon, dicto domino patriarcha administratore apud sedem apostolicam existente. The synod was therefore presided over by the Patriarch's two Vicars, the Archdeacon Bonifazio de Frascarolo and Zonfredus de Castana Canon of Monza. The decisions of the synod had mostly to do with legal matters, oaths, thieves, punishments, and with the collection of the decima. Bishop Giovanni Fulgesi (1328–1342) held another synod c. 1343, with exhortations and regulations concerning the seven sacraments, burials, the preaching of indulgences, and the decima and clerical debtors.

In 1518 a diocesan synod was held, though the Administrator of the diocese, Cardinal Antonio Maria Ciocchi del Monte (1511–1521) did not attend. He did send a letter of thanks to his Vicar, Giovanni Luchini Curzio, who presided and gave the opening address. Among other matters, the synod legislated on the sons of priests, the cohabitation of clerics and women, and clerical non-residence (the clergy of the Cathedral being exempted). A diocesan synod was held by Cardinal Ippolito Rossi (1564–1591) on 14 November 1566.

On 19 July 1576, the Apostolic Visitor by the mandate of Pope Gregory XIII, Bishop Angelo Peruzzi, Auxiliary Bishop of Bologna and titular bishop of Caesarea, issued a set of decrees for the diocese of Pavia in thirty-eight chapters, on the same themes as appear regularly in diocesan statutes. These statutes, however, took account of the various decrees of the recently concluded Council of Trent. Bishop Peruzzi had previously conducted a visitation of the diocese of Modena to the satisfaction of the Pope, who then assigned him to do the same at Pavia, Piacenza, and Parma.

Bishop Giovanni Battista Biglia (1609–1617) held a synod in 1612. A synod was held by Bishop Francesco Biglia (1648–1659) in 1652.

Bishop Agostino Gaetano Riboldi (1877–1901) held a diocesan synod in Pavia on 10–12 September 1878, and had the decrees of the synod published.

The diocese's 100 parishes are all located in the (civil) region Lombardy: 97 in the Province of Pavia and 2 in the Province of Milan. There is one priest for every 1291 Catholics.

== Bishops of Pavia ==
=== To 1000 ===
- Syrus (283–339)
- Pompeius of Pavia (339–353)
- Juventius of Pavia, also Eventius, Iventius, Inventius (353–392)
- Profuturus (397–c. 401) (Note: Profuturus was consecrated by Ambrose of Milan in 397, and governed for five years.)
- Obedianus (Note: (H)obedianus is said to have governed the Church of Pavia for 14 years.)
- Urciscenus (410–433) (Note: Ursicinus (Urcesenus) is assigned a reign of 33 years.)
- Crispinus (433–466) (Note: Crispinus is explicitly called the seventh bishop of Pavia, and is said to have been bishop for 37 years. It is argued that, if Bishop Epiphanius died in 496, and he governed for 30 years, then Crispinus ruled until c. 466.)
- Epiphanius of Pavia (466–499) (Note: In 466 Epiphanius was consecrated in Milan, and from 467 to 472 he was in Rome as legate of Ricimer to Anthemius. In 495, Ennodius wrote that Epiphanius was in his 30th year as a bishop.)
- Maximus of Pavia (499–514) (Note: Maximus may be the Bishop Maximus mentioned (without the name of his diocese) in a letter from Pope Symmachus (498–514) to Archbishop Laurentius of Milan c. 501.)
- Magnus Felix Ennodius (514–521) (Note: Ennodius was ambassador of Pope Hormisdas to Constantinople on two occasions, in 515 and in 517. He died on 17 July 521.)
- Crispinus (II) (521 ? – 541)
- Paulus (c. 541 – c. 566) (Note: Paulus is said to have governed for 25 years.)
- Pompeius
- Severus
- Anastasius (ca. 658 – 680)
- Damianus (680–710) (Note: Gams gives his date of death as 12 April 708.)
- Armentarius (710–722) (Note: Armentarius engaged in a vigorous quarrel with Archbishop Benedict of Milan over the alleged right to consecrate the bishops of Pavia, and won his point.)
- Petrus (722–736)
- Theodore of Pavia (ca. 740 – 778)
- Hieronymus (778–791)

Abbot Ubaldus, O.S.B. (791–805 ?) Administrator (Note: Magani states that his administration lasted until 802.)

- Joannes (I) (813–826)
- Sebastianus
- Deodatus (Donumdei) (c. 830 – 840)
- Liutardus (Liutprandus)
- Liutfredus (864–874)
- Joannes (II) (874–911 ?) (Note: A letter of Pope John VIII of 878 states that Liutfrid had been the predecessor of Bishop John. Bishop Joannes was present at the council of Pavia held by Charles the Bald in 876. Others (e.g. Gams (1873), p. 800) assign the dates 874–879, and posit a successor, Guido, who governed from 879-884; documents after 884 are assigned to Joannes (III).)
- Joannes (III) (912-924) (Note: Others begin his episcopate in 884.)
- Leo (924–929)

...Two doubtful names follow Leo: a Saint Innocenzo and a Sigifredo.

- Liudfridus (c. 939–967)
- Pietro Canepanova (971–983) (Note: Petrus was later Pope John XIV.)
- Guido (c. 987 – 1007) (Note: Wido's earliest document is dated 2 April 987, his latest in 1007. Magani assigns the dates 984–1008.)

=== 1000 to 1500 ===
- Uberto (1008–1009 ?) (Note: Uberto, called Uberto Sacchetti by Magani, had a brief tenure. Gams gives him only one year.)
- Rainaldus (1014–1046) (Note: Schwartz notes his earliest document on 7 May 1014, and the latest on 25 October 1046.)
- Udalricus (Adalricus) (c. 1055/1057 – 1066/1067) (Note: Udalricus, also called Henricus (Astari) governed the Church of Pavia for eleven years.)
- Guilelmus (c. 1068 – 1102/1103) (Note: Guillelmus is said to have reigned for 36 years. His earliest known document is dated 17 January 1069. In February 1075 he was suspended by the Roman synod of Pope Gregory VII, and on 25 June 1080 he was present at the synod of Brixen which anathematized Pope Gregory. Pope Urban II was at Pavia in September 1096, by which time the schism must have been ended. His latest known document is dated 15 July 1100.)
- Guido (1103–1118) (Note: Guido was a member of the Pescari family, according to Magani; or the Pipari, according to Gams. His earliest known document is dated 11 July 1103, and his latest 6 July 1110. He is said to have reigned for 18 years.)
- Bernardus (c. 1119 – 1130)
- Pietro (Rosso or Rossi) (1130–1139)
- Alfano
- Pietro Toscani, O.Cist. (1148–1180) (Note: Pietro Toscani died on 21 May 1180.)
- Lanfranco Beccari (1180–1198)
- Bernardo Balbi (1198–1213)
- Rodobaldo de'Sangiorgio (1213–1215)
- Gregorio Crescenzi (1215–1216)
- Fulco Scotti (1217–1229)
- Rodobaldo Cepolla (1230–1254) (Note: On 16 June 1231, Pope Gregory IX confirmed the election of Bishop Rodobaldo by the Canons of the Cathedral; a Master Ardengo had been elected, but declined the election. Rodobaldo (Rubaldus, according to the bull) had been a Canon of the Cathedral Chapter. Rodobaldo died on 12 October 1254.)
- Guglielmo Caneti (c. 1256–1272)

Conradus Beccaria (1272–1282)

- Guido Tacio (Zazzi), O.S.B. (1272–1294)
- Otto Beccaria (1294–1295)
- Guido Langasco (1295–1311) (Note: Guido had been the Chaplain of Cardinal Gerardo Bianchi, Bishop of Sabina. His election was confirmed on 18 April 1295 by Pope Benedict VIII.)
- Isnardus Tacconi, O.P. (1311–1320) (Note: Isnardo was appointed on 5 August 1311 by Pope Clement V. He was removed in 1320.)

Giovanni Beccaria, O.Min. (1320–1324) Administrator

- Carantus Sannazaro (1326–1328)
- Giovanni Fulgesi (1328–1342)

Cardinal Gaucelmo Deuza (1342) Administrator

- Matteo Ribaldi (1342–1343) (Note: Riboldi was transferred to the diocese of Verona on 27 June 1343 by Pope Clement VI.)
- Petrus Spelta, O.Humil. (1343–1356)
- Alcherius de Montilio (1356–c.1362)
- Franciscus Sottoriva (1363–1386) (Note: Francesco was appointed by Pope Urban V on 5 May 1363. He died in 1386.)
- Guilelmus, O.Min. (1386–1402) (Note: Guilelmus was appointed by Pope Urban VI on 27 September 1386. He died in 1402.)
- Pietro Grassi (1402–1426) (Note: Fra Pietro Grassi was appointed by Pope Boniface IX on 27 September 1402. On 1 March 1403 he issued a decree, intending to suppress the abuse of exemptions and privileges which belonged to the clergy in the diocese; clerics who claimed exemption had to appear before the Bishop's Vicar General, Antonio Zeno, Doctor of Canon Law, and prove their claims. He died on 28 September 1426.)
- Francesco Piccolopasso (1427–1435) (Note: Piccolopasso was transferred from the diocese of Dax by Pope Martin V on 26 February 1427. He was transferred to the diocese of Milan on 7 June 1435. He died in 1443.)
- Enrico Rampini (1435–1446)
- Giacomo Borromeo (1446–1453)
- Giovanni Castiglione (1453–1460) (Note: Castiglione had previously been Bishop of Coutances (1444–1453). He was transferred to the diocese of Pavia by Pope Callistus III on 3 October 1453. He was named a cardinal by Pope Calixtus III on 17 December 1456, and assigned the Roman titular church of San Clemente. He died 14 April 1460.)
- Giacomo Piccolomini-Ammanati (1460–1479) (Note: Cardinal Piccolomini was appointed on 23 July 1460. He was also Bishop of Tusculum. He died on 10 September 1479.)

Sede vacante (Note: One year after the death of Cardinal Piccolomini, the Cathedral Chapter met and reconfirmed the appointment of the Archdeacon, Giovanni Matteo de Privolis, doctor of Canon Law, as the Vicar Capitular for Spiritualities.)
Ascanio Sforza (1479–1505) Administrator

=== Since 1500 ===
- Francesco Alidosius (1505–1511)

Antonio Maria Ciocchi del Monte (1511–1521) Administrator (Note: Antonio del Monte resigned on 13 March 1521, in favor of his nephew, Giovanni Maria.)

- Giovanni Maria Ciocchi del Monte (1521–1530), later Pope Julius III
- Giovanni Girolamo Rossi (1530–1541)
- Giovanni Maria Ciocchi del Monte (1544–1550) (Note: Cardinal del Monte's Vicar General was Sisto Ranuzio Sabino)
- Giovanni Girolamo Rossi (1550–1564)z (Note: Rossi assumed the See of Pavia a second time on 22 February 1550. He had a coadjutor, Bishop Ippolito Rossi. He died on 5 April 1564.)
- Ippolito de' Rossi (1564–1591) (Note: Rossi was appointed Coadjutor Bishop of Pavia on 4 September 1560 by Pope Pius IV. He became Bishop of Pavia on 5 April 1564. On 14 June 1564, as Bishop of Pavia, he changed the hierarchical structure of the Canons of the Cathedral. He died on 28 April 1591.)
- Alexander Sauli, B. (1591–1592)
- Francesco Gonzaga, O.Min.Obs. (1593) (Note: Gonzaga had been Minister General of the Observant Franciscans. He was named Bishop of Cefalù (Sicily) from 1587 to 1593. He was transferred to the diocese of Pavia on 29 January 1593, and transferred to the diocese of Mantua on 30 April 1593.)
- Guglielmo Bastoni (1593–1609)
- Giovanni Battista Biglia (1609–1617) (Note: A native of Milan, Biglia had been a Referendary of the Two Signatures, and held several governorships in the papal states.)
- Fabrizio Landriani (1617–1642)
- Giovanni Battista Sfondrati (1642–1647)
- Francesco Biglia (1648–1659)
- Girolamo Melzi (1659–1672)
- Lorenzo Trotti (1672–1700)
- Cardinal Giacomo Antonio Morigia (1701–1711)
- Agostino Cusani (1711–1724)
- Francesco Pertusati, O.S.B. (1724–1752)
- Carlo Durini (1753–1769) (Note: Born in Milan in 1693, Durini held the degree of Doctor in utroque iure (Pavia, 1714). He served as papal Governor of Spoleto, and in 1725 was made papal Governor of Benevento. In 1730 he became Vice-Governor of Fermo, and in 1732 was appointed Rector of Campania and Marittima. In 1735 he was named Inquisitor General of Malta. He became Nuncio to the Swiss in 1739, and Nuncio to the King of France in 1744. He had been Archbishop of Rhodes from 1739. He was transferred to the diocese of Pavia by Pope Benedict XIV on 23 July 1753, and permitted to retain the title Archbishop. He was named a cardinal on 26 November 1753, and assigned the Roman titular church of Santi Quattro Coronati. He died in Milan on 25 June 1769.)
- Bartolomeo Olivazzi (1769–1792)
- Giuseppe Bertieri (1792–1804)

Sede vacante (1804–1807)

- Paolo Lamberto D'Allègre (1807–1821) (Note: A native of Turin, D'Allègre was appointed Bishop of Pavia by Pope Pius VII on 18 September 1807. He died on 6 October 1821.)
- Luigi Tosi (1823–1845)

Sede vacante (1845–1850)

- Angelo Ramazzotti (1850–1858) (Note: A native of Milan, Ramazzotti was named Bishop of Pavia by Pope Pius IX on 20 May 1850. He was transferred to the diocese of Venice on 15 March 1858. He died on 24 September 1861.)
- Pietro Maria Ferré (1860–1867)

Sede vacante (1867–1871)

- Lucido Maria Parocchi (1871–1877)
- Agostino Gaetano Riboldi (1877–1901)
- Francesco Ciceri (1901–1924)
- Giuseppe Ballerini (1924–1933)
- Giovanni Battista Girardi (1934–1942)
- Carlo Allorio (1942–1968)
- Antonio Giuseppe Angioni (1968–1986)
- Giovanni Volta (1986–2003)
- Giovanni Giudici (2003–2015) (Note: Bishop Giudici was born in Varese in 1940. In 1957–1958 he studied in the USA. He was ordained in 1964, and was Secretary of Cardinal Giovanni Colombo of Milan for three years. He taught at the diocesan seminary, and was an assistant for youth in Azione Cattolica in the diocese of Milan (1971–1972). He was a parish priest in Milan, and became Dean and Episcopal Vicar. He was named auxiliary bishop, and was consecrated on 29 June 1990 by Cardinal Carlo Maria Montini. On 11 January 2004 he was installed as Bishop of Pavia. On 16 November 2015, he resigned, and was named Apostolic Administrator, pending the appointment of a new bishop.)
- Corrado Sanguineti (2015–present)

== See also ==
- Timeline of Pavia
- Boethius

== Books ==
- Schwartz, Gerhard (1907). Die Besetzung der Bistümer Reichsitaliens unter den sächsischen und salischen Kaisern: mit den Listen der Bischöfe, 951-1122 (in German). Leipzig: B.G. Teubner.

=== Books in Italian ===
- Beltrami, Luca (1896). Storia documentata della Certosa di Pavia. Vol. I. Milan: Ulrico Hoepli.
- Bosisio, Giovanni (1858). Notizie storiche del tempio cattedrale di Pavia dalla sua origine sino all'anno 1857. Pavia: Fratelli Fusi.
- Bosisio, Giovanni (1859). Documenti inediti della chiesa Pavese. Pavia: Fratelli Fusi.
- Cappelletti, Giuseppe (1857). Le chiese d'Italia: dalla loro origine sino ai nostri giorni : opera. Vol. XII. Venice: G. Antonelli.
- Bullough, D. A. (1969). "I vescovi di Pavia nei secoli ottavo e nono: fonti e cronologia," in: Pavia capitale del regno, pp. 317–328.
- Caprioli, Adriano; Antonio Rimoldi; Luciano Vaccaro (edd.) (1995). La diocesi di Pavia. Storia Religiosa di Lombardia, 11. Brescia: La Scuola.
- Capsoni, Siro Severino (1769). Origine, e privilegj della Chiesa pavese aggiuntavi la serie cronologica de' vescovi di essa. Pavia: Giuseppe Bolzani.
- Compendio storico della cattedrale di Pavia dalla sua fondazione sino al presente. Pavia: Bizzoni. 1837.
- Dell'Acqui, Carlo (1869). Il comune e la provincia di Pavia. Milan: Vallardi.
- Lanzoni, Francesco (1927). Le diocesi d'Italia dalle origini al principio del secolo VII (an. 604). Faenza: F. Lega.
- Magani, Francesco (1894). Cronotassi dei vescovi di Pavia. Pavia: Istituto Artigianelli.
- Majocchi, Piero; Montanari, Mirella (2002). I vescovi dell'Italia settentrionale nel basso Medioevo: cronotassi per le diocesi di Cremona, Pavia e Tortona nei secoli XIV e XV. Università di Pavia. ISBN 978-88-7963-140-2.
- Malaspina, Luigi (1832). Lettera intorno alla Cattedrale di Pavia. Milan: Typ. Classici Italiani.
- Pavia capitale del regno: Atti del 4o Congresso internazionale di studi sull'alto medioevo (Pavia-Scaldasole-Monza-Bobbio, 10–14 settembre 1967). Spoleto: Centro Italiano di Studi sull'Alto Medioevo, 1969.

=== Books in Latin ===
- Bosisio, Giovanni (1852). Concilia Papiensia, Constitutiones Synodales et Decreta Dioecesana ... Fratres Fusi.
- Gams, Pius Bonifatius (1873). Series episcoporum Ecclesiae catholicae: quotquot innotuerunt a beato Petro apostolo. Regensburg: Georgii Josephi Manz.
- Kehr, Paul Fridolin (1913). Italia pontificia: sive, Repertorium privilegiorum et litterarum a romanis pontificibus ante annum 1598 Italiae ecclesiis, monasteriis, civitatibus singulisque personis concessorum. Vol. VI–I. Berlin: Weidmann.
- Ughelli, Ferdinando; Coleti, Niccolo (1717). Italia sacra sive de Episcopis Italiae. Vol. I. Venice: Apud Sebastianum Coleti.

Hierarchia catholica

- Eubel, Conradus, ed. (1913). Hierarchia catholica Medii Aevi (1198-1431). Vol. I (2nd ed.). Münster: Libreria Regensbergiana.
- Eubel, Conradus, ed. (1914). Hierarchia catholica Medii Aevi (1431-1503). Vol. II (2nd ed.). Münster: Libreria Regensbergiana.
- Eubel, Conradus, ed. (1923). Hierarchia catholica Medii Aevi (1504-1591). Vol. III (2nd ed.). Münster: Libreria Regensbergiana.
- Gauchat, Patritius (1935). Hierarchia catholica (1592-1667). Vol. IV. Münster: Libraria Regensbergiana.
- Ritzler, Remigius; Sefrin, Pirminus, eds. (1952). Hierarchia catholica medii et recentis aevi (1667-1730). Vol. V. Padua: Il Messagero di S. Antonio.
- Ritzler, Remigius; Sefrin, Pirminus, eds. (1958). Hierarchia catholica medii et recentis aevi (1730-1799). Vol. VI. Padua: Il Messagero di S. Antonio.
- Ritzler, Remigius; Sefrin, Pirminus, eds. (1968). Hierarchia Catholica medii et recentioris aevi (1800-1846). Vol. VII. Münster: Libraria Regensbergiana.
- Ritzler, Remigius; Sefrin, Pirminus, eds. (1978). Hierarchia catholica Medii et recentioris aevi (1846-1903). Vol. VIII. Padua: Il Messaggero di S. Antonio.
- Pięta, Zenon, ed. (2002). Hierarchia catholica medii et recentioris aevi (1903-1922). Vol. IX. Padua: Il Messagero di San Antonio. ISBN 9788825010008.
