= John of Pavia =

Italian Roman Catholic saint

Saint John

Bishop of Pavia
- Died: 813
- Venerated in: Roman Catholic Church Eastern Orthodox Church
- Canonized: Pre-congregation
- Feast: 27 August (Roman Catholic and Eastern Orthodox)

Saint John of Pavia was Bishop of Pavia between 801–813. He is venerated as a saint in the Roman Catholic Church and in the Eastern Orthodox Church, both give him a feast day on 27 August.
