= Giovanni Battista Sfondrati =

17th-century Roman Catholic bishop

Most Reverend Giovanni Battista Sfondrati
- Bishop of Pavia
- Church: Catholic Church
- Diocese: Diocese of Pavia
- In office: 1642–1647
- Predecessor: Fabrizio Landriani
- Successor: Francesco Biglia

Orders
- Consecration: 14 Dec 1642 by Giulio Roma

Personal details
- Died: 1647

Giovanni Battista Sfondrati (died 1647) was a Roman Catholic prelate who served as Bishop of Pavia (1642–1647).

== Biography ==
On 1 Dec 1642, Giovanni Battista Sfondrati was appointed during the papacy of Pope Urban VIII as Bishop of Pavia. On 14 Dec 1642, he was consecrated bishop by Giulio Roma, Bishop of Tivoli, with Lelio Falconieri, Titular Archbishop of Thebae, and Giovanni Battista Altieri (seniore), Bishop Emeritus of Camerino, serving as co-consecrators. He served as Bishop of Pavia until his death in 1647.

== External links and additional sources ==
- Cheney, David M. "Diocese of Pavia". Catholic-Hierarchy.org. (for Chronology of Bishops) ^{[self-published]}
- Chow, Gabriel. "Diocese of Pavia (Italy)". GCatholic.org. (for Chronology of Bishops) ^{[self-published]}

Catholic Church titles
Preceded by Fabrizio Landriani	Bishop of Pavia; 1642–1647	Succeeded by Francesco Biglia
