= Girolamo Melzi =

1xth-century Roman Catholic bishop

Most Reverend Girolamo Melzi
- Bishop of Pavia
- Church: Catholic Church
- Diocese: Diocese of Pavia
- Predecessor: Francesco Biglia
- Successor: Lorenzo Trotti

Orders
- Ordination: 21 Sep 1659
- Consecration: 16 Nov 1659 by Giacomo Corradi

Personal details
- Born: 1599 Milan, Italy
- Died: 29 Sep 1672 (age 73) Pavia, Italy

Girolamo Melzi (1599–1672) was a Roman Catholic prelate who served as Bishop of Pavia (1659–1672).

== Biography ==
Girolamo Melzi was born in 1599 and ordained a priest on 21 Sep 1659. On 22 Sep 1659, he was appointed during the papacy of Pope Alexander VII as Bishop of Pavia. On 16 Nov 1659, he was consecrated bishop by Giacomo Corradi, Cardinal-Priest of Santa Maria in Traspontina, with Marco Antonio Tomati, Bishop Emeritus of Bitetto, and Marcantonio Oddi, Bishop of Perugia, serving as co-consecrators. He served as Bishop of Pavia until his death on 29 Sep 1672.

== External links and additional sources ==
- Cheney, David M. "Diocese of Pavia". Catholic-Hierarchy.org. (for Chronology of Bishops) ^{[self-published]}
- Chow, Gabriel. "Diocese of Pavia (Italy)". GCatholic.org. (for Chronology of Bishops) ^{[self-published]}

Catholic Church titles
| Preceded by Francesco Biglia | Bishop of Pavia; 1659–1672 | Succeeded by Lorenzo Trotti |
