= Crispin of Pavia =

Italian Roman Catholic saint

Saint Crispin

Bishop of Pavia
- Venerated in: Roman Catholic Church, Orthodox Church
- Canonized: Pre-congregation
- Feast: 7 January

Crispin of Pavia (died 7 January 467) was Bishop of Pavia in the 5th century during the reign of Pope Leo I (440 – 461). He was among the 20 bishops from Northern Italy who attended the Synod of Milan in 451.
