= Mansuetus (bishop of Milan) =

Italian bishop and saint

- Archbishop of Milan
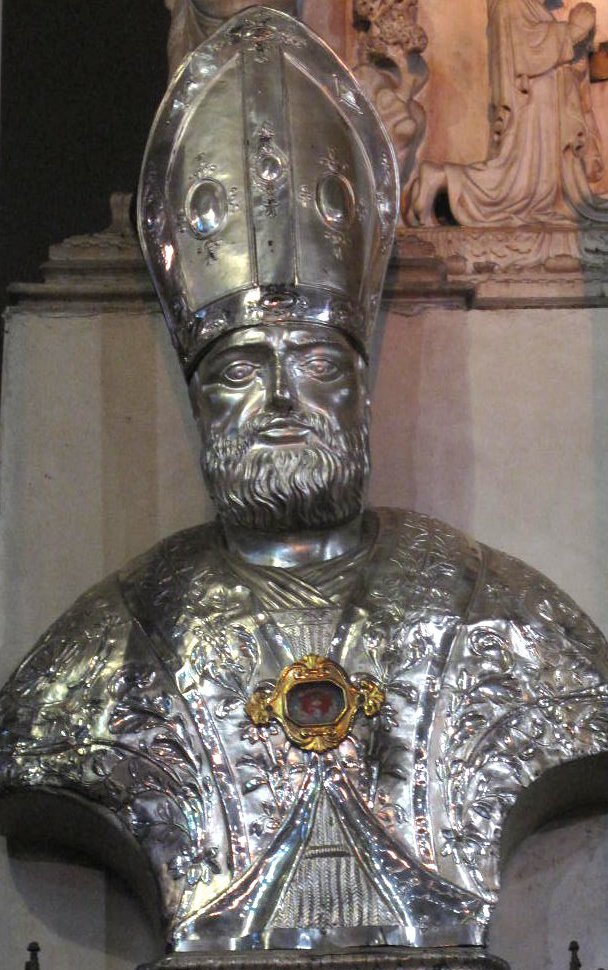
- Church: Catholic Church
- Appointed: 676
- Term ended: 685
- Predecessor: Ampelius
- Successor: Benedict

Personal details
- Died: 19 February probably of 685

Sainthood
- Feast day: February 19
- Venerated in: Catholic Church

Mansuetus (Latin: Mansuetus, Italian: Mansueto) was Archbishop of Milan from 676 to 685. He is honoured as a saint in the Catholic Church.

== Life ==
Among the scant information about his life, it is known that in 679 he organized and held a synod with his suffragan bishops in Milan in order to condemn the Monothelite doctrine. According to Paul the Deacon this synod issued a letter, written by a Damian later bishop of Pavia, directly to Emperor Constantine IV. A year later Mansuetus and his suffragan bishops participated in Rome to a synod opened by Pope Agatho on 27 march 680 and subscribed the acts there issued. This 680 Rome synod was held in preparation of the Third Council of Constantinople, which a few months later condemned the Monothelitism.

Mansuetus died on 19 February probably of 685. His remains were buried in the Basilica of Sant'Ambrogio, but were later translated to the Basilica di Santo Stefano Maggiore and again in 1987 to South transept of the Milan Cathedral.

His feast day is February 19 in the Roman Rite and September 2 in the Ambrosian Rite. A late tradition, with no historical basis, associates Mansuetus with the Roman family of the Savelli.
