= Syrus of Pavia =

Roman Catholic Saint

Saint Syrus of Pavia
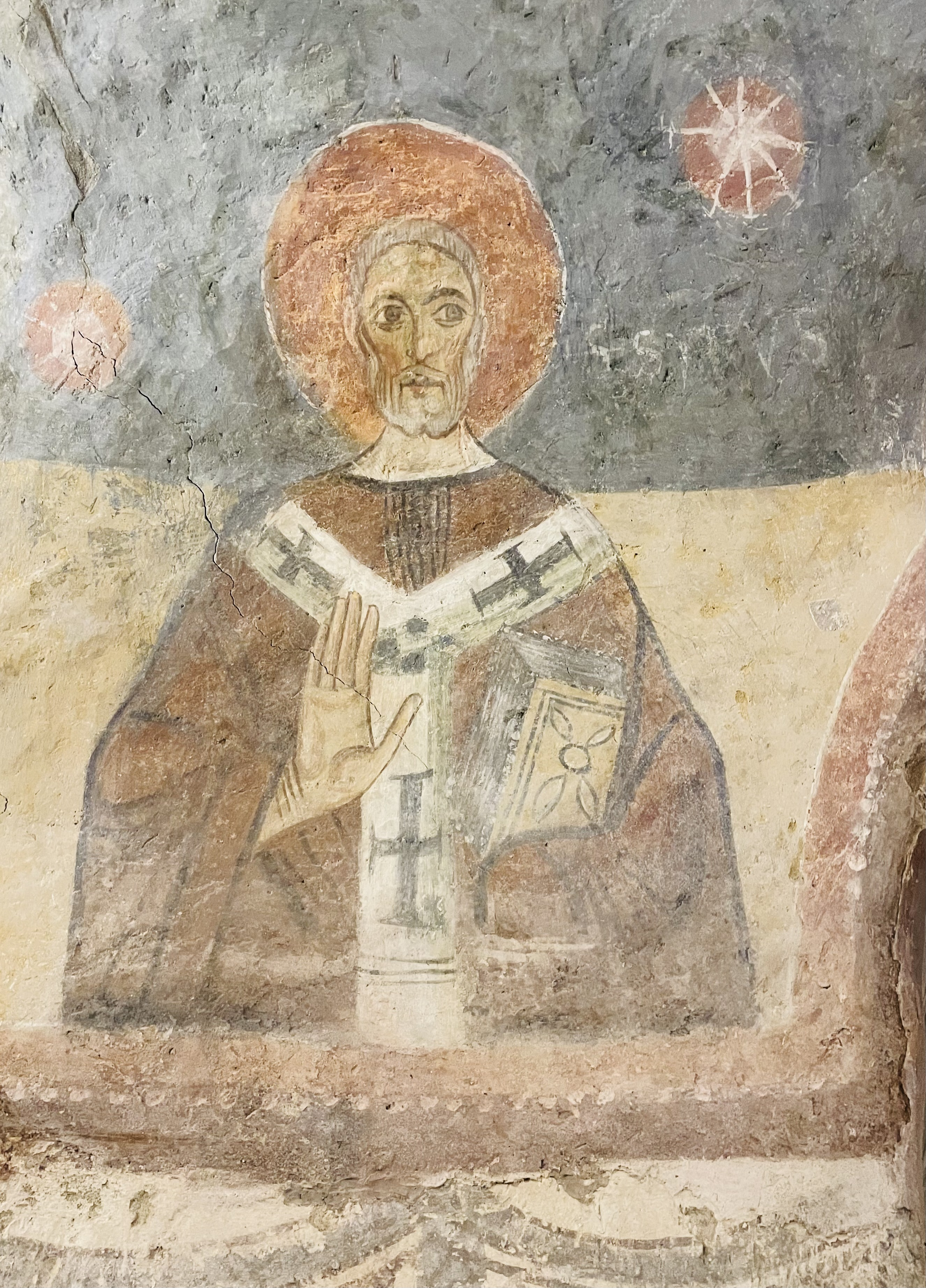
- Fresco depicting Syrus of Pavia, 12th century, church of San Giovanni Domnarum, Pavia
- Died: ~376 AD
- Venerated in: Catholic Church
- Major shrine: Pavia
- Feast: December 9
- Attributes: bishop trampling a basilisk (symbol of Arianism) underfoot; bishop enthroned between two deacons; with Saint Juventius
- Patronage: Pavia

Syrus of Pavia (Italian: San Siro di Pavia), also spelled Sirus, is traditionally said to have been the first bishop of Pavia during the 4th century.

His legend, according to the 14th century source known as the De laudibus Papiæ (In the Praise of Pavia), states that Syrus was the boy with the five loaves who appears in the Gospels. As Hippolyte Delehaye writes, "To have lived amongst the Saviour's immediate following was...honorable...and accordingly old patrons of churches were identified with certain persons in the gospels or who were supposed to have had some part of Christ's life on earth." Syrus is said to have followed Peter to Rome and from there he was sent to the Po Valley to preach and convert the people to the Christian faith. He preached in all of the major cities of northern Italy.

Another tradition, dating back to the 8th century, makes Syrus a disciple of Hermagoras, who in turn was the disciple of Mark the Evangelist. Hermagoras was the founder of the diocese of Aquileia. Together with Juventius of Pavia, he was sent there by Hermagoras. Both Juventius and Syrus are reported to have been the first bishops of Pavia. Syrus worked to challenge and convert those who followed Arianism in his diocese.

== Veneration ==
Syrus is the patron saint of Pavia. Bramante designed the chapel of San Siro in the city's cathedral, which contains the saint's relics.

== Notes ==
- Hippolyte Delehaye, The Legends of the Saints (Dublin, Four Courts Press, 1955), 37.
- N. Everett, "The Earliest recension of the Life of S. Sirus of Pavia (Vat. lat. 5771)", Studi Medievali 43 (2002), 857-957 (Latin text, Eng. trans., commentary).
- N.Everett, Patron Saints of Early Medieval Italy AD c.350-800. History and Hagiography in Ten Biographies. PIMS / Durham University Press, 2016.
