= Juventius of Pavia =

Saint Iuventius
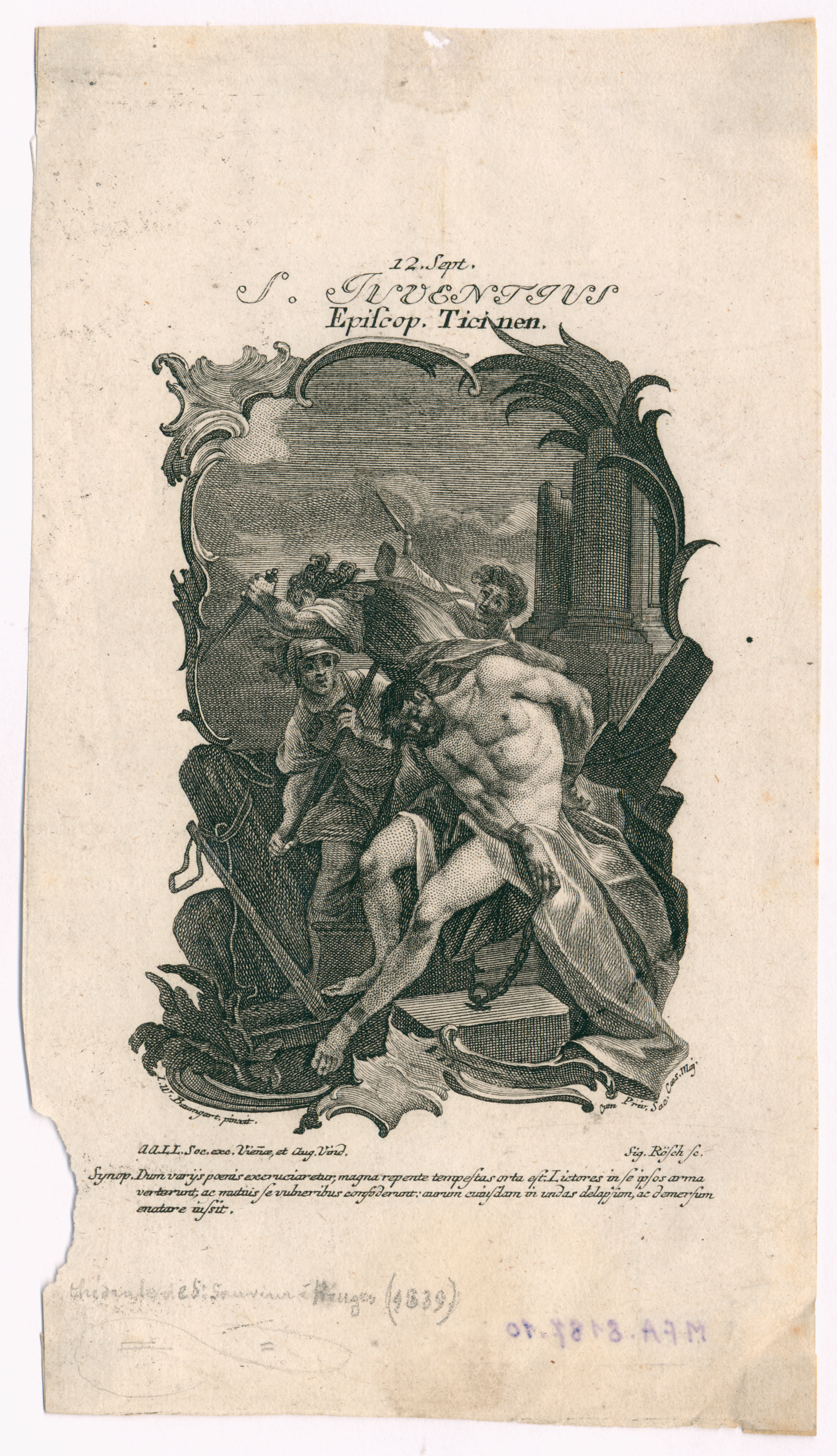

Bishop of Pavia
- Died: 8 February 397
- Venerated in: Roman Catholic Church
- Canonized: Pre-congregation
- Feast: 8 February 12 September (along with St. Syrus)

Saint Juventius (died 8 February 397), sometimes spelled Eventius, Iventius, or Inventius, was a bishop of Pavia during the 4th century, holding the position for 39 years. Together with Syrus of Pavia, he was sent to Pavia by Saint Hermagoras to evangelize the city, founding a bishopric there. Syrus subsequently served as first bishop of Pavia.

Juventius has two feast days, 8 February alone and 12 September together with Syrus.
