= Peter I (bishop of Pavia) =

Italian Roman Catholic saint

Saint Peter

Bishop of Pavia
- Died: 735 AD
- Venerated in: Roman Catholic Church; Eastern Orthodox Church
- Canonized: Pre-congregation
- Feast: 7 May

Peter of Pavia was a Lombard who was Bishop of Pavia, during the reign of the Lombard king Liutprand, his nephew.

In the Middle Ages the city of Pavia was the capital of the Lombard Kingdom which St. Peter served, and later home to one of the earliest and most illustrious universities in Europe.

According to Venerable Bede, the body of St. Augustine of Hippo was removed to Cagliari, Sardinia by the Catholic bishops whom the Arian king of the Vandals Huneric had expelled from north Africa. Bede tells that the remains were subsequently redeemed out of the hands of the Saracens, at a cost of sixty thousand gold crowns, by Peter. After shipment to Genoa, they were then deposited in the Basilica of San Pietro in Ciel d'Oro ("St. Peter in Golden Sky"), about the year 720.
