= Damian of Pavia =

Italian Roman Catholic saint

Saint Damian

Bishop of Pavia
- Died: 710
- Venerated in: Roman Catholic Church
- Canonized: Pre-congregation
- Feast: 12 April

Damian of Pavia (also Damianus Ticinensis, Damianus Mediolanensis, Damianus Biscossia) was Bishop of Pavia (Ticinum) from 680, succeeding bishop Anastasius. He mediated relations between the Lombards and the Byzantine emperors.

Damian wrote a letter to emperor Constantine IV in 679 on behalf of Mansuetus, archbishop of Milan, against the doctrine of Monothelitism. This letter, in a Latin edition, is the only extant writing from the hand of Damian (sometimes attributed to Mansuetus on whose behalf Damian was writing).
