= Ampelius (bishop of Milan) =

Italian Roman Catholic saint

- Archbishop of Milan
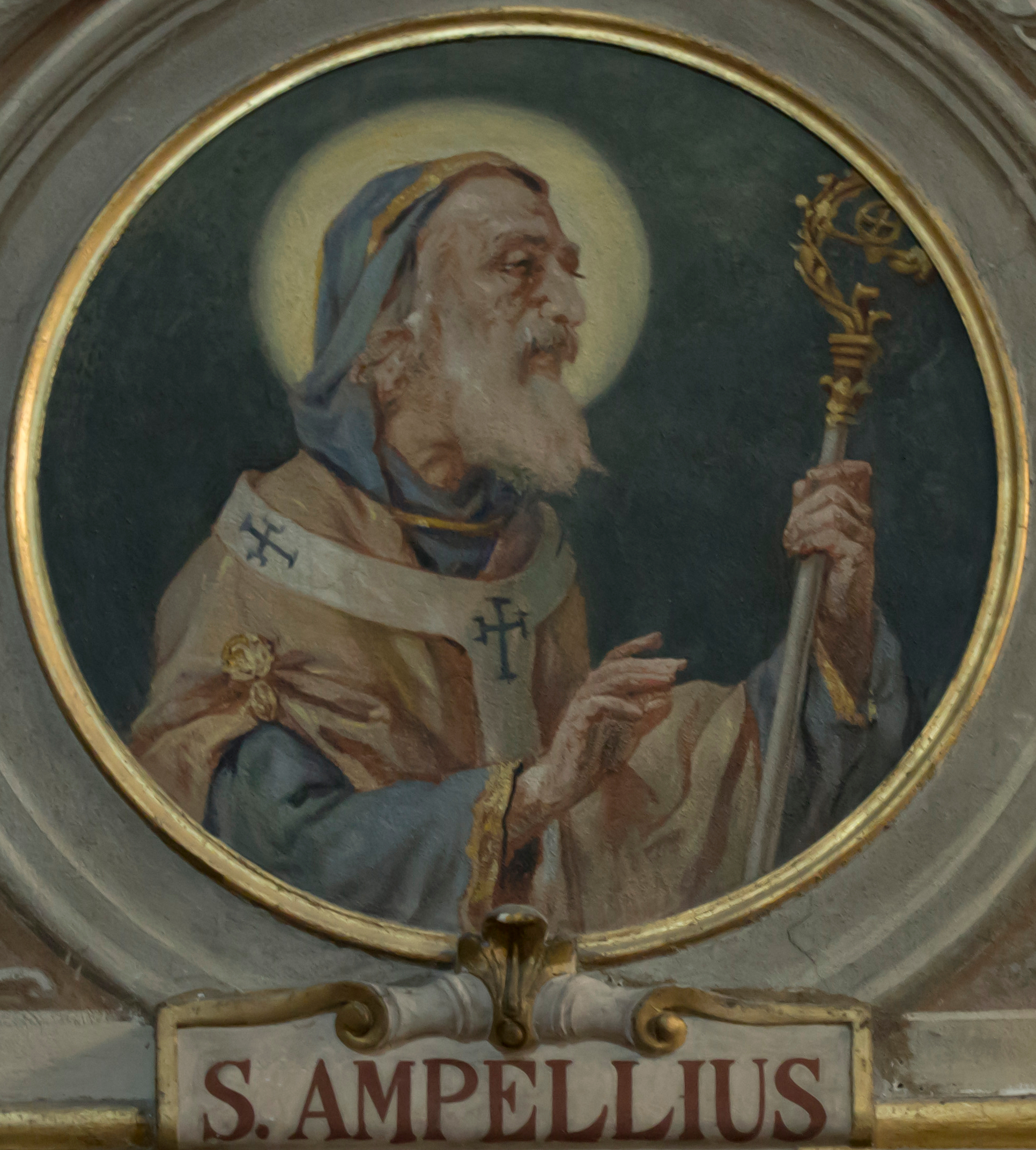
- Church: Roman Catholic Church
- Appointed: 671
- Term ended: 676
- Predecessor: Maurilius
- Successor: Mansuetus

Personal details
- Died: 676

Sainthood
- Feast day: July 7
- Venerated in: Roman Catholic Church

Ampelius (Latin: Ampelius, Italian: Ampelio) was Archbishop of Milan from 671 to 676. He is honoured as a saint in the Catholic Church.

== Life ==
Almost nothing is known about the life and the episcopate of Ampelius. He ruled the diocese of Milan in a period marked by the troubles due to the Lombards. Ampelius is remembered as man able to do miracles, but we have no detail about his acts.

Goffredo da Bussero in the 15th century informs us that his feast day was the 8 February, possibly the date of his death. His feast day is now celebrated on July 7 in the Roman Rite and on July 8 in the Ambrosian Rite. He was buried in the Basilica of St. Simplician where his relics are still venerated under the main altar.
