= Cardinals created by Paul V =

Catholic appointments from 1605 to 1621

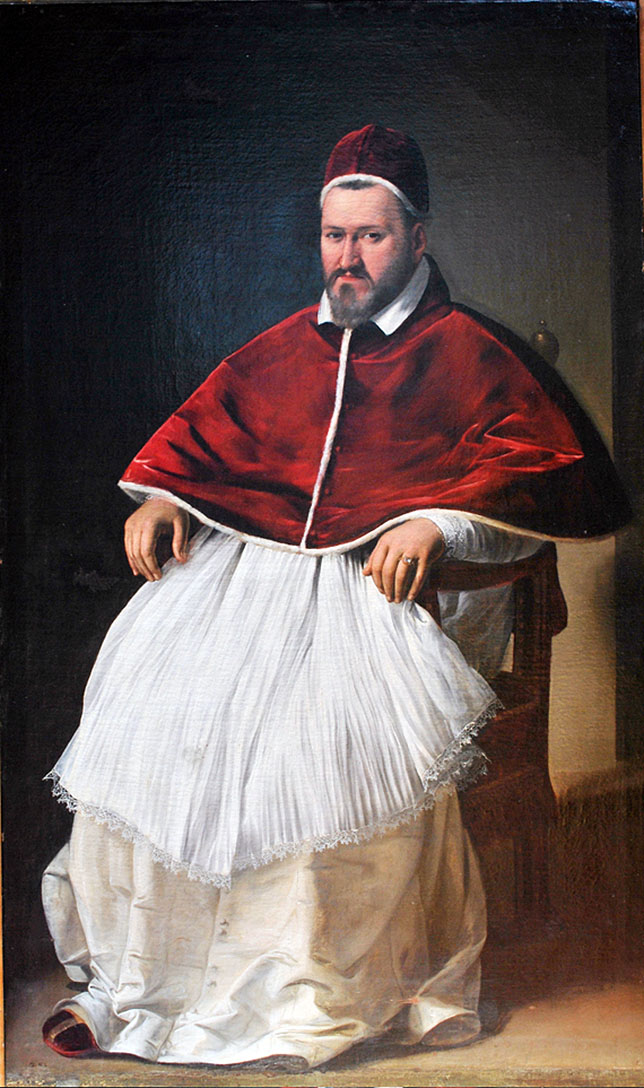
Pope Paul V (1552–1621).

Pope Paul V (r. 1605–1621) created 60 cardinals in ten consistories.

== 18 July 1605 ==
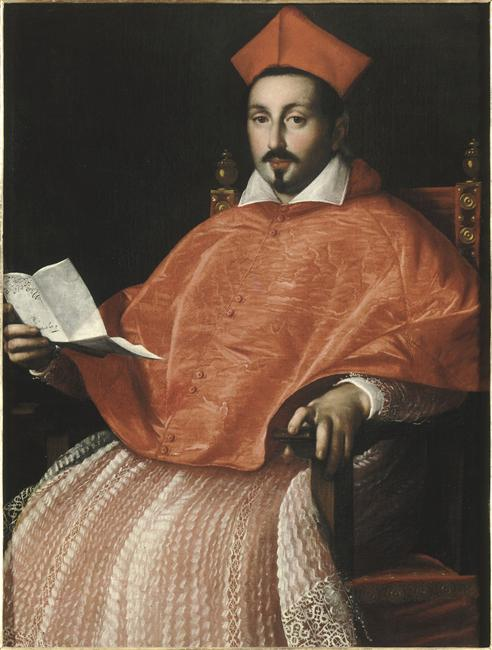
Scipione Borghese (1577–1633), made a cardinal on July 18, 1605

1. Scipione Borghese

== 11 September 1606 ==
1. Ludovico de Torres
2. Orazio Spinola
3. Maffeo Barberini
4. Giovanni Garzia Millini
5. Bartolomeo Ferratini
6. Bonifazio Caetani
7. Marcello Lante della Rovere
8. Orazio Maffei

== 10 December 1607 ==
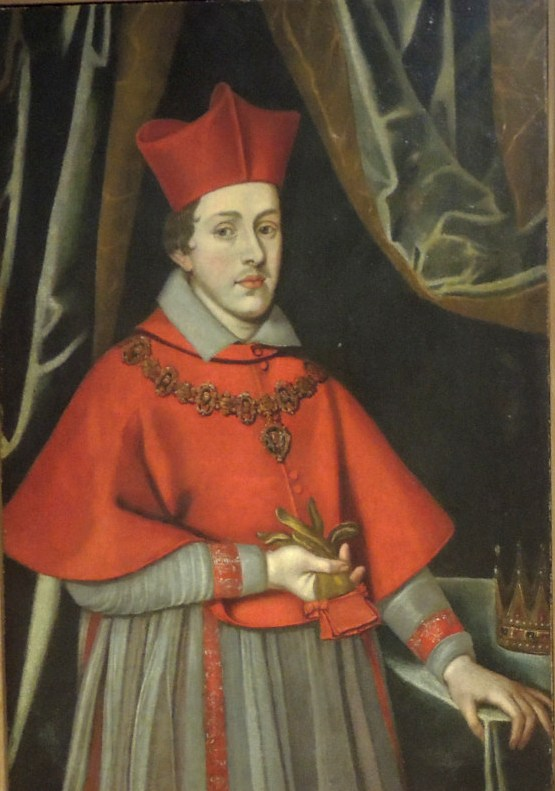
Ferdinando Gonzaga (1587–1626), made a cardinal on December 10, 1607

1. Ferenc Forgách
2. François de La Rochefoucauld
3. Jerónimo Xavierre
4. Prince Maurice of Savoy
5. Ferdinando Gonzaga

== 24 November 1608 ==
1. Michelangelo Tonti
2. Fabrizio Verallo
3. Giambattista Leni
4. Lanfranco Margotti
5. Luigi Capponi

== 17 August 1611 ==
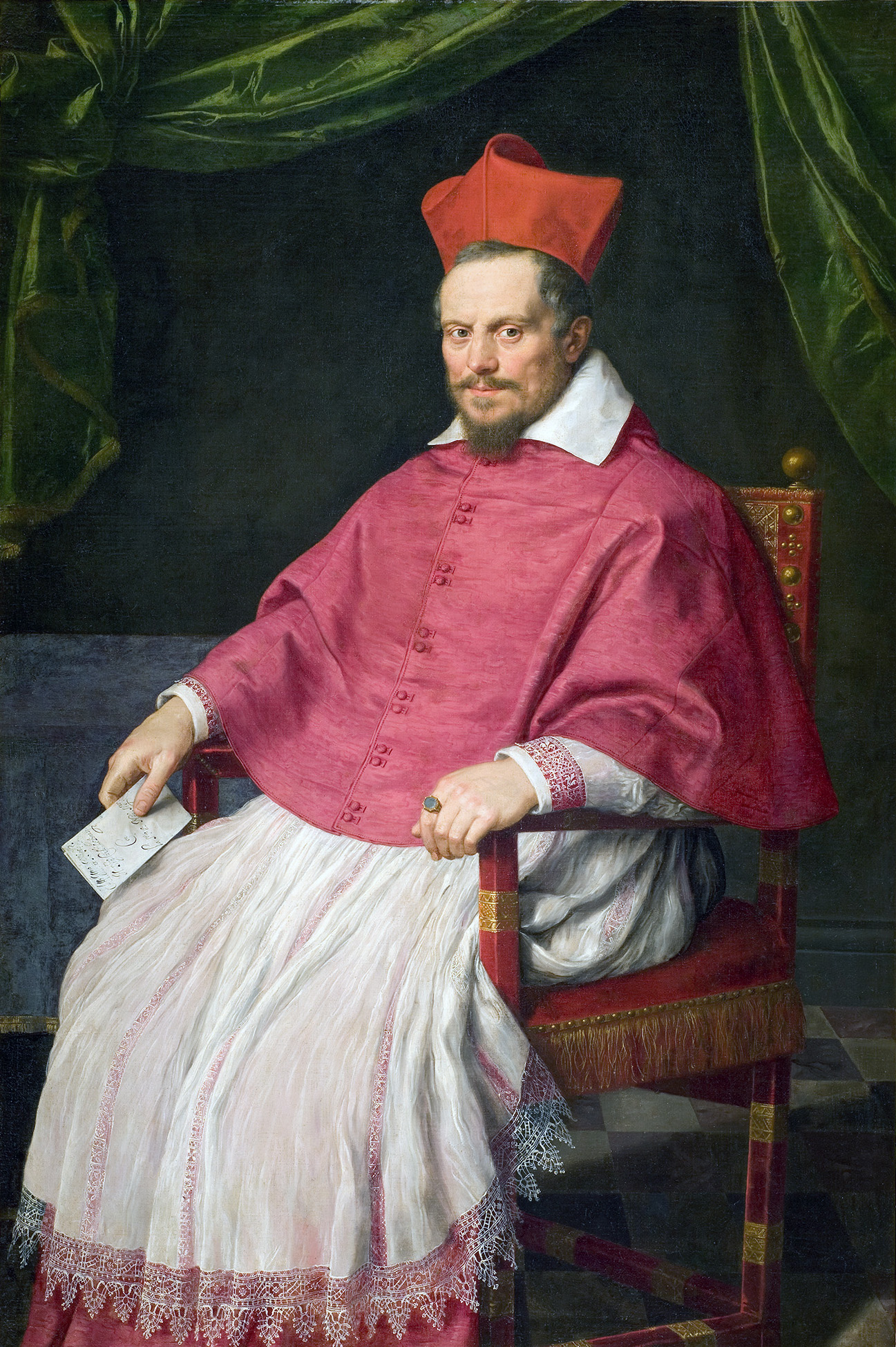
Jean de Bonsi (1554–1621), made a cardinal on August 17, 1611

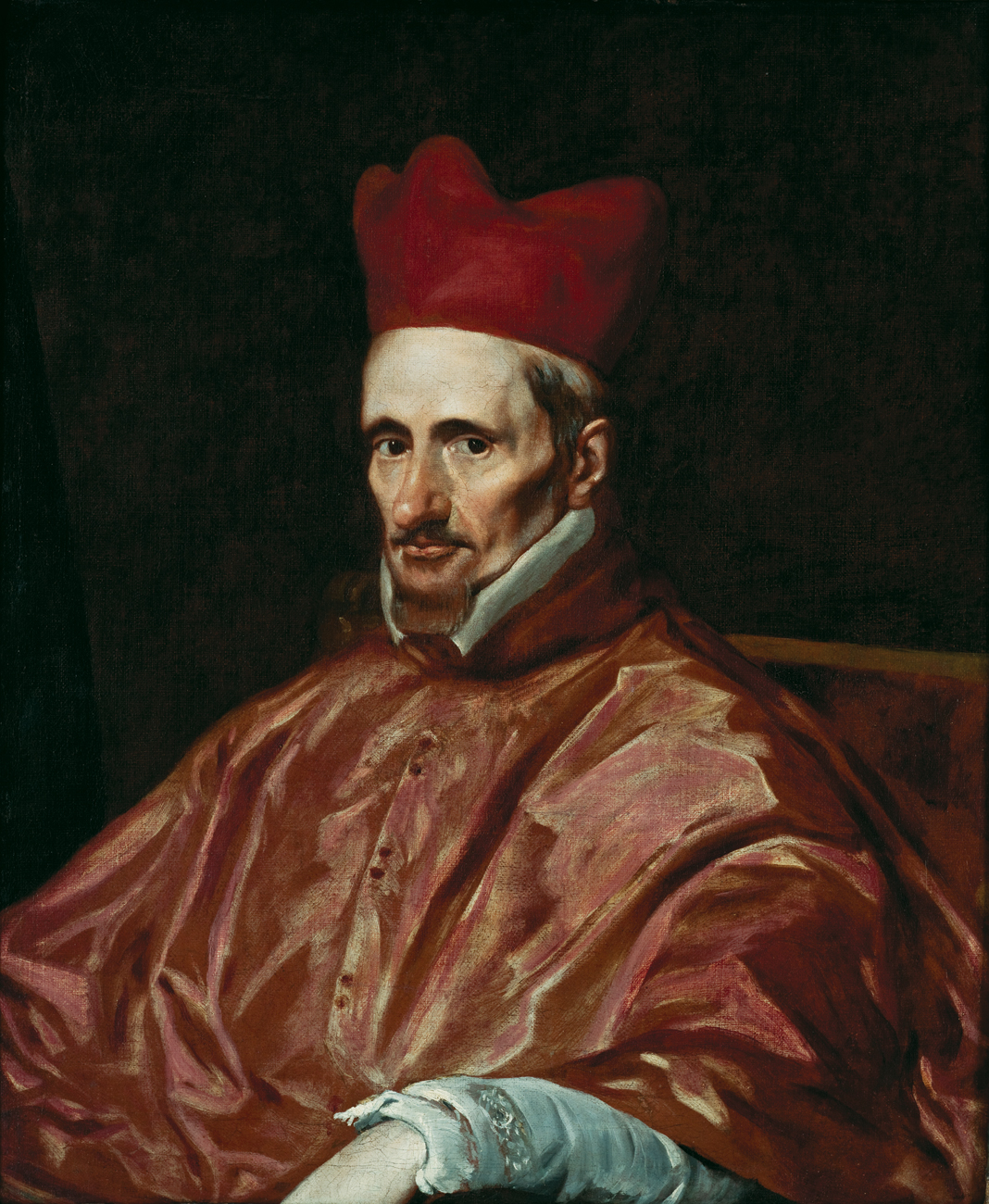
Gaspar de Borja y Velasco (1580–1645), made a cardinal on August 17, 1611

1. Decio Carafa
2. Domenico Rivarola
3. Metello Bichi
4. Jean de Bonsi
5. Filippo Filonardi
6. Pier Paolo Crescenzi
7. Giacomo Serra
8. Orazio Lancellotti
9. Agostino Galamini
10. Gaspar de Borja y Velasco
11. Felice Centini

== 2 December 1615 ==
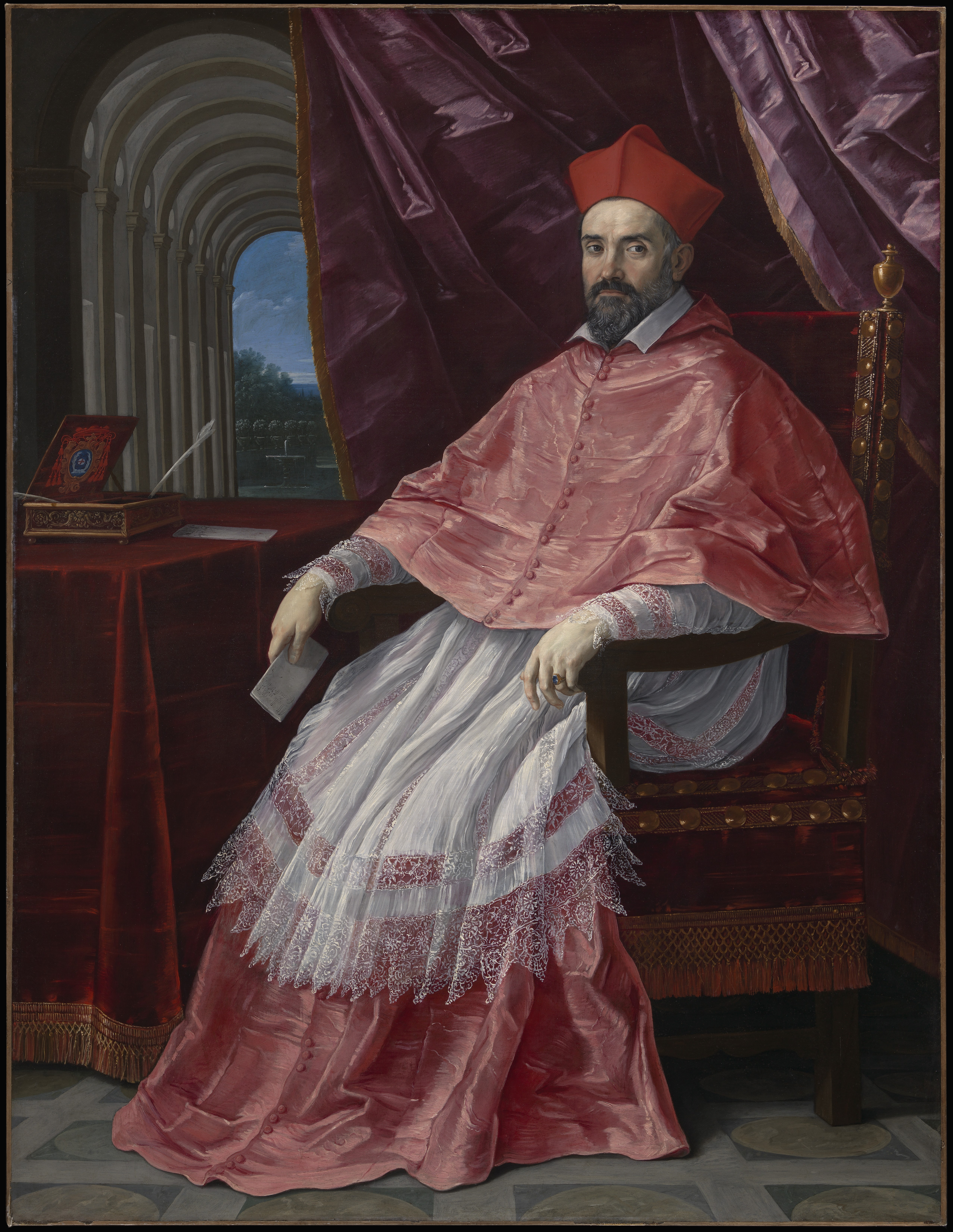
Roberto Ubaldini (1581–1635), made a cardinal on December 2, 1615

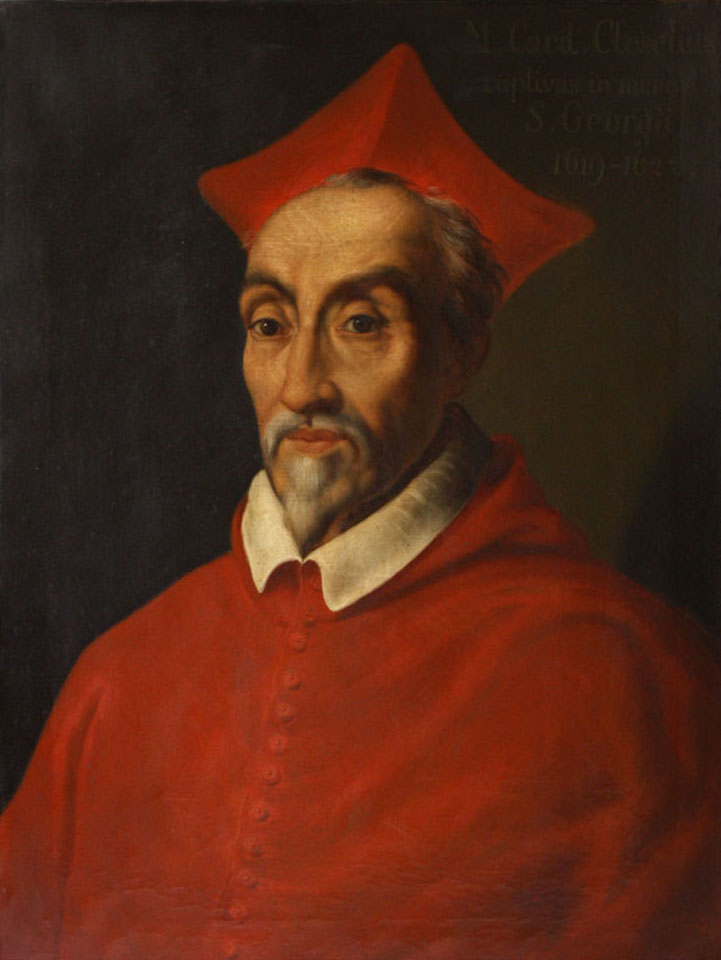
Melchior Klesl (1552–1630), made a cardinal on December 2, 1615

1. Francesco Vendramino
2. Louis of Guise
3. Roberto Ubaldini
4. Tiberio Muti
5. Gabriel Trejo Paniagua
6. Baltasar Moscoso y Sandoval
7. Carlo de' Medici
8. Vincenzo Gonzaga
9. Giulio Savelli
10. Alessandro Orsini
11. Melchior Klesl

== 19 September 1616 ==
1. Alessandro Ludovisi
2. Ladislao d'Aquino
3. Ottavio Belmosto
4. Pietro Campori
5. Matteo Priuli
6. Scipione Cobelluzzi

== 26 March 1618 ==
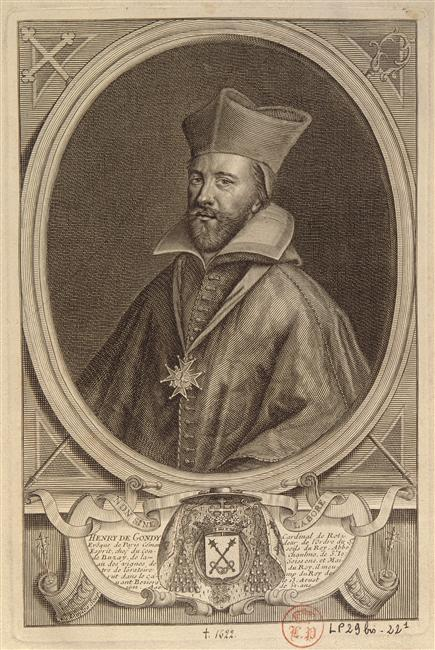
Henri de Gondi (1572–1622), made a cardinal on March 26, 1618

1. Henri de Gondi
2. Francisco Gómez de Sandoval, 1st Duke of Lerma

== 29 July 1619 ==
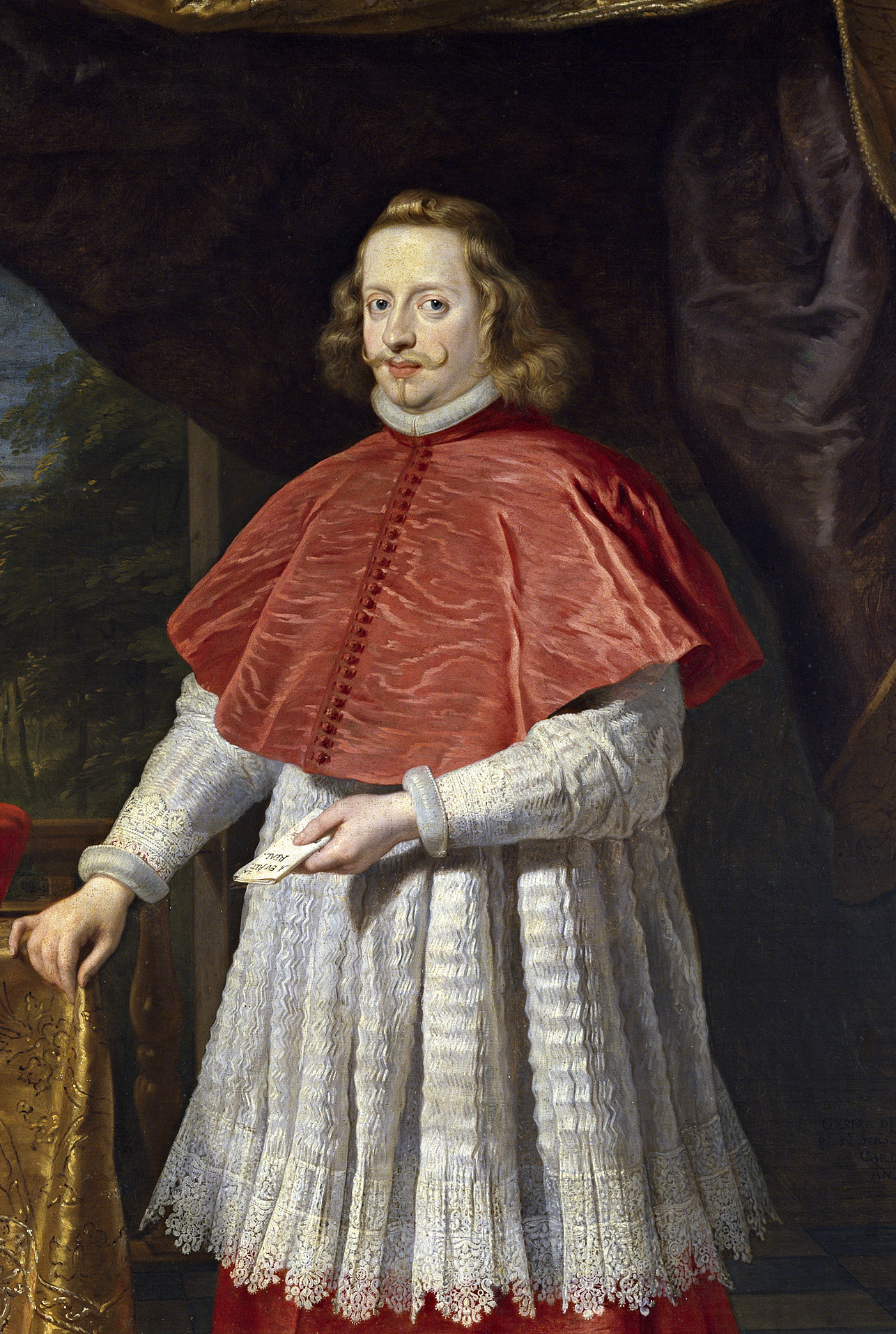
Ferdinand of Austria (1610-41), made a cardinal on July 29, 1619

1. Ferdinand of Austria

== 11 January 1621 ==
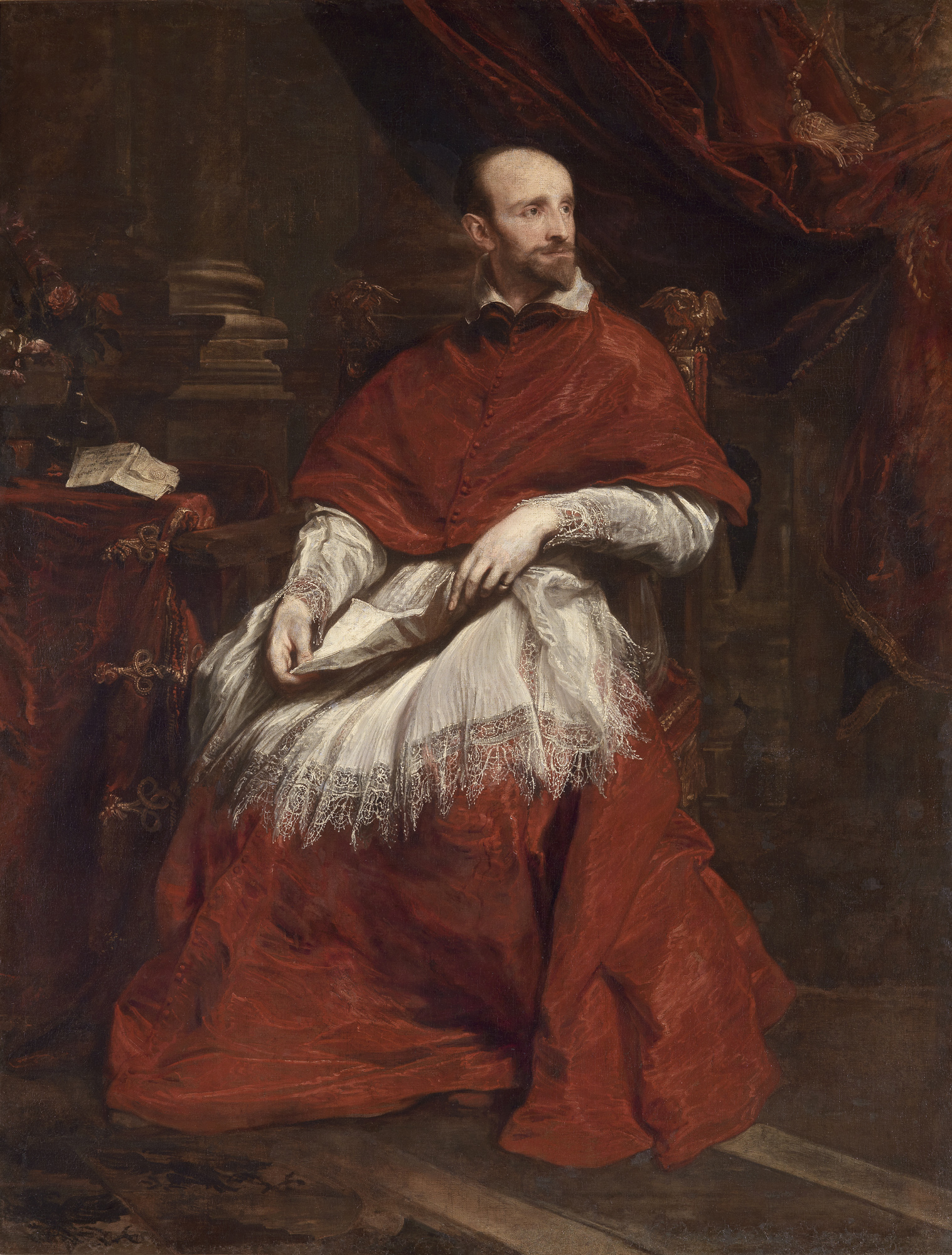
Guido Bentivoglio (1579–1644), made a cardinal on January 11, 1621

1. Francesco Cennini de' Salamandri
2. Guido Bentivoglio
3. Pietro Valier
4. Eitel Frederick von Hohenzollern-Sigmaringen
5. Louis de Nogaret de La Valette
6. Giulio Roma
7. Cesare Gherardi
8. Desiderio Scaglia
9. Stefano Pignatelli
10. Agustín de Spínola Basadone
