= 1621 conclave =

Election of Catholic Pope Gregory XV

Papal conclave February 1621

Dates and location
- 8–9 February 1621; Apostolic Palace, Papal States

Elected pope
- Alessandro Ludovisi; Name taken: Gregory XV
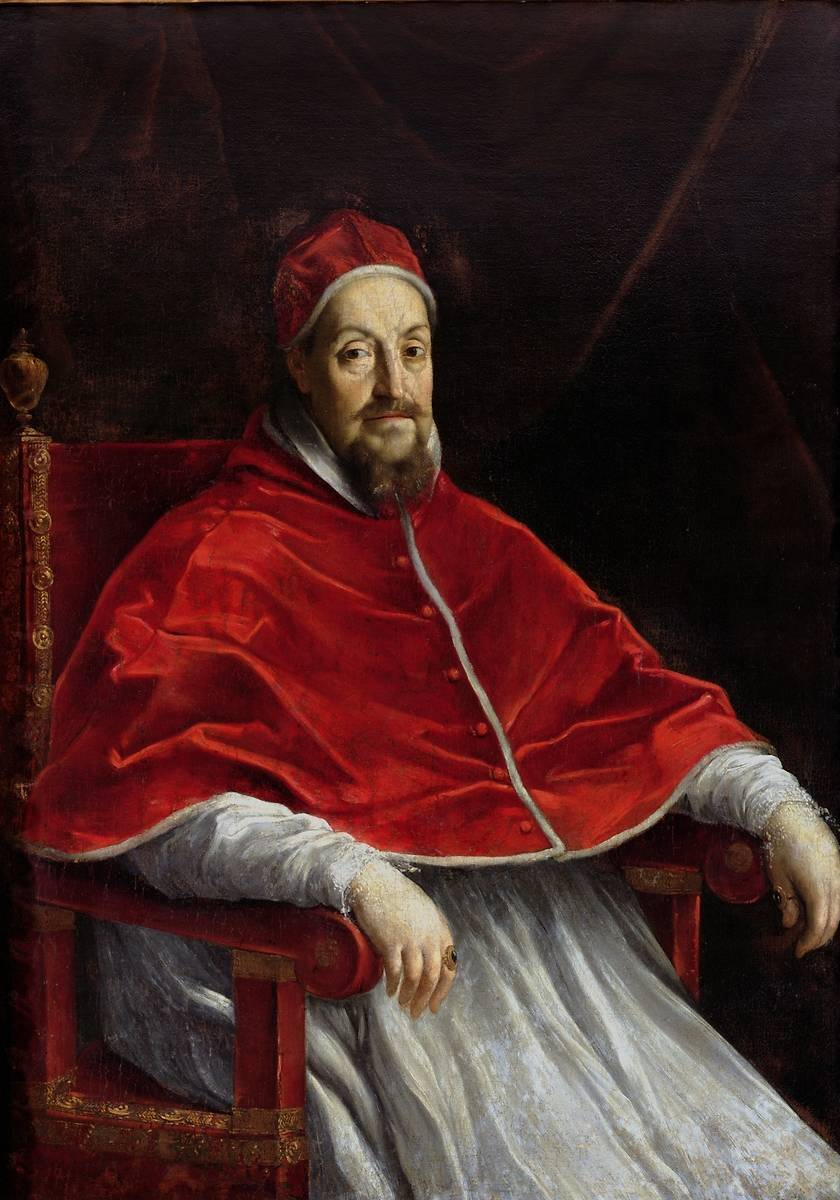

The 1621 papal conclave held from 8 to 9 February 1621, Cardinal Alessandro Ludovisi was elected to succeed Paul V as pope. Ludovisi took the name Gregory XV. It was the shortest conclave in the seventeenth century.

== Death of Paul V ==
Pope Paul V died on January 28, 1621, in the 16th year of his pontificate. At the time of his death, there were seventy cardinals in the Sacred College, but only sixty nine were valid electors. Fifty one of them participated in the election of the new Pope.

== Factions in the Sacred College ==
There were three main parties in the Sacred College, with cardinal-nephews of the deceased Popes as leaders:

- Borghesian party – the faction of Cardinal Borghese, nephew of Pope Paul V. It grouped twenty nine cardinals created by this Pontiff.
- Clementine party – It grouped thirteen cardinals of Clement VIII. Formally their leader was Camerlengo Pietro Aldobrandini, nephew of Clement VIII.
- Sistine party – small party of Vice-Chancellor Alessandro Montalto, cardinal-nephew of Sixtus V. It grouped six cardinals.

Three cardinals of the Italian ruling families (d'Este, Medici and Sforza) were not counted among the members of these factions.

It was generally thought that the next Pope would be the candidate chosen by Cardinal Borghese, because he was the most influential person in the Sacred College. He wanted to elect his friend Cardinal Campori, and already before opening the conclave he had obtained twenty four declarations in his favor. Although Campori had two significant opponents (Republic of Venice and Cardinal Orsini), Borghese was sure that he would be able to achieve his election on the first day of voting, by acclamation.

== Participants ==
=== present ===
The following 51 cardinals attended the conclave:

- Antonio Maria Sauli
- Benedetto Giustiniani
- Francesco Maria del Monte
- Francesco Sforza
- Alessandro Peretti di Montalto
- Pietro Aldobrandini
- Ottavio Bandini
- Bartolomeo Cesi
- Bonifazio Bevilacqua Aldobrandini
- Robert Bellarmin
- Giovanni Battista Deti
- Domenico Ginnasi
- Antonio Zapata y Cisneros
- Carlo Gaudenzio Madruzzo
- Giovanni Delfino
- Giacomo Sannesio
- Scipione Caffarelli Borghese
- Maffeo Barberini, later Pope Urban VIII
- Giovanni Garzia Millini
- Marcello Lante
- Michelangelo Tonti
- Fabrizio Verallo
- Giambattista Leni
- Decio Carafa
- Domenico Rivarola
- Jean de Bonsi
- Filippo Filonardi
- Pier Paolo Crescenzi
- Giacomo Serra
- Agostino Galamini
- Gaspar de Borja y Velasco
- Felice Centini
- Roberto Ubaldini
- Tiberio Muti
- Giulio Savelli
- Alessandro Ludovisi, (elected as Pope Gregory XV)
- Ladislao d'Aquino
- Pietro Campori
- Matteo Priuli
- Scipione Cobelluzzi
- Pietro Valier
- Giulio Roma
- Cesare Gherardi
- Desiderio Scaglia
- Stefano Pignatelli
- Andrea Baroni Peretti Montalto
- Alessandro d'Este
- Carlo Emmanuele Pio di Savoia
- Luigi Capponi
- Carlo di Ferdinando de’ Medici
- Alessandro Orsini

=== Absent ===
The following 19 cardinals were absent:

- Federico Borromeo
- Odoardo Farnese
- Franz Seraph von Dietrichstein
- François d'Escoubleau de Sourdis
- Giovanni Doria
- François de La Rochefoucald
- Prince Maurice of Savoy
- Louis III, Cardinal of Guise
- Gabriel Trejo Paniagua
- Baltasar Moscoso y Sandoval
- Melchior Khlesl
- Henri de Gondi
- Francisco Gómez de Sandoval y Rojas
- Cardinal-Infante Ferdinand of Austria
- Francesco Cennini de' Salamandri
- Guido Bentivoglio
- Eitel Frederick von Hohenzollern-Sigmaringen
- Louis de Nogaret de La Valette
- Agustín de Spínola Basadone

== The election of Pope Gregory XV ==
The conclave began in the evening of February 8. On the next day, Cardinal Borghese tried to elect Campori by acclamation, but failed because many of his friends defected and aligned themselves with Orsini, who had secured French support for his action against Campori. Facing such strong opposition, Campori withdrew his candidacy.

In the subsequent scrutiny (the only one during this conclave), the greatest number of votes received (fifteen) were for Jesuit Cardinal Robert Bellarmine, but he had already declared in the previous conclave that he would not accept papal dignity in the case of his election. Now, at the age of 78, Bellarmine did not change his mind.

The rest of the day the most influential cardinals: Borghese, Orsini, Zapata, Capponi, d'Este and Medici, spent on looking for a compromise candidature. Finally, the leaders of factions agreed to elect aged and ill Cardinal Alessandro Ludovisi of Bologna, who seemed to have been the ideal candidate for a temporary pontificate.

On that same day, at about 11 o’clock in the evening, all the cardinals assembled in the Capella Paolina and by acclamation elected Alessandro Ludovisi to the papacy. He accepted his election and took the name of Gregory XV.

== Legacy ==
Pope Gregory XV in his Bull Aeterni Patris Filius (November 15, 1621) prescribed that in the future only three modes of papal election were to be allowed: scrutiny, compromise, and quasi-inspiration. His Bull "Decet Romanum Pontificem" (March 12, 1622) contains a ceremonial that regulates these three modes of election in every detail. The ordinary mode of election was to be election by scrutiny, which required that the vote be secret, that each cardinal give his vote to only one candidate and that no one vote for himself. Most of the papal elections during the sixteenth century were influenced by political conditions and by party considerations in the College of Cardinals. By introducing secrecy of vote, Pope Gregory XV intended to abolish these abuses. The rules and ceremonies prescribed by Gregory XV were kept substantially the same until Pope John Paul II issued the constitution "Universi Dominici Gregis" in 1996.
