= Ascanio Filomarino =

Italian Roman Catholic cardinal

- Cardinal-Priest of Santa Maria in Ara Coeli
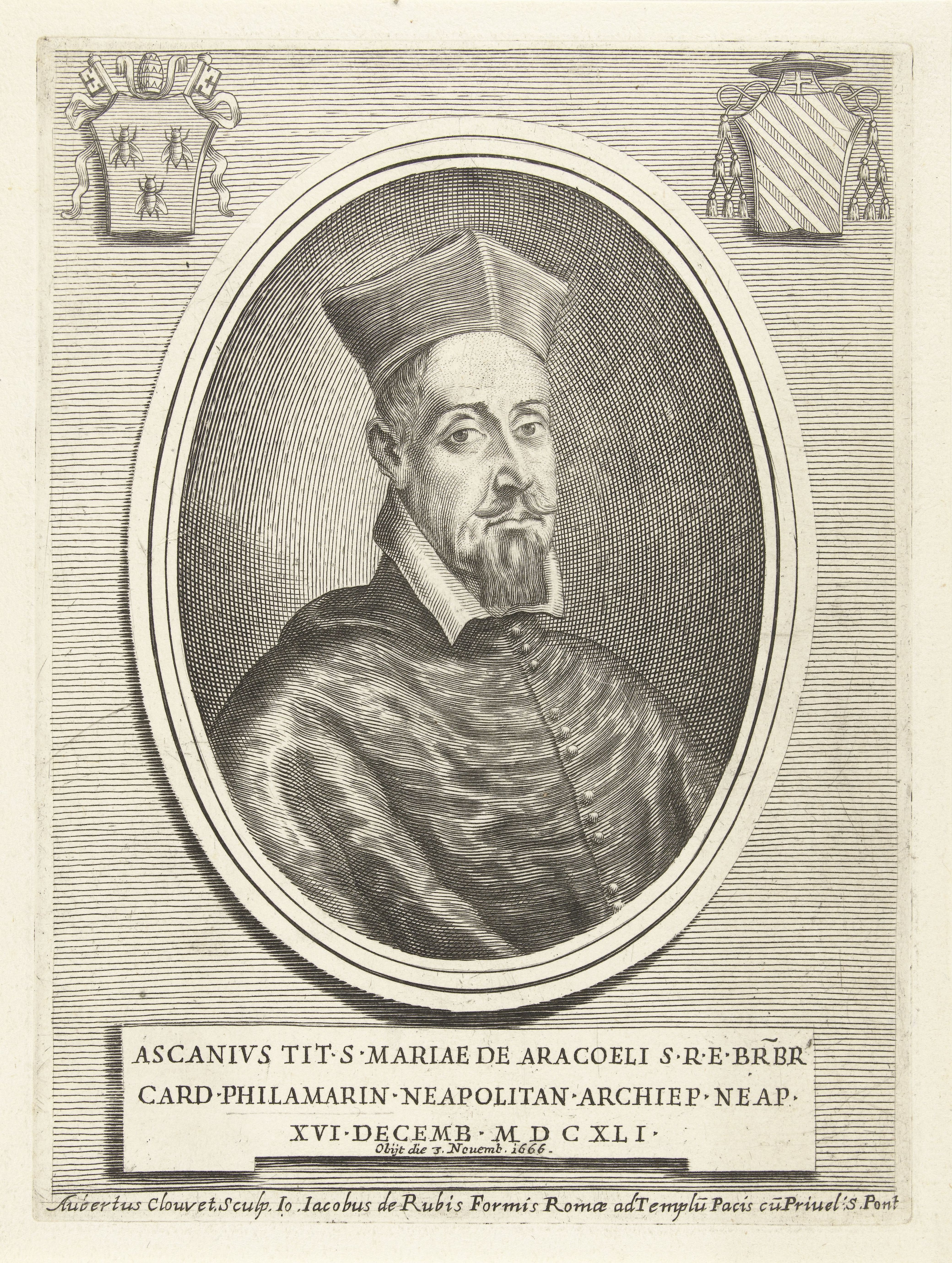
- Church: Catholic Church
- See: Santa Maria in Ara Coeli
- In office: 10 February 1642 – 3 November 1666
- Predecessor: Agostino Galamini
- Successor: Carlo Roberti de' Vittori
- Other post: Archbishop of Naples (1641-1666)

Orders
- Consecration: 19 January 1642 by Antonio Marcello Barberini
- Created cardinal: 16 December 1641 by Pope Urban VIII

Personal details
- Born: 1583 Naples, Kingdom of Naples, Spanish Empire
- Died: 3 November 1666 (aged 82–83)

Ascanio Filomarino (1583 – 3 November 1666) was an Italian Roman Catholic cardinal, who was Archbishop of Naples from 1641 to 1666.

== Early life ==
Filomarino was born in Naples to the noble family of the dukes Della Torre. Eldest of the five sons of Claudio Filomarino and Porzia di Leonessa. Though the family was well-respected, it was nonetheless not a wealthy family. Filomarino was, though, able to obtain a doctorate of law in Benevento and thereafter travelled to Rome (with friend Ladislao d'Aquino who would also later become a cardinal) in an effort to support himself financially.

There, he presented himself to a number of cardinals with a view to being employed by one of them. Eventually, he came to the attention of Cardinal Maffeo Barberini who was in need of a new chamberlain. In 1623, Barberini was elected to the papacy and took the name Pope Urban VIII and thereafter Filomarino became master of the chamber to the pope's young cardinal-nephew, Francesco Barberini, while he was legate to France and Spain.

Francesco did not like his older tutor or did not like having a tutor at all. But Filomarino was protected by the young cardinal's uncle, the pope, who had promised to promote Filomarino to the rank of cardinal. Barberini, though keen to be rid of his supervision, was loath to see Filomarino elevated to the same status as himself and insisted that the tutor was still essential. Eventually Barberini gave in and Filomarino was allowed to leave his service and was promoted.

== Ecclesiastic career ==
Filomarino was elevated to cardinal in the consistory of 16 December 1641 and was, on that same day, appointed Archbishop of Naples.

He participated in the papal conclave of 1644 and the papal conclave of 1655.

== In Naples ==
Filomarino is of particular interest in the history of Naples since he was cardinal during two especially turbulent periods: Masaniello's revolt in 1645 and the severe plague epidemic of 1656.

Filomarino's role in the revolt of 1647 was one of mediation between the rebels and the government. He was outspoken in his opposition to increasing taxation in the Spanish vice-realm of Naples, monies that the Spanish needed to pay for their part in the Thirty Years War. He was a focal point for the people against the overbearing Spanish throne and was trusted by the rebel Masaniello as well as by Giulio Genoino, the apparent real political strategist behind the revolt. As cardinal, however, he was part of the establishment and could approach the government; thus, he was in an ideal position to mediate.

Filomarino certainly was aware of popular discontent in Naples and warned the Pope that the masses were "boiling".

Some sources claim that Filomarino was primarily interested in reducing the power of the large landed Spanish noble class in favor of the growing, but overtaxed, merchant middle class in Naples. Further — so they claim — when Filomarino had used Masaniello to that end, he arranged to have the rebel delivered into the hands of captors, where he was murdered. Such a claim is impossible to substantiate.

== Other accounts ==
There are a number of anecdotes about Filomarino. One is that during the plague of 1656, he ordered the churches to care for the stricken, yet apparently was among the first to seek refuge in the monastery of San Martino. Another was that he had to be reminded by Rome that the sacred relics of San Gennaro (Saint Januarius), patron saint of the city, were not his own personal property and that he was not authorized to claim, as he had, that "...the relics are mine...", nor authorized to remove them from the premises of the Cathedral of Naples for the purpose of soliciting miraculous cures in private homes.

Cardinal Filomarino died on 3 November 1666 and is buried in the cathedral of Naples.

Catholic Church titles
Preceded by Francesco Boncompagni	Archbishop of Naples; 1641–1666	Succeeded by Innico Caracciolo (seniore)
Preceded by Agostino Galamini	Cardinal-Priest of Santa Maria in Ara Coeli; 1642–1666	Succeeded by Carlo Roberti de' Vittori
