= Agostino Galamini =

Italian cardinal and bishop

Agostino Galamini O.P.
- Cardinal-Priest of Santa Maria in Ara Coeli
- Church: Catholic Church
- See: Santa Maria in Ara Coeli
- In office: 14 November 1612 – 6 September 1639
- Predecessor: Francesco Maria del Monte
- Successor: Ascanio Filomarino
- Other post: Bishop of Osimo (1620-1639)
- Previous posts: Bishop of Recanati e Loreto (1613-1620); Master of the Order of Preachers (1608-1612)

Orders
- Consecration: 12 March 1613 by Pope Paul V
- Created cardinal: 5 June 1596 by Pope Clement VIII

Personal details
- Born: 1553 Brisighella, Romagna, Papal States
- Died: 6 September 1639 (aged 85–86)

Agostino Galamini, O.P. (1553 – 6 September 1639) was an Italian cardinal and bishop.

== Biography ==
Agostino Galamini was born in Brisighella in 1553. His mother was a relative of Agostino Recuperati, the Master of the Order of Preachers. He joined the Dominican Order, changing his name from Simone to Agostino. He did his novitiate in Faenza, and then took his monastic vows in Meldola.

After he was ordained as a priest, he accepted a teaching assignment at Bologna, later moving to Naples. In 1592, he became inquisitor of Brescia; he later held the same office in Piacenza, then Genoa, then Milan.

He moved to Rome in 1604, becoming a commissioner of the Roman Inquisition. Under Pope Clement VIII, he served as Master of the Sacred Palace.

The Dominican Order elected him Master of the Order of Preachers in 1608.

On 17 August 1611 Pope Paul V named him cardinal. On 14 November 1612 he received the titular church of Santa Maria in Aracoeli.

He participated in the papal conclave of 1621 that elected Pope Gregory XV and in the papal conclave of 1623 that elected Pope Urban VIII.

He was elected Bishop of Recanati and Loreto on 11 February 1631. He was consecrated as a bishop on 12 March 1631. On 29 April 1620 he was translated to the Diocese of Osimo.

He died in Genoa on 6 September 1639.

== Episcopal succession ==
Episcopal succession of Agostino Galamini

While bishop, he was the principal consecrator of:

- Tommaso Sanfelice, Bishop of Montepeloso (1615); and
- Giovanni Sanctatus, Bishop of Rethymo (1616).

Catholic Church titles
Preceded by Jerónimo Xavierre	Master of the Order of Preachers; 1608–1612	Succeeded by Serafino Secchi
Preceded by Francesco Maria Bourbon Del Monte Santa Maria	Cardinal-Priest of Santa Maria in Ara Coeli; 1612–1639	Succeeded by Ascanio Filomarino
Preceded by Rutilio Benzoni	Bishop of Recanati e Loreto; 1613–1620	Succeeded by Giulio Roma
Preceded by Antonio Maria Gallo	Bishop of Osimo; 1620–1639	Succeeded by Girolamo Verospi
Records
Preceded by Domenico Ginnasi	Oldest living Member of the Sacred College; 3 March 1639 - 6 September 1639	Succeeded by Pietro Campori
