= Domenico Ginnasi =

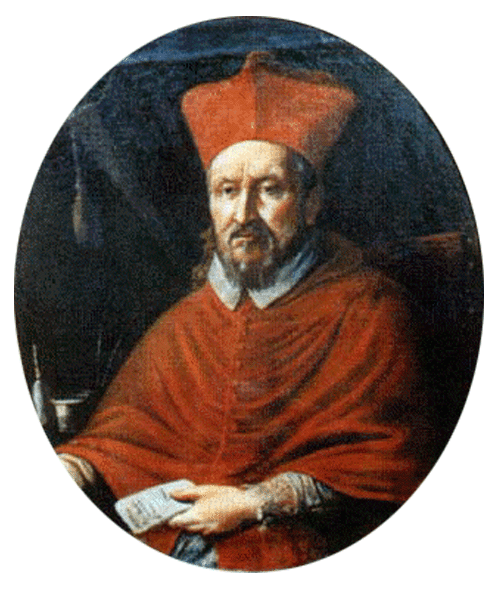
Cardinal Domenico Ginnasi

Domenico Ginnasi (19 June 1550 in Castel Bolognese – 12 March 1639, in Rome) was a Cardinal of the Roman Catholic church created by Pope Clement VIII.

== Biography ==
Ginnasi was born the third of seven children to Francesco Ginnasi, a Papal archivist, and his wife, Caterina Pallantieri. One of his younger brothers, Achille Ginnasi (1553-1594), served as Apostolic Protonotary, nominated in 1593, as governor of the County of Castel Bolognese by Clement VIII. In 1585–86, Domenico was nominated to be governor of the territory of Campagna, which now is mostly the province of Frosinone. Domenico was elected bishop of Manfredonia (1587-1600) in the consistory of 14 June 1587 held by Pope Sixtus V. In Manfredonia, he founded in 1592 the Monastery of St Clair and institutes a Seminary. He next served as Apostolic Nuncio to Spain.

Pope Clement elevated him to Cardinal on 9 June 1604. It is said that Domenico ministered the viaticum to a dying Camillus de Lellis on 2 July 1614. Camillus was beatified in 1742. In 1630, Domenico reconstructed the medieval church of Santa Lucia alle Botteghe Oscure that stood near his family's Palace in Central Rome. The church was decorated with canvases by his niece, Caterina Ginnasi. He died age of 88 from an attack of gout, and was buried in this church.

Catholic Church titles
Preceded by Giuseppe Sappi	Archbishop of Manfredonia; 1586–1607	Succeeded by Annibale Ginnasi
Preceded by Offredo de Offredi	Apostolic Nuncio to Florence; 1598–1600	Succeeded by Antonio Grimani
Preceded by Camillo Caetani	Apostolic Nuncio to Spain; 1600–1605	Succeeded by Giovanni Garzia Mellini
Preceded by Pietro Aldobrandini	Cardinal-Priest of San Pancrazio; 1605–1606	Succeeded by Ludovico de Torres
Preceded by François d'Escoubleau de Sourdis	Cardinal-Priest of Santi XII Apostoli; 1606–1624	Succeeded by Desiderio Scaglia
Preceded by Andrea Baroni Peretti Montalto	Cardinal-Priest of San Lorenzo in Lucina; 1624–1626	Succeeded by Carlo Gaudenzio Madruzzo
Preceded by Andrea Baroni Peretti Montalto	Cardinal-Bishop of Palestrina; 1626–1629	Succeeded by Marcello Lante della Rovere
Preceded by Ottavio Bandini	Cardinal-Bishop of Porto e Santa Rufina; 1629–1630	Succeeded by Carlo Emmanuele Pio di Savoia
Preceded by Giovanni Battista Deti	Cardinal-Bishop of Ostia e Velletri; 1630–1639	Succeeded by Carlo Emmanuele Pio di Savoia
Records
Preceded by Antonmaria Sauli	Oldest living Member of the Sacred College; 24 August 1623 - 3 March 1639	Succeeded by Agostino Galamini
