= Scipione Cobelluzzi =

17th-century Italian Catholic cardinal and librarian (1564-1626)

- Cardinal-Priest of Santa Susanna
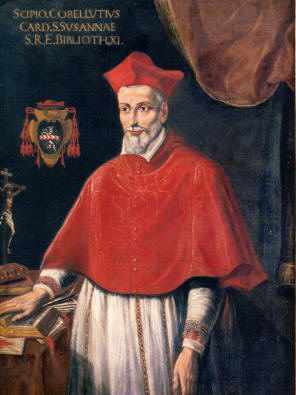
- Church: Santa Susanna
- Diocese: Rome
- Appointed: 17 October 1616
- Other post: Librarian of Vatican Library

Orders
- Created cardinal: 19 September 1616 by Pope Paul V

Personal details
- Born: 1564 Viterbo, Papal States
- Died: 29 June 1626 (aged 61–62) Rome, Papal States
- Buried: Santa Susanna Church, Rome
- Denomination: Roman Catholic
- Education: Sapienza University of Rome

Scipione Cobelluzzi (1564 – 29 June 1626) was an Italian cardinal, archivist and librarian. He was chief archivist of the Vatican Secret Archives (which now holds over 85 linear kilometres of shelving), from 17 February 1618 until his death on 29 June 1626.

== Early years ==
Scipione Cobelluzzi was born in Viterbo into a well-off family: according to the Jesuit Angelo Galluzzi, who gave his funeral oration, his father, a pharmacist, became conservatore (magistrate) of Viterbo on the same day that Scipione was born. He was educated in Rome by the Jesuits in the 'Collegio Nardini' and studied Greek privately with Niccolò Alemanni. He also studied at the Archgymnasium of Rome. He graduated in civil and canon law from the Sapienza University of Rome. There were other cardinals in his family, including Girolamo Bernerio, Francesco Cennini de' Salamandri, and Desiderio Scaglia.

Cobelluzzi worked as a prefect for Alessandro Gloriero, president of the Annona, and then as secretary to Cardinal Girolamo Bernerio. In 1609, he served as the Secretary of Briefs. He also taught law at the university.

Although Cobelluzzi's publications have not survived, he had the reputation of being well educated, erudite and an eloquent speaker. He became domestic secretary to Pope Paul V, who appointed him in 1611 to a position in the Papal Curia and in 1615, custodian of the Archive of Castel Sant'Angelo. On 17 October 1616, he was named Cardinal-Priest of Santa Susanna, and he was then appointed Cardinal Librarian on 17 February 1618. In this last post, in 1622, he directed Leo Allatius, who had made the journey to Heidelberg for the transfer, in the acquisition of the Palatine Library. While Cardinal, his secretary was Vincenzo Gramigna. Cobelluzzi was also Cardinal Archivist for the Vatican Secret Archives from 1618 to 1626 (the word "Secret" is better understood to mean 'private' than 'secret' in this context). The Vatican library also has a record of the astrological prediction by Gioanni Bartolini for 1618, given to him when he was Cardinal-Priest of Santa Susanna.

After the death of Paul V on 28 January 1621, perhaps in gratitude to the former pope, Cobelluzzi supported the candidacy of Scipione Borghese at the papal conclave which elected Pope Gregory XV; later, they were not on good terms. He was a member of the Inquisition and one of the cardinals who questioned Galileo after he came to Rome, and also of the Congregation for the Propagation of the Faith, created on 6 January 1622, to which he gave 100 scudi a year for ransoming prisoners of the Turks. He was also one of the cardinals on the commission created to adjudicate the proposed marriage between the Prince of Wales, the future Charles I of England, and the Infanta Maria Anna of Spain; in 1623 the commission recommended to the Pope that the marriage be permitted.

After the death of Pope Gregory XV on 8 July 1623, Cobelluzzi participated in the conclave of 1623. He was considered to belong to the French faction and with a reputation as a "spiritual" man, was one of the major candidates to succeed him, Pope Urban VIII was elected. While on a pilgrimage from Montecassino to Loreto, he developed a cancerous lesion or gangrene in an arm, which led to his death in 1626. He is buried in the Church of Santa Susanna at the Baths of Diocletian in Rome. Deeply revered for his writings and promoting religious order, he was buried in a tomb with a plaque extolling his virtues and contributions and depicting his heraldic arms. He willed his possessions to the Jesuit College.
