= Francesco Cennini de' Salamandri =

Italian Catholic cardinal (1566–1645)

His Eminence Francesco Cennini de' Salamandri
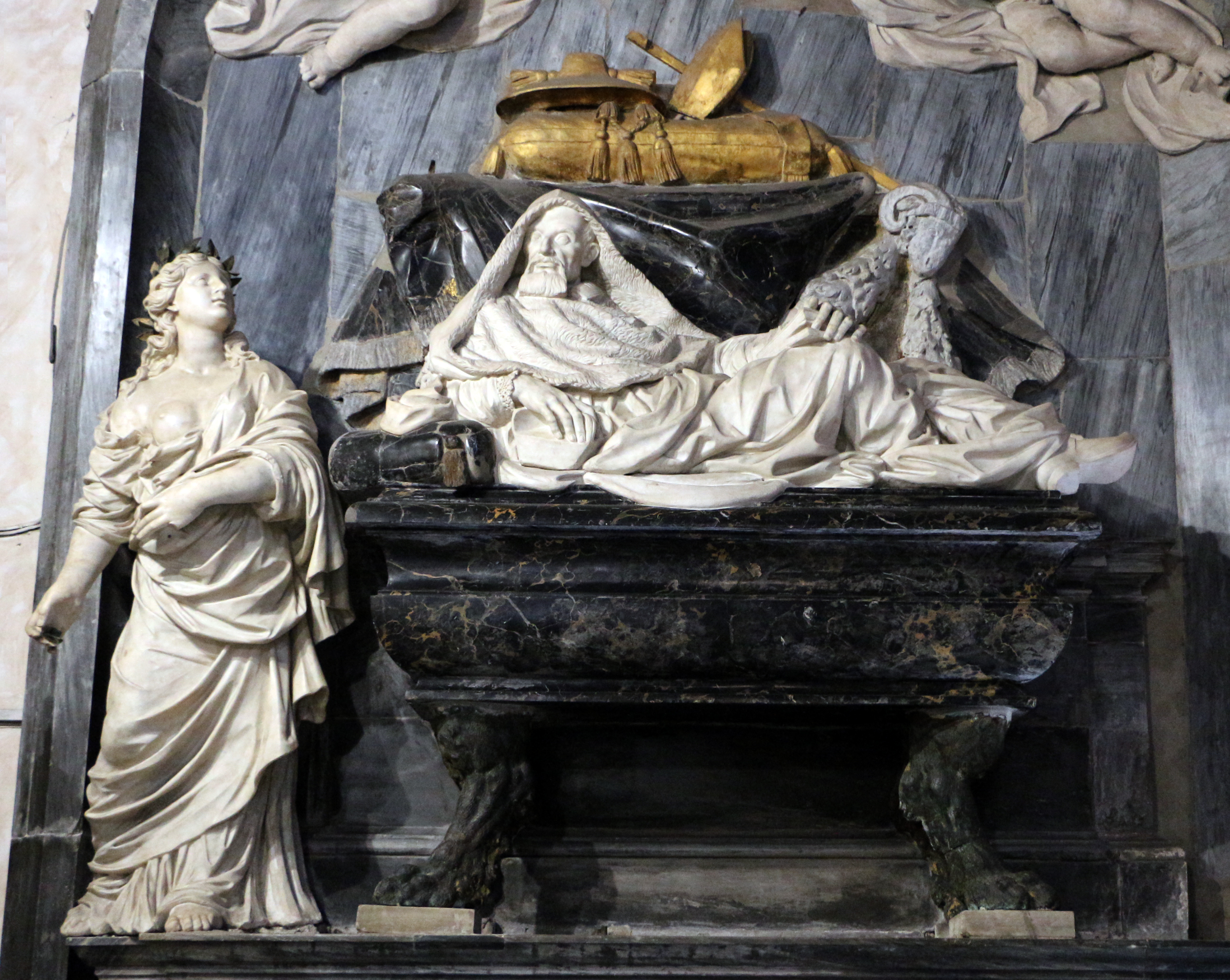
- Tomb of Francesco Cennini de' Salamandri
- Church: Catholic Church

Orders
- Consecration: 21 Oct 1612 by Giovanni Garzia Mellini

Personal details
- Born: 21 November 1566 Sarteano, Italy
- Died: 2 October 1645 (age 78)

Francesco Cennini de' Salamandri (21 November 1566 – 2 October 1645) was an Italian Catholic Cardinal.

== Biography ==
Cennini de' Salamandri was born 21 November 1566 in Sarteano into a noble family of Marquises of Castiglioncello del Trinoro. He received a Doctorate utroque iure and was ordained a priest in 1591 at age 24.

He was named the parish priest of Sarteano, and Archpriest and Vicar-General of the Diocese of Chiusi before going to Rome to work as a legal advocate. In 1612, he was elected the Bishop of Amelia and became a Signatory of the Apostolic Penitentiary and served as Governor of Rome for eight years. On 21 October 1612, he was consecrated bishop by Giovanni Garzia Mellini, Cardinal-Priest of Santi Quattro Coronati, with Alessandro Ludovisi, Archbishop of Bologna, and Lorenzo Landi, Bishop of Fossombrone, serving as co-consecrators. In 1618, he was named Nuncio to Spain and remained there until 1621 and the Latin Patriarch of Jerusalem - a title he retained until 1645.

Cennini de' Salamandri was elevated to Cardinal in 1621 but did not participate in the Papal conclave that year. He did participate in the conclave of 1623 that elected Pope Urban VIII and was made Bishop of Faenza later that year where he served for 18 years.

He was appointed the Cardinal-Priest of Sabina-Poggio Mirteto in 1641, resigned as Bishop of Faenza in 1643 and participated in the Papal conclave of 1644 that elected Pope Innocent X. He was named Prefect of the Congregation for the Clergy and Vice-Dean of the Sacred College of Cardinals later in 1644.

The following year, 1645, he was appointed Cardinal-Priest of Porto e Santa Rufina but he died on 2 October, only six months later. He was buried at the foot of the tomb of Pope Pius V in the Cappella Paolina.

While bishop, he was the principal co-consecrator of Mario Sassi, Archbishop of Rossano (1612); Giovanni Francesco Guidi di Bagno, Titular Archbishop of Patrae and Apostolic Nuncio to Flanders (1614); and Domenico Bonzi, Titular Bishop of Caesarea in Cappadocia and Coadjutor Bishop of Béziers (1616).

== See also ==
- Catholic Church hierarchy
- College of Cardinals
- List of living cardinals
- Politics of Vatican City
- Roman Curia

Catholic Church titles
Preceded by Antonio Maria Franceschini	Bishop of Amelia; 1612 – 1623	Succeeded by Domenico Pichi
Preceded by Antonio Caetani (iuniore)	Apostolic Nuncio to Spain; 1618 – 1621	Succeeded by Alessandro di Sangro
Preceded by Scipione Gonzaga	Latin Patriarch of Jerusalem; 1618 – 1645	Succeeded by Vacant
Preceded by François d'Escoubleau de Sourdis	Cardinal-Priest of San Marcello; 1621 – 1641	Succeeded by Pierdonato Cesi (iuniore)
Preceded by Marco Antonio Gozzadini	Bishop of Faenza; 1623 – 1643	Succeeded by Carlo Rossetti
Preceded by Felice Centini	Cardinal-Priest of Sabina-Poggio Mirteto; 1641 – 1645	Succeeded by Carlo de' Medici
Preceded by Giambattista Pamphilj	Prefect of the Congregation for the Clergy; 1644 – 1645	Succeeded by Pier Luigi Carafa
Preceded by Pier Paolo Crescenzi	Cardinal-Priest of Porto-Santa Rufina; 1645	Succeeded by Giulio Roma
