= Marcello Lante della Rovere =

17th-century Catholic cardinal

His Eminence Marcello Lante della Rovere
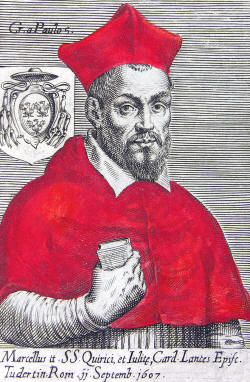
- Cardinal Marcello Lante della Rovere (1606)
- Church: Catholic Church

Orders
- Consecration: 14 Jan 1607 by Pope Paul V

Personal details
- Born: 1561 Rome, Italy
- Died: 19 April 1652 (age 91) Rome, Italy

Marcello Lante della Rovere (1561 – 19 April 1652) was an Italian Catholic Cardinal appointed Dean and Camerlengo of the College of Cardinals.

== Family and early life ==
Lante was born 1561, the son of Ludovico Lante of the Dukes Della Rovere and M. Lavinia Maffei. His sister was married to Pope Paul V's brother and his nephew was Ippolito Lante Montefeltro della Rovere who became Duke of Bomarzo

As a young man he was named cleric and then auditor-general of the Apostolic Chamber of Pope Clement VIII.

== Ecclesiastic career ==
He was elevated to Cardinal on 11 September 1606 and installed as Cardinal-Priest at the church of Santi Quirico e Giulitta. In December of that same year he was elected Bishop of Todi where he served for until 1625. On 14 Jan 1607, he was consecrated bishop by Pope Paul V with Ottavio Paravicini, Cardinal-Priest of Sant'Alessio, and Carlo Conti, Bishop of Ancona e Numana, serving as co-consecrators.

Participated in the Papal conclave of 1621 and then the conclave of 1623 which elected Pope Urban VIII. During Urban's pontificate, he was appointed to a number of Church administrative positions including Camerlengo of the Sacred College of Cardinals (1625 to 1626) before being appointed Dean of the College of Cardinals in time to preside over the conclave of 1644 which elected Urban's successor, Pope Innocent X.

For a year, in 1629, he served at Cardinal-Bishop of Palestrina and later that year he was appointed Bishop of Frascati and served for 10 years until being appointed Bishop of Porto e Santa Rufina in 1639.

Lante died on 18 April 1652 and was buried at the San Nicola da Tolentino agli Orti Sallustiani.

== Episcopal succession ==
Episcopal succession of Marcello Lante della Rovere

While bishop, he was the principal consecrator of:

- Pietro Antonio Da Ponte, Bishop of Troia (1607);
- Timocrate Aloigi (Democrate Aloisi), Bishop of Cagli (1607);
- Orazio Maffei, Archbishop of Chieti (1607);
- Fabrizio Degli Afflitti, Bishop of Boiano (1608);
- Girolamo Asteo, Bishop of Veroli (1608);
- Michael Consoli, Bishop of Sora (1609);
- Antonio Cesonio, Bishop of Oppido Mamertina (1609);
- Juan de Espila (Giovanni Spilla), Archbishop of Acerenza e Matera (1611);
- Gabriele Naro (Gabriele Nari), Bishop of San Marco (1613);
- Agostino Cassandra, Bishop of Gravina di Puglia (1614);
- Domenico Pichi, Bishop of Amelia (1623);
- Michael Masserotti (Michael Misserotti), Bishop of Bitetto (1624);
- Ulysses Gherardini della Rosa, Bishop of Sessa Aurunca (1624);
- Fabio Olivadisi, Bishop of Lavello (1626);
- Gerolamo Cappello, Bishop of Termoli (1626);
- Nicola Benigno, Bishop of Città Ducale (1627);
- Luca Cellesi, Bishop of Martirano (1627);
- Giuliano Viviani, Auxiliary Bishop of Ostia-Velletri and Titular Bishop of Salona (1629);
- Felice Franceschini, Bishop of Andria (1632);
- Felix Crocca, Bishop of Acqui (1632);
- Pietro Morari, Bishop of Capodistria (1632);
- Paolo Benzoni, Bishop of Sora (1632);
- Pomponio Vetuli, Bishop of Città Ducale (1632);
- Marco Antonio Parisi, Bishop of Oria (1632);
- Bartolomeo Gizio, Bishop of Belcastro (1633);
- Giovanni Michele Rossi, Bishop of Minervino Murge (1633);
- Marc'Antonio Verità, Bishop of Ossero (1633);
- Defendente Brusati, Bishop of San Marco (1633);
- Brandimarte Tommasi, Auxiliary Bishop of Sabina and Titular Bishop of Salamis (1633);
- Gregorio Naro, Bishop of Rieti (1634);
- Ippolito Campioni, Bishop of Chiusi (1638);
- Francesco Antonio Biondo, Bishop of Capri (1638);
- Marco Antonio Coccini, Bishop of Anglona-Tursi (1638);
- Roberto Strozzi, Bishop of Colle di Val d'Elsa (1638);
- Bartolomeo Cresconi, Bishop of Umbriatico (1639);
- Giovanni Mauro, Bishop of Nusco (1642);
- Ascanio Maffei, Archbishop of Urbino (1646);
- Bonaventura Claverio, Bishop of Potenza (1646);
- Franciscus Perrone, Bishop of Caiazzo (1648);
- Francesco Antonio Roberti, Bishop of Alessano (1648); and
- Pirro Luigi Castellomata, Bishop of Ascoli Satriano (1648);

and the principal co-consecrator of:

- Pompeio Arrigoni, Archbishop of Benevento (1607);
- Anselmo Marzato, Archbishop of Chieti (1607);
- Benedetto Giustiniani, Bishop of Palestrina (1612); and
- Francesco Peretti di Montalto, Archbishop of Monreale (1650).

== References and notes ==
Catholic Church titles
Preceded by Lucio Sassi	Cardinal-Priest of Santi Quirico e Giulitta; 1606–1628	Succeeded by Gregorio Naro
Preceded by Angelo Cesi	Bishop of Todi; 1606–1625	Succeeded by Lodovico Cinci
Preceded by François d'Escoubleau de Sourdis	Cardinal-Priest of Santa Prassede; 1628–1629	Succeeded by Roberto Ubaldini
Preceded by Domenico Ginnasi	Cardinal-Bishop of Palestrina; 1629	Succeeded by Pier Paolo Crescenzi
Preceded by Giovanni Garzia Mellini	Cardinal-Bishop of Frascati; 1629–1639	Succeeded by Giulio Savelli
Preceded by Carlo Emmanuele Pio di Savoia	Cardinal-Bishop of Porto e Santa Rufina; 1639–1641	Succeeded by Pier Paolo Crescenzi
Preceded by Carlo Emanuele Pio di Savoia	Cardinal-Bishop of Ostia e Velletri; 1641–1652	Succeeded by Giulio Roma
Records
Preceded by rançois de La Rochefoucauld	Oldest living Member of the Sacred College; 14 February 1643 - 19 April 1652	Succeeded by Alfonso de la Cueva Benavides y Mendoza-Carillo
