= Carlo de' Medici (cardinal) =

Catholic cardinal

His Eminence Carlo de' Medici
- Dean of the College of Cardinals
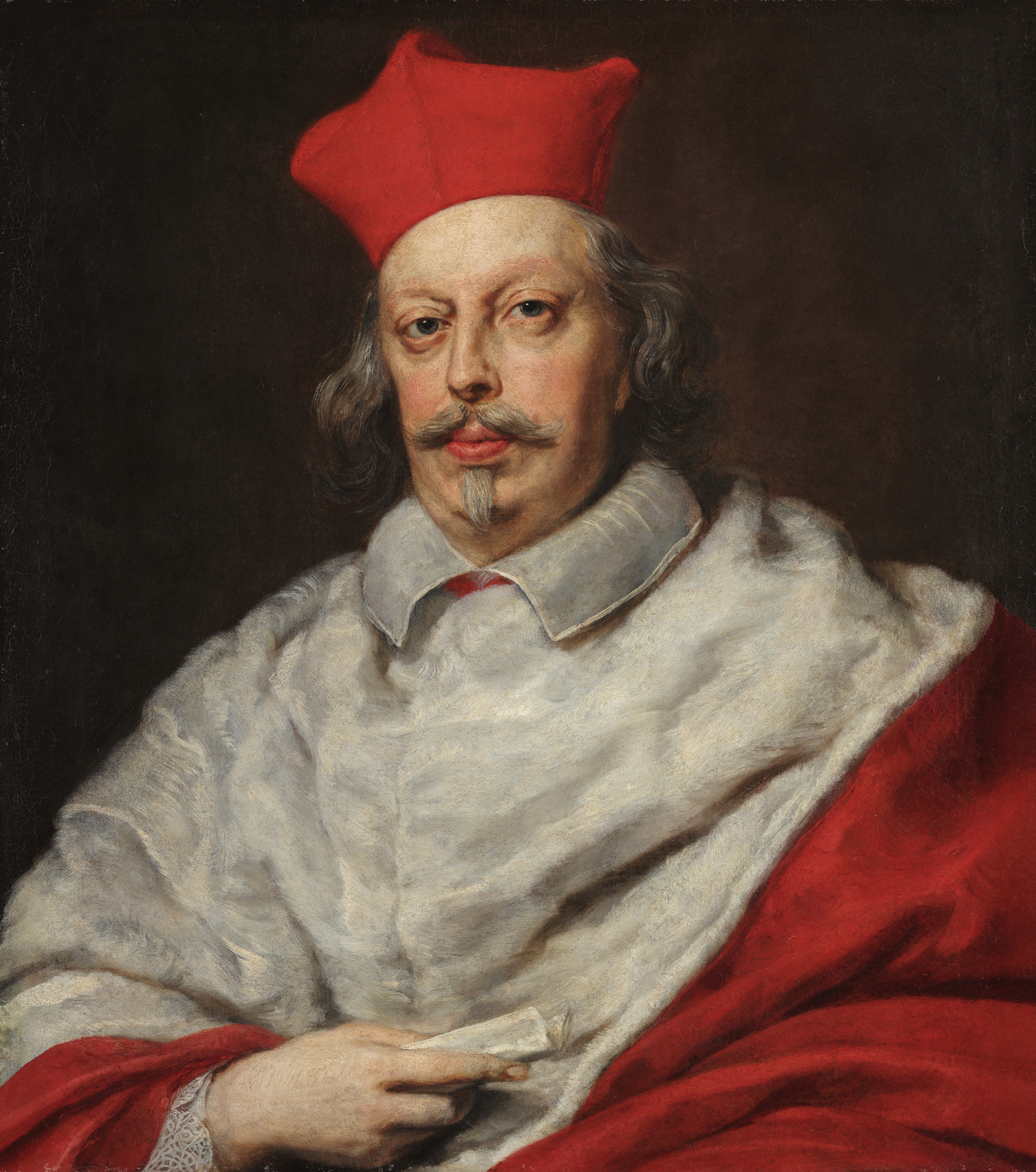
- Portrait by Justus Sustermans, c. 1650
- Church: Catholic Church
- Appointed: 23 September 1652
- Term ended: 17 June 1666
- Predecessor: Giulio Roma
- Successor: Francesco Barberini
- Other posts: Cardinal-Bishop of Ostia-Velletri (1652-1666)
- Previous posts: See list: Cardinal-Deacon of Santa Maria in Domnica (1616-1623); Cardinal-Deacon of San Nicola in Carcere (1623-1644); Cardinal-Priest of San Sisto Vecchio (1644-1645); Cardinal-Bishop of Frascati (1645-1652)

Orders
- Consecration: 17 April 1645 by Annibale Bentivoglio
- Created cardinal: 2 December 1615 by Pope Paul V
- Rank: Cardinal-Bishop

Personal details
- Born: 19 March 1595 Florence, Italy
- Died: 17 June 1666 (aged 71) Florence, Italy
- Buried: Basilica of San Lorenzo
- Coat of arms

Carlo de' Medici (19 March 1595 – 17 June 1666) was an Italian nobleman and Cardinal of the Roman Catholic Church.

== Early life and ancestry ==
Born into the powerful and wealthy Florentine House of Medici, he was the fifth child and third son of Ferdinando I de' Medici, Grand Duke of Tuscany and his wife, Christina of Lorraine. His paternal grandparents were Cosimo I de' Medici, Grand Duke of Tuscany, and his wife, Eleanor of Toledo, the daughter of Pedro Álvarez de Toledo, Marquis of Villafranca, the Spanish viceroy of the Kingdom of Naples. His maternal grandparents were Charles III, Duke of Lorraine and his wife, Claude of Valois, daughter of Henry II, King of France and Catherine de' Medici.

== Biography ==
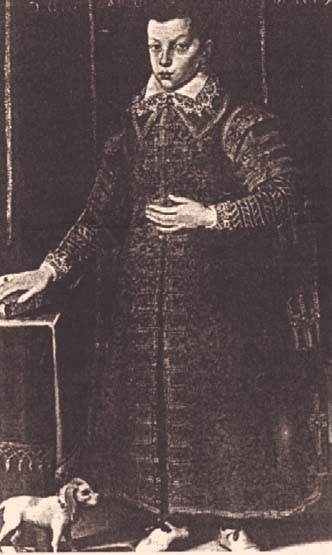
Carlo as a boy.

Born in Florence, as a younger son into an influential Italian noble family, he was destined for a career in Church. Fulfilling his promise, he had a successful ecclesiastical career, rising to become Cardinal Bishop of Ostia and Dean of the College of Cardinals. De' Medici was raised to the cardinalate by Pope Paul V in the consistory of 2 December 1615 and was made Cardinal Deacon of Santa Maria in Domnica. He was an elector at the papal conclaves of 1621 and 1623 that elected Pope Gregory XV and Pope Urban VIII. He transferred deaconries to that of San Nicola in Carcere in 1623, and was the Cardinal protodeacon at the conclave of 1644 that elected Pope Innocent X. He was briefly Cardinal Deacon of Sant'Eustachio, before being raised to the order of Cardinal Priests in December 1644, with the title of San Sisto.

The next year, de' Medici was raised to Cardinal Bishop of Sabina, but opted for the suburbicarian see of Frascati seven months later. On 29 April 1652 he was made Cardinal Bishop of Porto e Santa Rufina and Vice-Dean of the College of Cardinals. On 23 September the same year he became Dean of the College of Cardinals and Cardinal Bishop of Ostia e Velletri. He presided over the conclave of 1655 and announced the papal election of Pope Alexander VII.

== Death ==
Carlo de' Medici died in Florence in 1666. He is buried at his family crypt at the Basilica di San Lorenzo di Firenze.

== Ancestors ==
Ancestors of Carlo de' Medici (cardinal)

16. Giovanni di Pierfrancesco de' Medici
8. Ludovico di Giovanni de' Medici
17. Caterina Sforza
4. Cosimo I de' Medici, Grand Duke of Tuscany
18. Jacopo Salviati
9. Maria Salviati
19. Lucrezia de' Medici
2. Ferdinando I de' Medici, Grand Duke of Tuscany
20. Fadrique Álvarez de Toledo y Enríquez de Guzmán
10. Pedro de Toledo y Zúñiga
21. Isabel de Zúñiga y Pimentel
5. Eleanor of Toledo
22. Luis Pimentel y Pacheco
11. María Osorio y Pimentel
23. Juana Osorio y Bazán
1. Claudia de' Medici
24. Anthony, Duke of Lorraine
12. Francis I, Duke of Lorraine
25. Renée of Bourbon
6. Charles III, Duke of Lorraine
26. Christian II of Denmark
13. Christina of Denmark
27. Isabella of Austria
3. Christina of Lorraine
28. Francis I of France
14. Henry II of France
29. Claude, Duchess of Brittany
7. Claude of Valois
30. Lorenzo de' Medici, Duke of Urbino
15. Catherine de' Medici
31. Madeleine de La Tour d'Auvergne
