= Desiderio Scaglia =

Italian cardinal and bishop

His Eminence Desiderio Cardinal Scaglia, O.P.
- Cardinal-Priest of San Clemente; Cardinal-Priest of Twelve Holy Apostles; Cardinal-Priest of San Carlo al Corso; Bishop Emeritus of Como
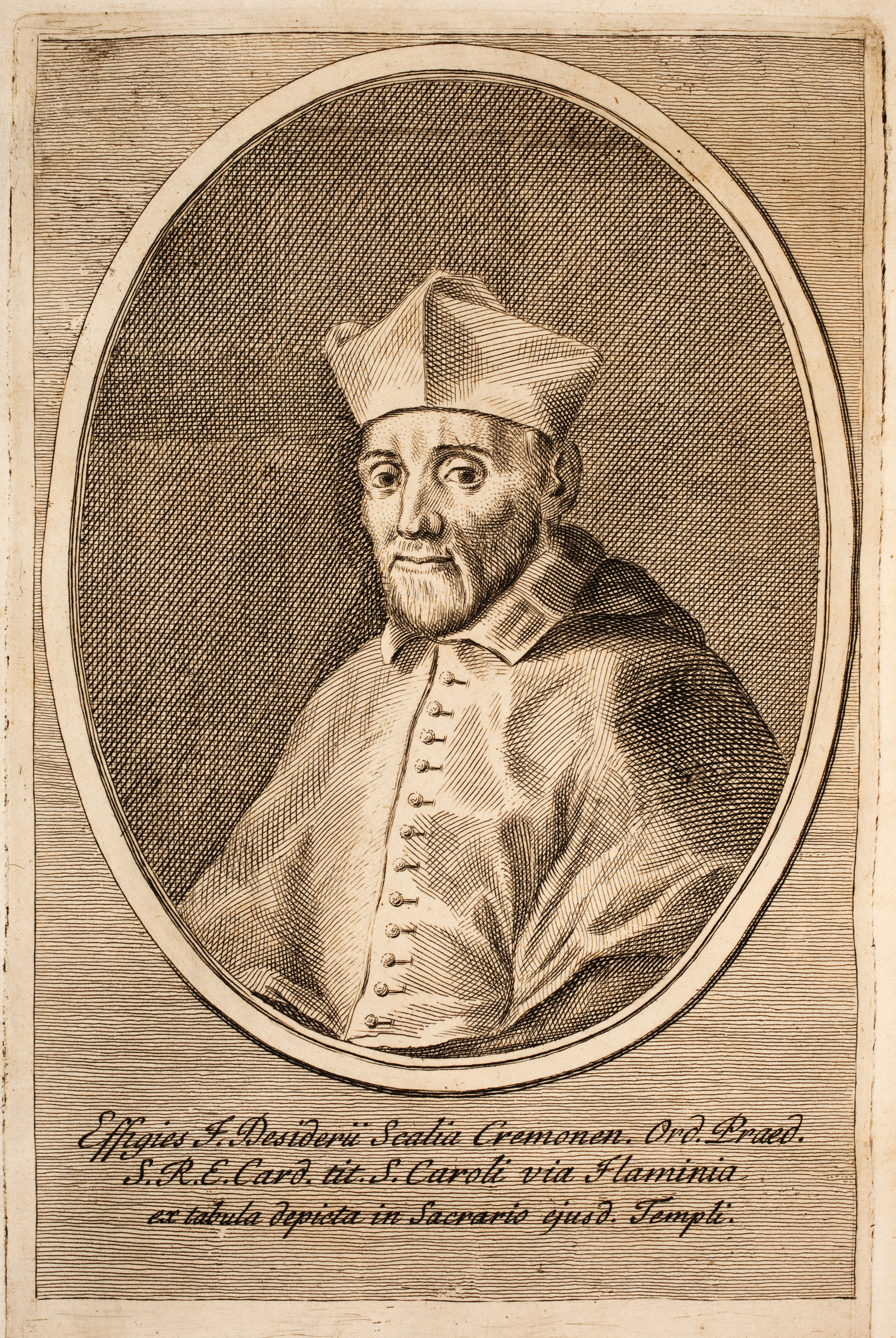
- Church: San Carlo al Corso
- Diocese: Melfi and Rapolla, and Como
- Appointed: 1621
- Other post: Camerlengo of the Sacred College of Cardinals

Orders
- Ordination: 16 May 1621 (episcopal) by Giambattista Cardinal Leni
- Created cardinal: 11 January 1621 by Pope Paul V

Personal details
- Born: 1567 Cremona, Duchy of Milan
- Died: 21 August 1639 (age 72) Rome, Papal States
- Buried: San Carlo al Corso, Rome
- Denomination: Roman Catholic

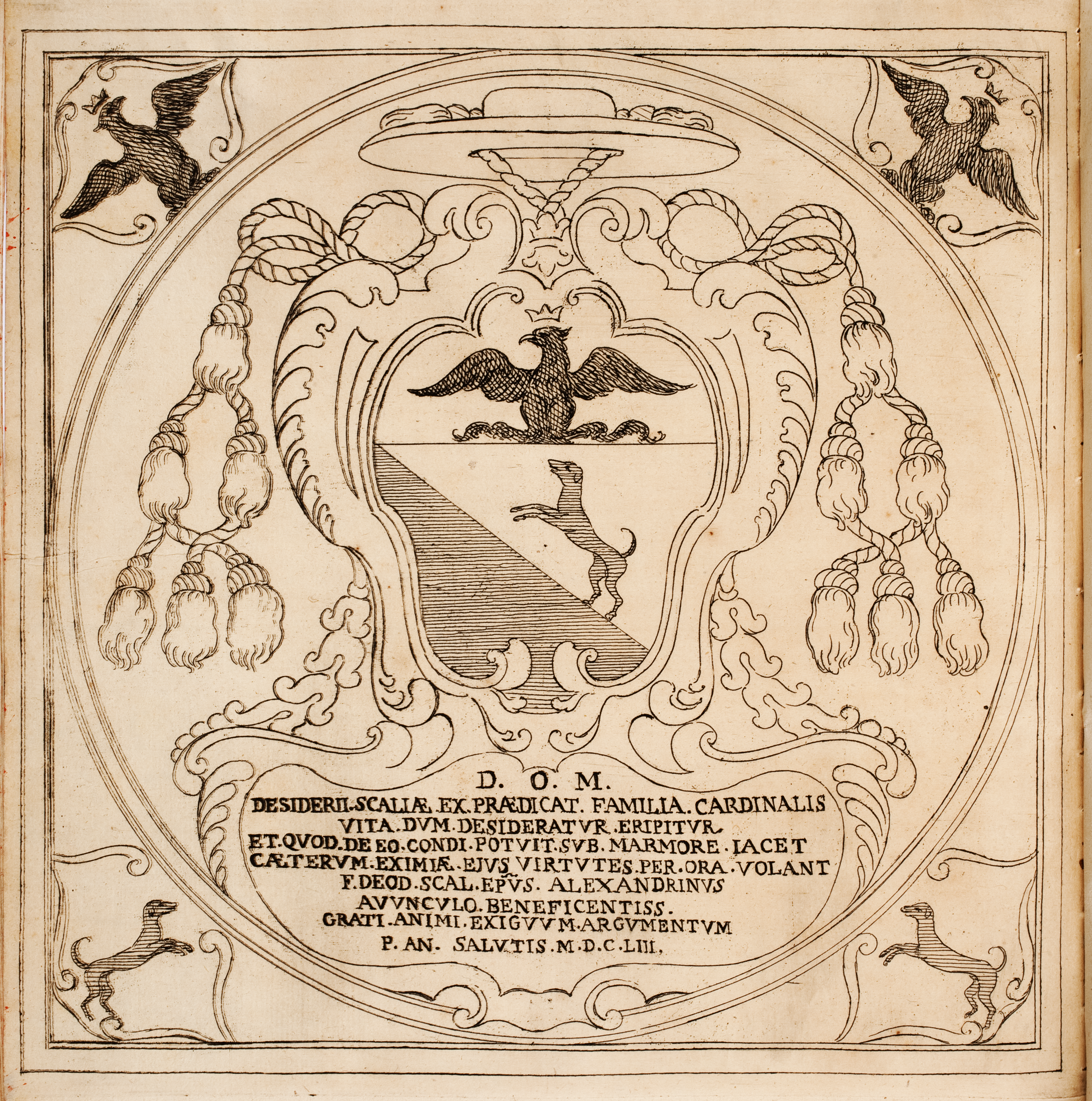
Memorial plaque for Desiderio Scaglia erected in 1653 by his nephew Deodato Scaglia, bishop of Alessandria.

Desiderio Scaglia (1567 – 21 August 1639), also known as the Cardinal of Cremona, was an Italian cardinal and bishop. He was a relative of cardinals Girolamo Bernerio, Scipione Cobelluzzi and Francesco Cennini de' Salamandri and was a member of the Dominican Order.

== Biography ==
Desiderio Scaglia was born in 1567 at Cremona, part of the Duchy of Milan (currently in the province of Cremona in Lombardy, Italy). He was a professor in the Dominican houses of study in Cremona and other cities in Lombardy. He was a well-known theologian and preacher during his time. During the pontificate of Pope Clement VIII, he was named inquisitor in the dioceses of Pavia, Cremona and Milan. In 1616 he was called to Rome and named commissary of the Roman Inquisition. In this role, he was among the judges who presided over the trial against Galileo and signed his condemnation.

Pope Paul V created him a cardinal at the consistory of 11 January 1621.

Cardinal Scaglia was ordained bishop by Giambattista Cardinal Leni on 16 May 1621. He was appointed bishop of Melfi and Rapolla in 1621 and transferred to the diocese of Como the following year. He gave up the diocese of Como in 1632–1633 when was Camerlengo of the Sacred College of Cardinals.

He participated in the conclave of 1621 which elected Pope Gregory XV and that of 1623 which elected Pope Urban VIII.

He died in Rome on 21 August 1639 at the age of 72.

== See also ==
- Catholic Church hierarchy
- College of Cardinals
- List of living cardinals
- Politics of Vatican City
- Roman Curia
