= Serafino Secchi =

Serafino Secchi (died 1628) was the Master of the Order of Preachers from 1612 to 1628.

He was from Pavia and a member of the Dominican Order. Immediately before being elected master at the chapter of 1612, he had been the procurator general of the previous master, Agostino Galamini. At the chapter of 1612, Philip III of Spain pushed for a Spanish candidate for master, but the chapter nevertheless chose Secchi, another Italian.

While he was master, the French nicknamed him "Le Sec" (The Dry One) because of his good memory and attention to detail. During his mastership, all non-Dominicans were barred from preaching in Dominican churches. He created special courses on preaching for the first time in the order's history. He forbade any member of the order to appeal to the Holy See without having first appealed a case to the order's procurator general.

He died in 1628.

Catholic Church titles
Preceded by Agostino Galamini	Master of the Order of Preachers; 1612–1628	Succeeded by Niccolò Ridolfi
