= Giulio Roma =

Italian Cardinal

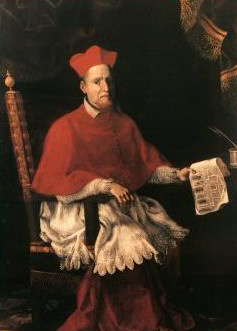
Giulio Roma

Giulio Roma (16 September 1584 – 16 September 1652) was an Italian Catholic Cardinal and Bishop of Recanati and Loreto.

Roma was born 16 September 1584 in Milan, one of 16 children born to noble parents. He was educated at the University of Pavia and the University of Perugia.

At a young age he became a chamberlain to Cardinal Federico Borromeo, Archbishop of Milan. Thereafter he went to Rome and had an audience with Pope Paul V, who asked him to move to Rome and named him a consistorial lawyer in 1607. He was named Governor of Orvieto in 1618, Governor of Camerino in 1619 and Governor of Perugia in 1619, where he stayed until 1621 when he was elevated to cardinal on 11 January. He was installed as Cardinal-Priest at the Basilica of Santa Maria sopra Minerva.

In 1621 he was ordained Bishop of Recanati and Loreto, a position he held until his death. He participated in the papal conclaves of 1621 and 1623. In 1634 he was appointed Bishop of Tivoli, where he rebuilt the cathedral, and was responsible for commissioning the reconstruction of Alba Cathedral. In 1639 he was appointed Cardinal-Priest at the Basilica of Santa Prassede.

He opted for an appointment as Cardinal-Bishop of Frascati in July 1644, but within months Pope Urban VIII was dead and a new Pope was required. He participated in the papal conclave of 1644 and the following year he was appointed Cardinal-Bishop of Porto-Santa Rufina.

Roma was appointed Vice-Dean and then Dean of the College of Cardinals in April 1652, but died a few months later on 16 September, the day of his 68th birthday.

Catholic Church titles
Preceded by Ladislao d'Aquino	Cardinal-Priest at the Basilica of Saint Mary Above Minerva; 1621 - 1639	Succeeded by Giovanni Battista Altieri
Preceded by Giulio Savelli	Cardinal-Bishop of Frascati; 1644 - 1645	Succeeded by Carlo de' Medici
Preceded by Francesco Cennini de' Salamandri	Cardinal-Bishop of Porto-Santa Rufina; 1645 - 1652	Succeeded by Carlo de Medici
Preceded by Marcello Lante della Rovere	Dean of the College of Cardinals; 1652	Succeeded by Carlo de Medici
