= Ripatransone Cathedral =

Roman Catholic cathedral in Marche, Italy

Coordinates: 42.9991°N 13.7610°E

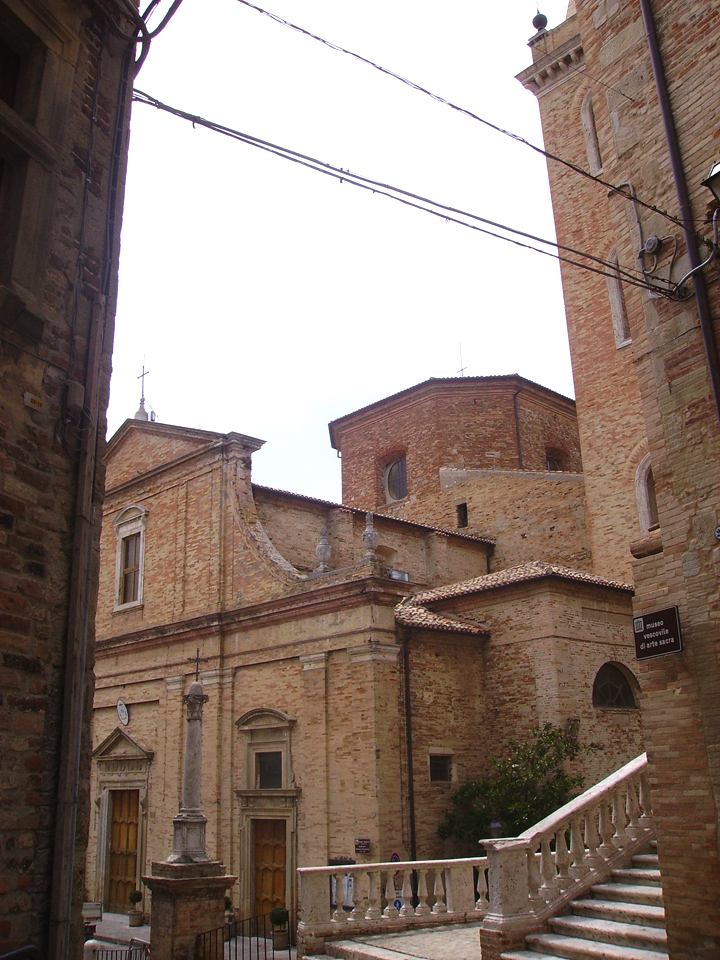
Ripatransome Cathedral.

Ripatransone Cathedral (Italian: Duomo di Ripatransone; Basilica Concattedrale dei Santi Gregorio Magno e Margherita) is a Roman Catholic cathedral and minor basilica in the town of Ripatransone, province of Ascoli Piceno, region of Marche, Italy. It is located on Piazza Ascanio Condivi. The cathedral is dedicated to Saint Gregory the Great and to Saint Margaret. It was formerly the episcopal seat of the Diocese of Ripatransone but is now a co-cathedral in the Diocese of San Benedetto del Tronto-Ripatransone-Montalto.

== History and decoration ==
The main layout of the cathedral was erected between 1597 and 1623 by the architect Giuseppe Guerra. The octagonal tiburium (corridor across base of cupola drum) dates to 1786, the Neoclassical façade to 1842, while the bell-tower was built from 1884 to 1902. The architect of the latter was F. Vespignani.

The interior was frescoed in the 1950s by the brothers Michelangelo and Marcantonio Bedini. The spandrels depict the four evangelists. while in the dome are the four cardinal virtues. They also painted the apse frescoes. The wooden pulpit with panels depicting the five glorious mysteries was carved by D. Bonfini of Patrignone. The apse has wooden choir stalls (1620) by Agostilio Evangelisti.

The main altar has two paintings, a 17th-century canvas depicting San Gregorio Magno and an 18th-century Nativity. Among other works in the church are a polychrome wooden crucifix putatively donated by Pope Pius V in 1571 and attributed to Giovanni Battista Casignola. There is also an altarpiece by Orazio Gentileschi. There are three canvases depicting the Madonna and Child, St Peter, St Roch, St Antony of Padua, and John the Baptist (1579) by Simone de Magistris; a Carlo Borromeo (1623) attributed to Alessandro Turchi; and an altarpiece S. Ciannavei di Ascoli Piceno (active 18th–19th centuries).

The musical organ (1783) was made by the Venetian Gaetano Callido. It was originally made for the Church of the Magdalene (Chiesa della Maddalena) of the Franciscans.

From the cathedral one can enter the Diocesan Sanctuary of the Madonna, known also as the Sanctuary of San Giovanni (patroness of the city since 1893). The sanctuary was erected in 1846–58 by design of G. Carducci of Fermo, and it houses four statues by Luigi Fontana. The aedicule, designed by Francesco Vespignani in 1881, houses the venerated Simulacro (1620), a work of S. Sebastiani. The crypt of the cathedral has a polychrome ceramic crucifix by Giuseppe Marinucci.
