= Niccolò Ridolfi (Dominican) =

Niccolò Ridolfi was the Master of the Order of Preachers from 1629 to 1642.

== Early biography ==
Niccolò Ridolfi was born into a Florentine noble family. He was a penitent of Philip Neri.

== Formation ==
Ridolfi joined the Dominican Order. Ridolfi was a student at the College of St. Thomas, and became rector there in 1630.

Under Pope Urban VIII, he was Master of the Sacred Palace.

At a chapter held in 1629, he was elected master of his order. He created a fund for the Master by sending out collectors to take funds from the provinces; he used this money to aid poorer houses, novitiates, publications, and building and ornamenting churches. He completed a visitation of northern Italy and part of the Kingdom of France.

In 1630 Ridolfi became rector of the College of St. Thomas, the future Pontifical University of Saint Thomas Aquinas, Angelicum, where he had been an alumnus.

Initially a supporter of Ridolfi, Pope Urban VIII grew disillusioned with Ridolfi because Ridolfi opposed plans to further advance Urban's family, the Barberinis. As such, the pope had Ridolfi deposed at a chapter held in Genoa in 1642. He was subsequently imprisoned in San Sisto Vecchio.

Ridolfi is author of the Apologia perfectionis vitae spiritualis (1632)

Catholic Church titles
Preceded by Serafino Secchi	Master of the Order of Preachers; 1629–1642	Succeeded by Tommaso Turco
