= Brandimarte Tommasi =

Most Reverend Brandimarte Tommasi
- Auxiliary Bishop of Sabina; Titular Bishop of Salamis
- Church: Catholic Church
- Diocese: Diocese of Sabina
- In office: 1633–1648

Orders
- Consecration: Marcello Lante della Rovere by 9 October 1633

Personal details
- Born: 1591 Ripatransone, Italy
- Died: 22 July 1648 (age 57) Magliano Sabina, Italy

Brandimarte Tommasi (1591–1648) was a Roman Catholic prelate who served as Auxiliary Bishop of Sabina (1633–1648) and Titular Bishop of Salamis (1633–1648).

== Biography ==
Brandimarte Tommasi was born in Ripatransone, Italy in 1591. On 26 September 1633, he was appointed by Pope Urban VIII as Titular Bishop of Salamis and Auxiliary Bishop of Sabina. On 9 October 1633, he was consecrated bishop by Marcello Lante della Rovere, Cardinal-Bishop of Frascati.

He served as Auxiliary Bishop of Sabina until his death on 22 July 1648. He is buried in the cathedral of San Liberatore in Magliano Sabina.

Catholic Church titles
Preceded by	Auxiliary Bishop of Sabina; 1633–1648	Succeeded by
Preceded by Giovanni Battista Piccolomini	Titular Bishop of Salamis; 1633–1648	Succeeded by Quintilianus Gentilucci
