= Ripatransone =

- Comune
- Comune di Ripatransone
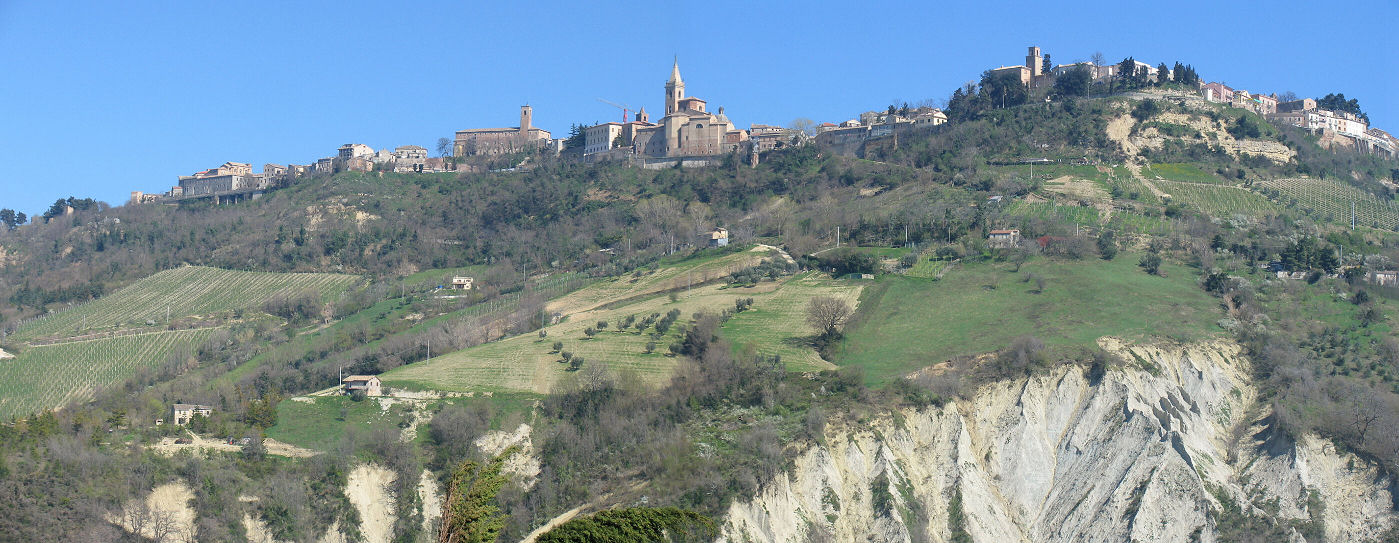

- Coat of arms

- Location within Italy Location within Marche
- Coordinates: 43°0′N 13°46′E
- Country: Italy
- Region: Marche
- Province: Ascoli Piceno (AP)
- Frazioni: Carmine, Messieri, Petrella, San Salvatore, San Savino, Trivio, Valtesino

Government
  - Mayor: Alessandro Lucciarini de Vincenz

Area
  - Total: 74.28 km^{2} (28.68 sq mi)
- Elevation: 494 m (1,621 ft)

Population (1 January 2008)
  - Total: 4,232
  - Density: 56.97/km^{2} (147.6/sq mi)
- Demonym: Ripani
- Time zone: UTC+1 (CET)
  - Summer (DST): UTC+2 (CEST)
- Postal code: 63038
- Dialing code: 0735
- Patron saint: Mary Magdalene
- Saint day: July 22
- Website: Official website

Ripatransone is a comune (municipality) in the Province of Ascoli Piceno in the Italian region Marche, located about 70 kilometres (43 mi) southeast of Ancona and about 20 kilometres (12 mi) northeast of Ascoli Piceno.

== History ==
The hill of Ripatransone (whose name means "rock of Transone", Transone being a local feudal lord who founded the castle here) has been inhabited since prehistorical times, and was settled first by the Umbri and then the Piceni. After the Roman conquest it lost importance, regaining it in the Middle Ages when several castles were built here, being unified into a single town in 1096. In 1205 it was a free commune, existing in particular rivalry with Fermo and against Francesco Sforza. In 1571 it was given the status of City and that of diocesan see by Pope Pius V. After the Renaissance it was part of the Papal States, becoming part of unified Italy in 1860. However, the Unification of Italy did not bring immediate benefits. Only after the conquest of Rome the economic and social life of Ripa (and the Marche in general) woke up, until the city experienced a new youth. The factors that most influenced the renewed splendor of Ripatransone, whose population grew unceasingly, were the new impulse of agriculture and the investment in the education sector that made it an important center of studies. It was after the two world wars and the Fascist period that, thanks to the economic boom, the emigration and depopulation of the countryside caused a new sudden demographic collapse. Only from the end of the 20th century to the early years of the 21st, also thanks to the event of immigration from abroad, the municipality no longer loses its inhabitants and sees prospects of repopulation.

=== Municipal coat-of-arms ===
The coat of arms consists of a shield depicting a silver lion passing through with a golden lily in the right front paw, on five necks in a red background. The coat of arms is surmounted by the crown of the City and surrounded by laurel fronds, one of which is sometimes replaced by an oak branch. The hills represent the five traditional hills of the city: Belvedere, Monte Antico, Capodimonte, Roflano and Agello.

== Climate ==
The climate of Ripatransone is close to the Mediterranean: winters are colder and, although the hilly altitude limits the frequency of snowfalls, they occur more or less annually and can also be intense and lasting. Summers are generally cooler and more airy, with temperatures that are still quite high.

== Main sights ==
After Ascoli Piceno, Ripatransone is the largest historical center of the province, and its monumental appearance derives from the importance of the city in the past. The town's layout is medieval, and there are numerous remains of ancient fortifications. The Corso Vittorio Emanuele cuts the village longitudinally for about a kilometer, flanked by tall noble palaces of various ages.

=== Religious architecture ===
- Ripatransone Cathedral (1597)

Ripatransone Cathedral is a Roman Catholic cathedral and minor basilica in the town of Ripatransone, province of Ascoli Piceno, region of Marche, Italy. It is located on Piazza Ascanio Condivi. The cathedral is dedicated to Saint Gregory the Great and to Saint Margaret. It was formerly the episcopal seat of the Diocese of Ripatransone but is now a co-cathedral in the Diocese of San Benedetto del Tronto-Ripatransone-Montalto.

- Romanesque church of San Michele Arcangelo, with some 15th- and 16th-century paintings

Romanesque, with a single nave, preserves paintings from the fourteenth and sixteenth centuries and a baptismal font in the shape of a chalice which is the oldest in Ripatransone.

=== Civil architecture ===
- The medieval walls
- The narrowest alley in Italy

The narrowest alley in Italy is located in Ripatransone, a small town of a 4000 inhabitants in the province of Ascoli Piceno in the Marche region. This alley is situated in the Roflano area. The alley is 43 cm width but in some parts it narrows to 38 cm. However, in Italy there are no formal requirements for this status, thus, the street does not have an official recognition. This street was found in 1968, at that time it did not have a name.

- Palazzo del Podestà
- Communal Palace (13th century)

== Palazzo Bonomi-Gera ==
Palazzo Bonomi Gera Civic Museum overlooks Corso Vittorio Emanuele II. The palace was designed at the end of the 17th century by Luzio Bonomi (1669-1739). In 1963-1966, following the purchase by the magistrate Uno Gera, structural restoration interventions were carried out. In 1971, Uno Gera donated both the palace and its art collection to the community. Since 1976 the building has been assigned to the new seat of the Civic Art Gallery.

== Twin towns ==
- Sapri, Italy, since 1996
- Zakynthos, Greece, since 1996

== People ==
- Agata Ciabattoni, mathematician
- Brandimarte Tommasi (1591–1648), Roman Catholic prelate
