= Castiglioncello del Trinoro =

- Frazione
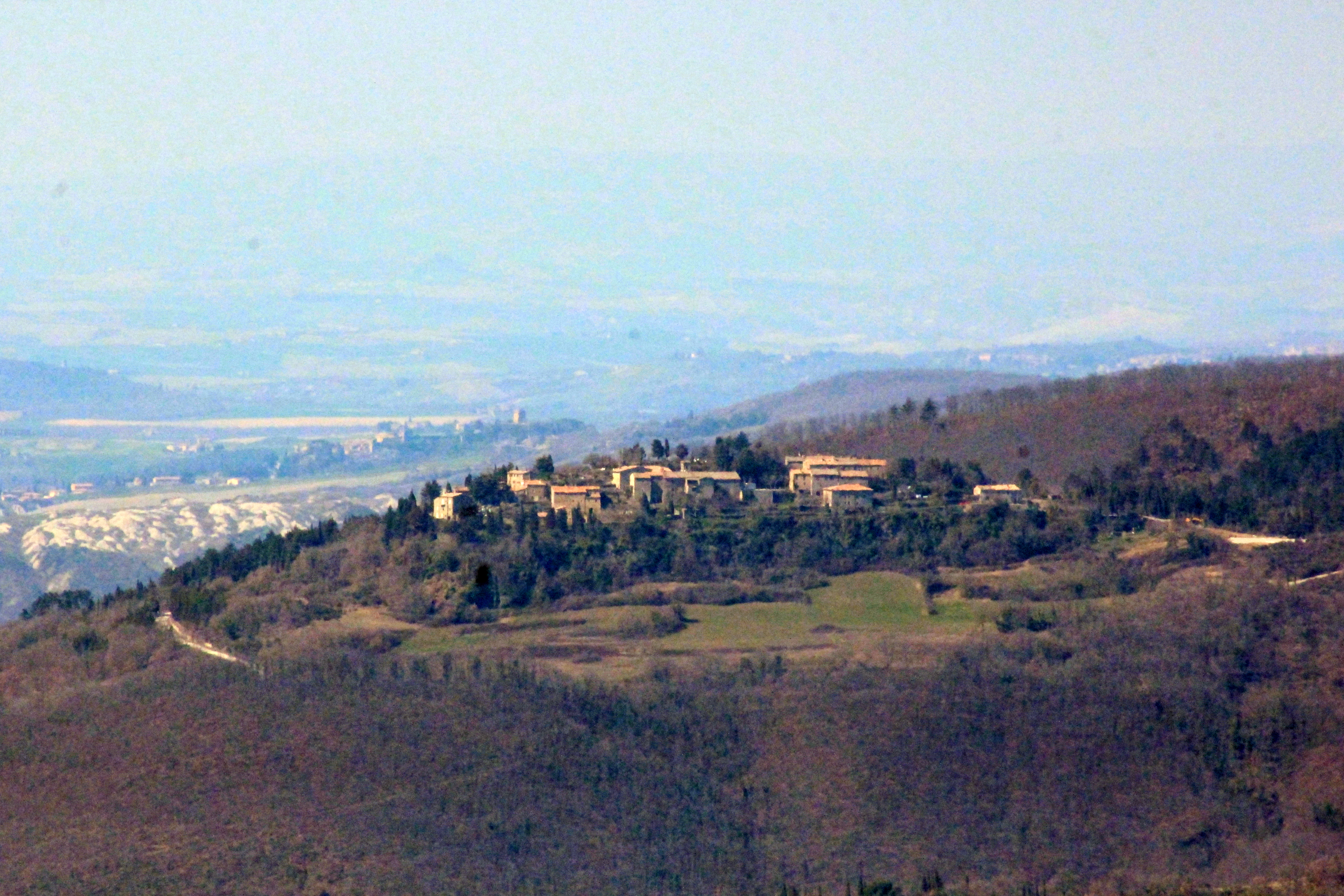
- View of Castiglioncello del Trinoro

- Location of Castiglioncello del Trinoro in Italy
- Coordinates: 42°59′29″N 11°48′47″E
- Country: Italy
- Region: Tuscany
- Province: Siena (SI)
- Comune: Sarteano
- Elevation: 786 m (2,579 ft)

Population (2016)
  - Total: 14
- Demonym: Castiglioncellesi
- Time zone: UTC+1 (CET)
  - Summer (DST): UTC+2 (CEST)

Castiglioncello del Trinoro is a village in Tuscany, central Italy, administratively a frazione of the comune of Sarteano, province of Siena. At the time of the 2016 its population was 14.

Castiglioncello del Trinoro is about 70 km from Siena and 6 km from Sarteano.
