= Sarteano =

- Comune
- Comune di Sarteano
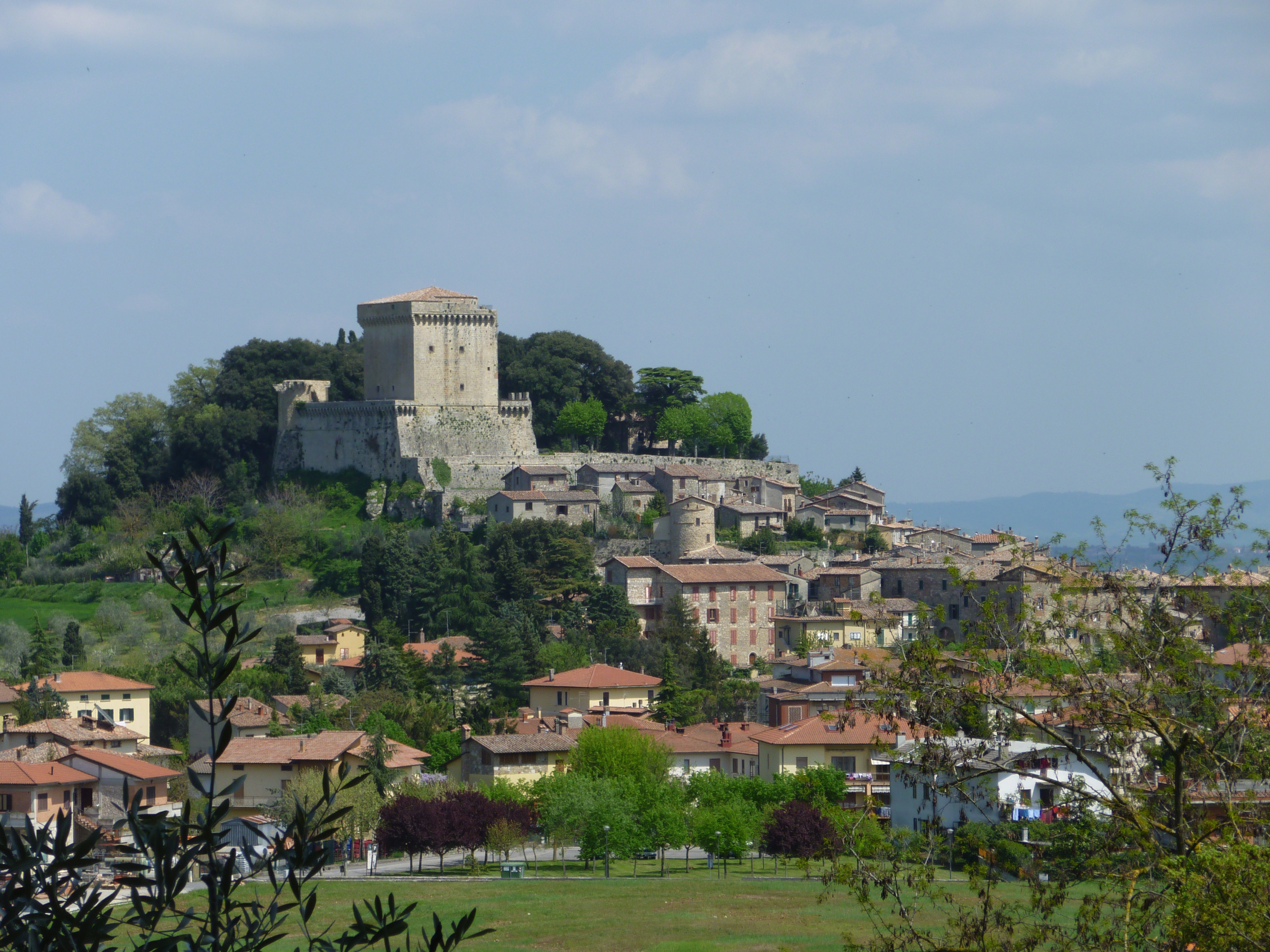
- Panorama of Sarteano

- Flag Coat of arms

- Location within Italy Location within Tuscany
- Coordinates: 42°59′N 11°52′E
- Country: Italy
- Region: Tuscany
- Province: Siena (SI)
- Frazioni: Castiglioncello del Trinoro, Casa Bebi II, Fonte Della Regina, Fonte Vetriana, Lago, Valverde

Government
  - Mayor: Francesco Landi

Area
  - Total: 84.84 km^{2} (32.76 sq mi)
- Elevation: 573 m (1,880 ft)

Population (1 January 2021)
  - Total: 4,533
  - Density: 53.43/km^{2} (138.4/sq mi)
- Demonym: Sarteanese(i)
- Time zone: UTC+1 (CET)
  - Summer (DST): UTC+2 (CEST)
- Postal code: 53047
- Dialing code: 0578
- Website: Official website

Sarteano is a comune (municipality) in the Province of Siena in the Italian region Tuscany, located about 100 kilometres (62 mi) southeast of Florence and about 60 kilometres (37 mi) southeast of Siena.

Sarteano is particularly important from the historical point of view. Located between Val d'Orcia and Valdichiana, the area of Sarteano has been inhabited for thousands of years. For this reason, Sarteano has a very rich archeology. In particular, some of the most important Etruscan tombs of Tuscany are located in the countryside around Sarteano. A large portion of the archeological objects found in the area form the collection of the Museo civico archeologico di Sarteano.

Sarteano borders the following municipalities: Cetona, Chianciano Terme, Chiusi, Pienza, Radicofani, and San Casciano dei Bagni.
