= Pietro Campori =

Italian cardinal

His Eminence Pietro Campori
- Bishop of Cremona; Cardinal Priest of San Tommaso in Parione
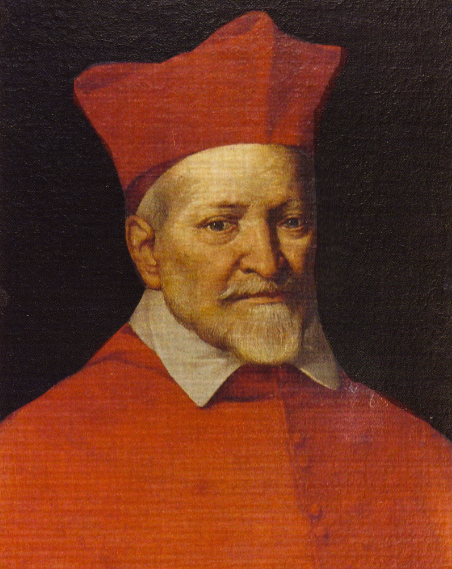
- Diocese: Diocese of Cremona

Orders
- Consecration: 17 May 1621 by Giambattista Leni
- Created cardinal: 19 September 1616 by Pope Paul V
- Rank: Cardinal-Priest

Personal details
- Born: c. 1553
- Died: 4 February 1643 (aged 89–90)
- Denomination: Catholic Church

Pietro Campori (c. 1553 – 4 February 1643) was an Italian cardinal of the Catholic Church and Bishop of Cremona. He was friends with Scipione Borghese, the nephew of Pope Paul V, and was a candidate for election to the papacy twice, in the conclaves of 1621 and 1623, respectively.

== Early career ==
Campori studied canon law in Lucca and Pisa, and moved to Rome after he was ordained a priest. In Rome, he worked with Cesare Speciano and went with him to Spain when Speciano was appointed the papal nuncio there in 1585, and served there as his priest secretary. He stayed in Spain with Speciano and was eventually granted a pension by Philip II of Spain. In 1596, he was made a noble by Rudolf II, Holy Roman Emperor.

Upon returning to Italy, Campori assisted Speciano in the latter's new role as the Bishop of Cremona. He took part in the synods of that diocese in 1599 and 1604, and was named a canon of its cathedral in 1600. Upon Speciano's death in 1607, Campori returned to Rome.

In Rome, Campori served as the private secretary and major domo for Paul V's nephew Scipione Borghese. Additionally, from 1609 to 1617, he served as the general preceptor for the Order of the Holy Ghost, a religious order that provided healthcare. Pope Paul V created Campori Cardinal Priest of San Tommaso in Parione in 1616.

== Cardinalate ==
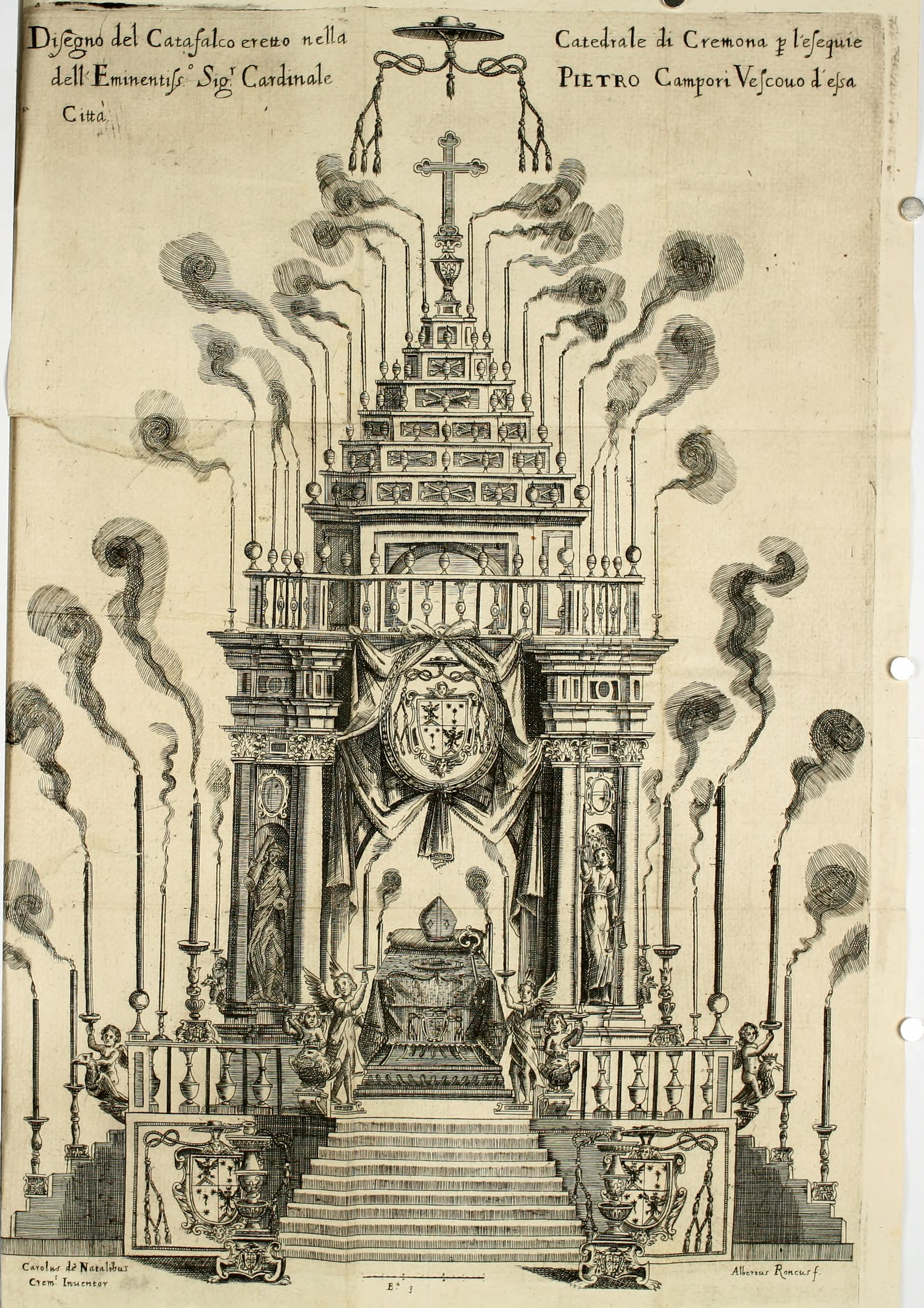
Funeral rites, image from a work by Pietro Campori

Borghese had promoted Campori as a candidate for pope in both the 1621 papal conclave following Paul V's death and the 1623 papal conclave. In 1621, Campori received support from the cardinals created by Paul V and was an acceptable choice to the Habsburgs. He was opposed by the cardinals from Venice, who had been ordered to vote against him, and the French ambassador attempted to undermine his election. Additionally, Pietro Aldobrandini, the nephew of Pope Clement VIII, opposed the election of any creation of Paul V, and was carried into the conclave on a litter despite being sick. Borghese wanted to have Campori elected by acclamation on the first night of the conclave, but the ambassador of Louis XIII of France had a letter excluding Campori from election to the papacy, and waited for cardinals opposed to Campori to arrive before leaving a vote so as not to have to formally exclude him. When the initial scrutiny did not elect Campori, Borghese did not attempt to promote him further, hoping that he would eventually be elected if the conclave deadlocked.

Campori was not elected pope, but instead Alessandro Ludovisi was elected, taking the name Pope Gregory XV. After his election over Campori, Gregory named the latter Bishop of Cremona on 17 May 1621.

In 1623, Campori was also Borghese's favoured candidate, but it became clear after the first scrutiny that another member of the party loyal to Borghese had the best chance of being elected, and Borghese shifted his support.

== Notes ==
Records
Preceded by Agostino Galamini	Oldest living Member of the Sacred College; 6 September 1639 - 4 February 1643	Succeeded by François de La Rochefoucauld
