= Andrea Baroni Peretti Montalto =

17th-century Roman Catholic cardinal

His Eminence Andrea Baroni Peretti
- Cardinal-Bishop of Frascati
- Church: Catholic Church

Orders
- Consecration: 30 November 1624 by Sebastiano Poggi

Personal details
- Born: 29 November 1572 Montalto delle Marche, Italy
- Died: 4 August 1629 (aged 56) Italy

Andrea Baroni Peretti (1572–1629) was a Catholic cardinal.

== Biography ==
On 30 November 1624, he was consecrated bishop by Sebastiano Poggi, Bishop Emeritus of Ripatransone, with Lorenzo Azzolini, Bishop of Ripatransone, and Aloysius Galli, Bishop of Ancona e Numana, serving as co-consecrators.
