= 1644 conclave =

Election of Catholic Pope Innocent X

Papal conclave August–September 1644

Dates and location
- 9 August – 15 September 1644; Apostolic Palace, Papal States

Key officials
- Dean: Marcello Lante della Rovere
- Sub-dean: Pier Paolo Crescenzi
- Camerlengo: Antonio Barberini
- Protopriest: Luigi Capponi
- Protodeacon: Carlo de’ Medici

Election
- Vetoed: Giulio Cesare Sacchetti

Elected pope
- Giovanni Pamphili; Name taken: Innocent X
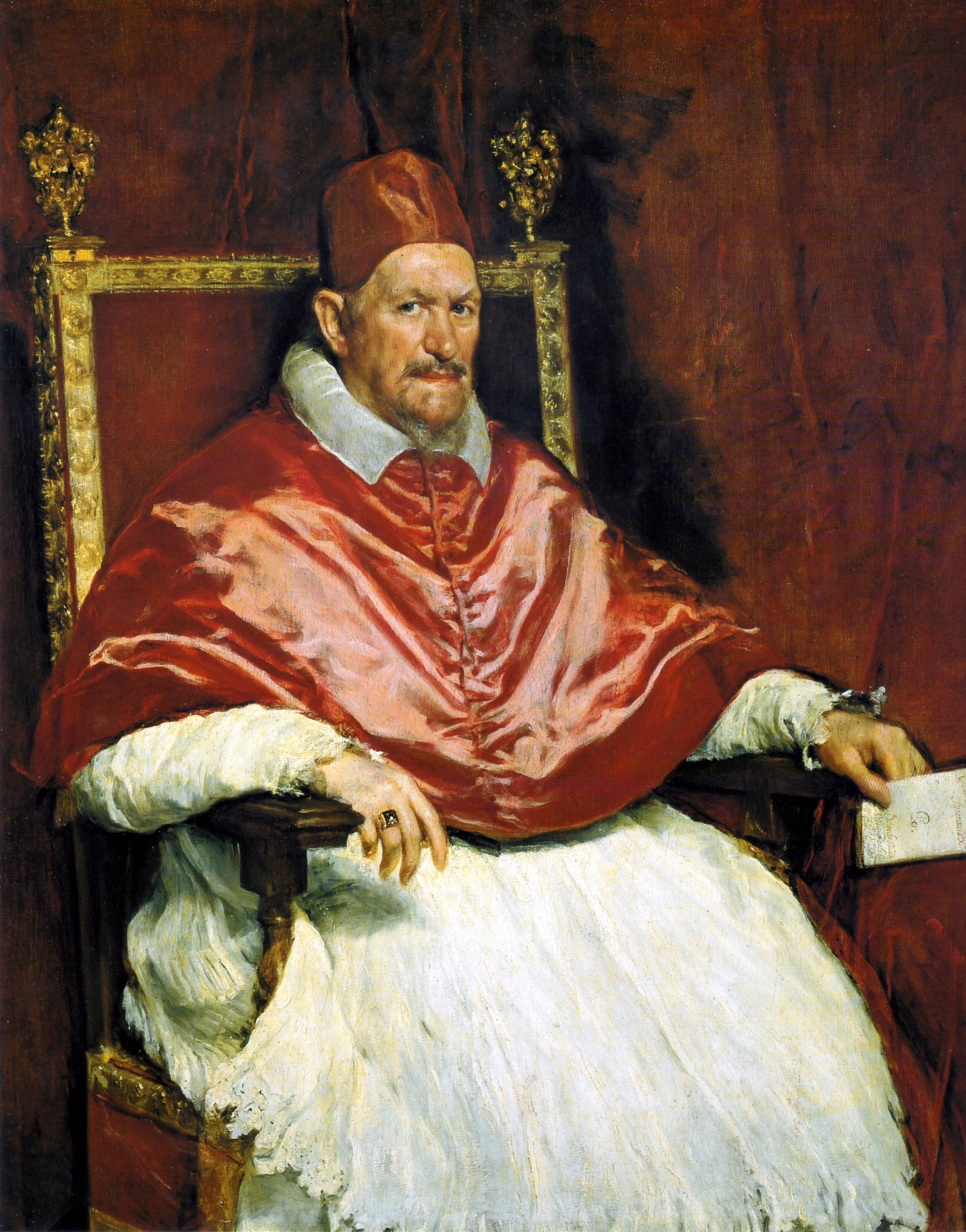

The 1644 papal conclave was called upon the death of Pope Urban VIII. It lasted from 9 August to 15 September 1644; the cardinal electors chose Cardinal Giovanni Pamphili, who took office as Pope Innocent X.

== Background ==
Pope Urban VIII died on July 29, 1644. His reign, which included the costly First War of Castro, had been financially troubling for Rome and for the Roman Catholic Church. The conflict for control of the Church between Spain and France and the ongoing Thirty Years' War meant many cardinals arrived at the conclave seeking a compromise that would bring stability to the Church.

But Urban's reign had also subjected the Church to his notorious nepotism. He had appointed three family members as Cardinals; his brother Antonio Marcello Barberini and his two nephews, Francesco Barberini and Antonio Barberini. His nephews, especially, were keen to retain the wealth, power and property they had amassed during their uncle's reign and both sought to move the conclave in their favour.

They started by hiring, it was rumoured, bands of brigands and mercenaries to roam the streets of the city causing trouble, creating noise and generally making it uncomfortable for the cardinals inside the conclave.

== Conclave ==
Anne of Austria, French Queen Mother and sister to Philip IV of Spain, was adamant that none of the older cardinals appointed by the pro-Spanish Pope Paul V should be elected to the Papal throne.

Francesco Barberini sided with the cardinals loyal to Spain. Urban VIII had been a strong francophile and the mood of the conclave was with Spain from the beginning. Antonio, at the direction of Cardinal Jules Mazarin, sided with the cardinals loyal to France and was supported with funding from the French with which he was to buy wavering votes. Maria Antonietta Visceglia suggests that it may have been part of Spain's strategy to split the influence of the Barberini family.

With the Habsburgs in Spain as well as the Empire, the results of a papal election often depended on the strength, or lack thereof, of anti-Spain groups, and whether these could unite. Conclave protodeacon Cardinal Carlo de' Medici led a prestigious coalition of non-aligned Italian cardinal-princes connected to the Roman aristocracy. Urban's practice of concentrating power and curial appointments in his family and those related to his relatives came as a disappointment to those very cardinal-princes instrumental in his election.

Antonio Barberini continued to promote the candidacy of Cardinal Sacchetti, in accordance with the French policy. Urban VIII and his family had been so overly partial to the French that the Imperialists and the Spanish were determined that no supporter of French interests would be elected. On August 9, Spain's Cardinal Gil de Albornoz presented a veto against Sacchetti, signed by the king. Cardinal Antonio Barberini let it be known that the Barberini were prepared to stay in conclave until everyone died before they allowed someone who was not a member of their faction to be elected pope, and that their candidate was Sacchetti. The effect, however, was to increase opposition to Sacchetti.

The French Ambassador, Saint-Chamont, became alarmed by reports of the movement of Spanish Neapolitan troops on the southern border of the Papal States. He feared that this might be an invasion, with the purpose of capturing the College of Cardinals and forcing the election of a pope favorable to the Spanish interest. He assured the Cardinals the full support of the French, and informed them that the Marshal de Brézé was at Marseille, with a fleet and troops, prepared to rush to the assistance of the College of Cardinals. There were also French troops in Lombardy and Savoy who could be called upon to defend the Papal States if necessary. Similar assurances were offered by the Spanish ambassador and the Prince of Parma. Nothing came of the saber-rattling, except to unnerve some members of the Sacred College.

Cardinal Mazarin was furious and blamed the ambassador who in turn claimed Antonio Barberini had included the clause is his own agreement as an excuse for turning on the French and siding with the Spanish. Mazarin, keen to remain on good terms with the Barberini, recalled the ambassador and continued to support the Barberini. Mazarin later provided shelter for the Barberini nephews (including the cardinals' brother, Taddeo Barberini) after Innocent X had them investigated and exiled to Paris.

== Election of Innocent X ==
Though it's likely he didn't have to, Francesco Barberini countered with a generous offer from the Spanish delegation, which included a promise of the protection of the King Philip IV of Spain for the Barberini (including Francesco himself). Antonio and his delegation agreed and the following morning, on 15 September 1644, Pamphili was elected and took the papal throne as Pope Innocent X.

Among Innocent X's first orders of business was to order the removal of the soldiers guarding the various palaces, princes, ambassadors and other notables. He also disbanded the conscripted mounted troops and foot soldiers so that Rome would be less of an armed camp.

Furious at the power Innocent's election gave to his already-powerful sister-in-law, Olimpia Maidalchini, Cardinal Alessandro Bichi was said to have exclaimed, "We have just elected a female pope". Supporters of Bichi and the French delegation hung banners in churches calling her "Pope Olimpia I".
