= 1623 conclave =

Election of Catholic Pope Urban VIII

Papal conclave July–August 1623

Dates and location
- 19 July – 6 August 1623; Apostolic Palace, Papal States

Elected pope
- Maffeo Barberini; Name taken: Urban VIII
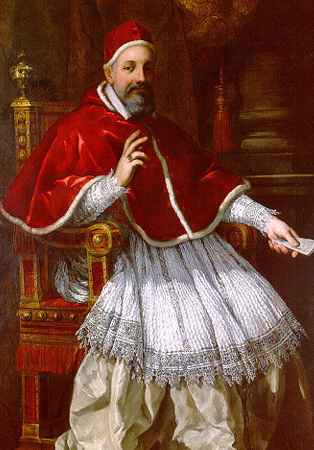

The 1623 papal conclave was convened on the death of Pope Gregory XV and ended with the election of Cardinal Maffeo Barberini as Pope Urban VIII. It was the first conclave to take place after the reforms that Gregory XV issued in his 1621 bull Aeterni Patris Filius.

== Background ==
After his election, Gregory XV had reformed the papal conclave system with his bull Aeterni Patris Filius of 1621, which was intended to streamline the conclave process, and this was the first papal election to follow these reforms.

Following the 1605 conclaves, papal elections had become standardized despite not being hereditary. The typical pope during the 200 years following Paul V's election that year was around seventy and had been a cardinal for a decade after a career as a canon lawyer. Popes typically came from the second-tier nobility of Rome or the Papal States.

== Conclave ==
Fifty-four cardinals participated in the conclave which took place from 19 July to 6 August, following the death of Gregory XV. Among them were four Spanish cardinals and three German cardinals, but none from France.

The cardinals were primarily split in factions between those created by popes before Pope Paul V was elected in 1605, who numbered thirteen, those created by Paul, who numbered thirty-two, and those created by Gregory XV, who numbered nine. The two cardinals who had the most influence over the conclave were Scipione Borghese, the nephew of Paul V, and Ludovico Ludovisi, the nephew of Gregory XV. Ludovisi attempted to increase his influence over the conclave by becoming allies with the cardinals who originated from regions controlled by the Habsburgs.

Borghese had supported Pietro Campori in the previous conclave, which had elected Gregory XV, and Campori was his preferred candidate during this conclave as well. It was anticipated that Campori's age of 66 would be a benefit, because a Spanish memorandum had revealed that they viewed older cardinals as less likely to develop an independent foreign policy as pope. Because the French influence in this election was not expected to be much, Borghese anticipated that electing Campori pope would be easier, since French opposition had been the main thing preventing it in the previous conclave.

The first scrutiny of the conclave was significant because it revealed that Gregory XV's reform intended to discourage cardinals from voting for their friends in the first round had not been successful. The second scrutiny revealed to Borghese that Giovanni Garzia Mellini was the candidate from the Borghese party that had the most support among electors. Ludovisi was opposed to Mellini, and he spread rumours amongst the cardinals that Borghese would rather die than see anyone outside of his faction becoming pope. These rumours caused other cardinals to lose good will towards Borghese, coupled with the alleged fact that the summer heat had begun to exhaust them.

== Election of Urban VIII ==
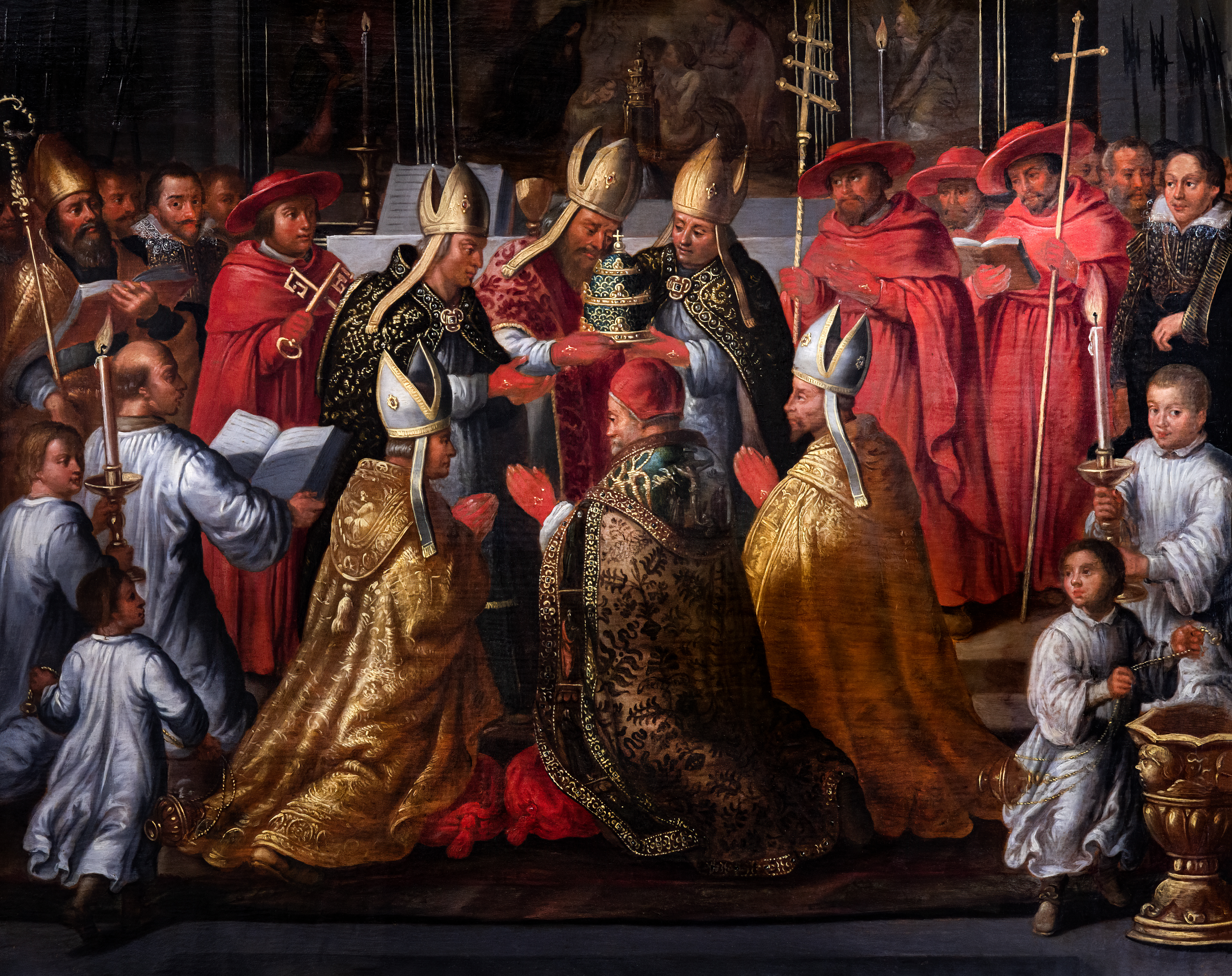
Coronation of Pope Urban VIII in 1623

After candidates from both major factions had been rejected by the electors, Borghese began to look for neutral candidates including Maffeo Barberini. Barberini began openly campaigning for his own election, which had not been seen in previous conclaves. Barberini had been friends with Maurice of Savoy, who served as the spokesman for the cardinals supporting France during the conclave. He also received the support of Ludovisi, which caused Borghese to oppose him. Borghese had contracted an illness during the conclave, and in order to leave he agreed to the election of Barberini and instructed his cardinals to vote for Barberini's election.

In the next scrutiny, Barberini received enough votes for election, but there was one ballot missing. The cardinals disputed what to do for two hours, and eventually Barberini requested a second scrutiny, which he won with fifty out of the fifty-four cardinals present. The relative speed of Urban's election has been attributed to the summer heat that the cardinals were forced to endure during the process.

Upon his election, Barberini took the name of Urban VIII. Barberini had previously served as the papal nuncio to France under Paul V, and had been created a cardinal because of his service there, and his election pleased King Louis XIII. During Paul V's papacy Urban was noted in a series of biographies on potential cardinal electors for being a writer and poet. The symbol of his family was the bee, and his election was afterwards said by Romans to have been foretold by a swarm of bees entering the conclave. Following the election, eight cardinals died within two weeks, but the new pope survived despite catching malaria during the conclave.
