= Andrea Pierbenedetti =

Roman Catholic prelate

Most Reverend Andrea Pierbenedetti
- Bishop of Venosa
- Church: Catholic Church
- Diocese: Diocese of Venosa
- In office: 1611–1634
- Predecessor: Mario Moro (bishop)
- Successor: Bartolomeo Frigerio

Orders
- Consecration: 20 March 1611 by Giovanni Garzia Mellini

Personal details
- Born: 1568 Camerino, Italy
- Died: 1634 (aged 65–66) Venosa, Italy

Andrea Pierbenedetti (1568–1634) was a Roman Catholic prelate who served as Bishop of Venosa (1611–1634).

== Biography ==
Andrea Pierbenedetti was born in Camerino, Italy in 1568. On 14 March 1611, he was appointed during the papacy of Pope Paul V as Bishop of Venosa. On 20 March 1611, he was consecrated bishop by Giovanni Garzia Mellini, Cardinal-Priest of Santi Quattro Coronati, with Antonio Seneca, Bishop of Anagni, and Pietro Bastoni, Bishop of Umbriatico, serving as co-consecrators. He served as Bishop of Venosa until his death in 1634.

== External links and additional sources ==
- Cheney, David M. "Diocese of Venosa". Catholic-Hierarchy.org. (for Chronology of Bishops) ^{[self-published]}
- Chow, Gabriel. "Diocese of Venosa". GCatholic.org. (for Chronology of Bishops) ^{[self-published]}

Catholic Church titles
Preceded by Mario Moro (bishop)	Bishop of Venosa; 1611–1634	Succeeded by Bartolomeo Frigerio
