= Diofebo Farnese =

Roman Catholic prelate

Most Reverend Diofebo Farnese
- Titular Patriarch of Jerusalem
- Church: Catholic Church
- In office: 1621–1622
- Predecessor: Francesco Cennini de' Salamandri
- Successor: Alfonso Manzanedo de Quiñones

Orders
- Consecration: 18 April 1621 by Luigi Capponi

Personal details
- Died: 1622

Diofebo Farnese (died 1622) was a Roman Catholic prelate who served as Titular Patriarch of Jerusalem (1621–1622).

== Biography ==
On 17 March 1621, Diofebo Farnese was appointed during the papacy of Pope Gregory XV as Titular Patriarch of Jerusalem. On 18 April 1621, he was consecrated bishop by Luigi Capponi, Archbishop of Ravenna, with Galeazzo Sanvitale, Archbishop Emeritus of Bari-Canosa, and Alessandro Scappi, Bishop of Satriano e Campagna, serving as co-consecrators. He served as Titular Patriarch of Jerusalem until his death in 1622.

== Episcopal succession ==
While bishop, he was the principal co-consecrator of:

- Cosimo de Torres, Titular Archbishop of Hadrianopolis in Haemimonto (1621); and
- Giovanni Mascardi, Bishop of Nebbio (1621); and
- Odoardo Farnese, Cardinal-Bishop of Sabina (1621).

== External links and additional sources ==
- Cheney, David M. "Patriarchate of Jerusalem {Gerusalemme}". Catholic-Hierarchy.org. (for Chronology of Bishops) ^{[self-published]}
- Chow, Gabriel. "Patriarchal See of Jerusalem (Israel)". GCatholic.org. (for Chronology of Bishops) ^{[self-published]}

Catholic Church titles
Preceded by Francesco Cennini de' Salamandri	Titular Patriarch of Jerusalem; 1621–1622	Succeeded by Alfonso Manzanedo de Quiñones
