= Luca Torreggiani =

17th-century Roman Catholic bishop

Most Reverend Luca Torreggiani
- Archbishop of Ravenna
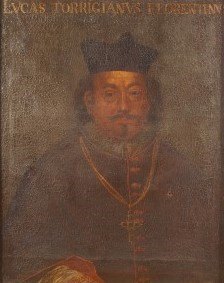
- Church: Catholic Church
- In office: 1645–1669
- Predecessor: Luigi Capponi
- Successor: Paluzzo Paluzzi Altieri Degli Albertoni

Orders
- Consecration: 15 Oct 1645 by Luigi Capponi

Personal details
- Died: 2 December 1669

Luca Torreggiani or Luca Torrigiani (died 1669) was a Roman Catholic prelate who served as Archbishop of Ravenna (1645–1669).

== Biography ==
On 18 September 1645 Luca Torreggiani was appointed, during the papacy of Pope Innocent X, as Archbishop of Ravenna. On 15 October 1645, he was consecrated as a bishop by Luigi Capponi, Cardinal-Priest of San Lorenzo in Lucina, with Alfonso Gonzaga, Titular Archbishop of Rhodus, and Girolamo Farnese, Titular Archbishop of Patrae, serving as co-consecrators. He served as Archbishop of Ravenna until his death on 2 December 1669.

== Episcopal succession ==
While bishop, he was the principal consecrator of:

- Giovanni Stefano Donghi, Bishop of Ajaccio (1652);

and the principal co-consecrator of:

- Caesar Reghini, Bishop of Sarsina (1646);
- Giulio Cesare Borea, Bishop of Comacchio (1649);
- Ludovico Ridolfi, Bishop of Patti (1649);
- Stefano Quaranta, Archbishop of Amalfi (1649);
- Girolamo Corio, Bishop of Parma (1650);
- Francesco Nerli (seniore), Bishop of Pistoia (1650);
- Pietro Rota, Bishop of Lucca (1650);
- Leonardo Severoli, Bishop of San Severo (1650);
- Domenico Blanditi, Bishop of Umbriatico (1650);
- Tommaso Lolli, Titular Bishop of Cyrene (1650);
- Giovanni Gerini, Bishop of Volterra (1650); and
- Francesco Rinuccini, Bishop of Pistoia e Prato (1656).

== External links and additional sources ==
- Cheney, David M. "Archdiocese of Ravenna-Cervia". Catholic-Hierarchy.org. (for Chronology of Bishops) ^{[self-published]}
- Chow, Gabriel. "Metropolitan Archdiocese of Ravenna–Cervia (Italy)". GCatholic.org. (for Chronology of Bishops) ^{[self-published]}

Catholic Church titles
Preceded by Luigi Capponi	Archbishop of Ravenna; 1645–1669	Succeeded by Paluzzo Paluzzi Altieri Degli Albertoni
