= Muzio Vitali =

Most Reverend Muzio Vitali
- Bishop of Vieste
- Church: Catholic Church
- Diocese: Diocese of Vieste
- In office: 1613–1615
- Predecessor: Maschio Ferracuti
- Successor: Paolo Palombo

Orders
- Consecration: 17 November 1613 by Giovanni Garzia Mellini

Personal details
- Died: 1615 Vieste, Italy

Muzio Vitali (died 1615) was a Roman Catholic prelate who served as Bishop of Vieste (1613–1615).

On 13 November 1613, Muzio Vitali was appointed during the papacy of Paul V as Bishop of Vieste. On 17 November 1613, he was consecrated bishop by Giovanni Garzia Mellini, Cardinal-Priest of Santi Quattro Coronati with Giovanni Battista del Tufo, Bishop Emeritus of Acerra, and Antonio Seneca, Bishop of Anagni, serving as co-consecrators. He served as Bishop of Vieste until his death in 1615.

== External links and additional sources ==
- Cheney, David M. "Diocese of Vieste". Catholic-Hierarchy.org. (for Chronology of Bishops) ^{[self-published]}
- Chow, Gabriel. "Diocese of Vieste (Italy)". GCatholic.org. (for Chronology of Bishops) ^{[self-published]}

Catholic Church titles
Preceded by Maschio Ferracuti	Bishop of Vieste; 1613–1615	Succeeded by Paolo Palombo
