= Giuliano Castagnola =

Catholic bishop

Most Reverend Giuliano Castagnola
- Bishop of Nebbio
- Church: Catholic Church
- Diocese: Diocese of Nebbio
- In office: 1612–1620
- Predecessor: Jacques Rusconi
- Successor: Giovanni Mascardi

Orders
- Consecration: 30 November 1612 by Giovanni Garzia Mellini

Personal details
- Born: 1572 La Spezia, Republic of Genoa
- Died: 21 December 1620 (age 48) Nebbio, Republic of Genoa

Giuliano Castagnola (1572 – 21 December 1620) was a Catholic prelate who served as Bishop of Nebbio (1612–1620).

== Biography ==
Giuliano Castagnola was born in La Spezia, Italy in 1572. He was Doctor in utroque iure (Civil and Canon Law), and was Rector of the Parish of San Lorenzo in montibus in Rome. On 19 November 1612, he was appointed during the papacy of Pope Paul V as Bishop of Nebbio. On 30 November 1612, he was consecrated bishop by Giovanni Garzia Mellini, Cardinal-Priest of Santi Quattro Coronati with Giovanni Battista Salvago, Bishop of Luni e Sarzana, and Antonio Seneca, Bishop of Anagni, serving as co-consecrators. He served as Bishop of Nebbio until his death on 21 December 1620.

Catholic Church titles
Preceded by Jacques Rusconi	Bishop of Nebbio; 1612–1620	Succeeded by Giovanni Mascardi
