= Sammarco =

Sammarco is a surname. Notable people with the surname include:

- Gian Sammarco (born 1970), English former child actor and nurse
- Mario Sammarco, Italian operatic baritone
- Paolo Sammarco (born 1983), Italian soccer player
- Paolo Emilio Sammarco (died 1610), Italian Roman Catholic bishop
