= Marzio Ginetti =

Catholic cardinal

His Eminence Marzio Ginetti
- Cardinal-Bishop of Porto–Santa Rufina
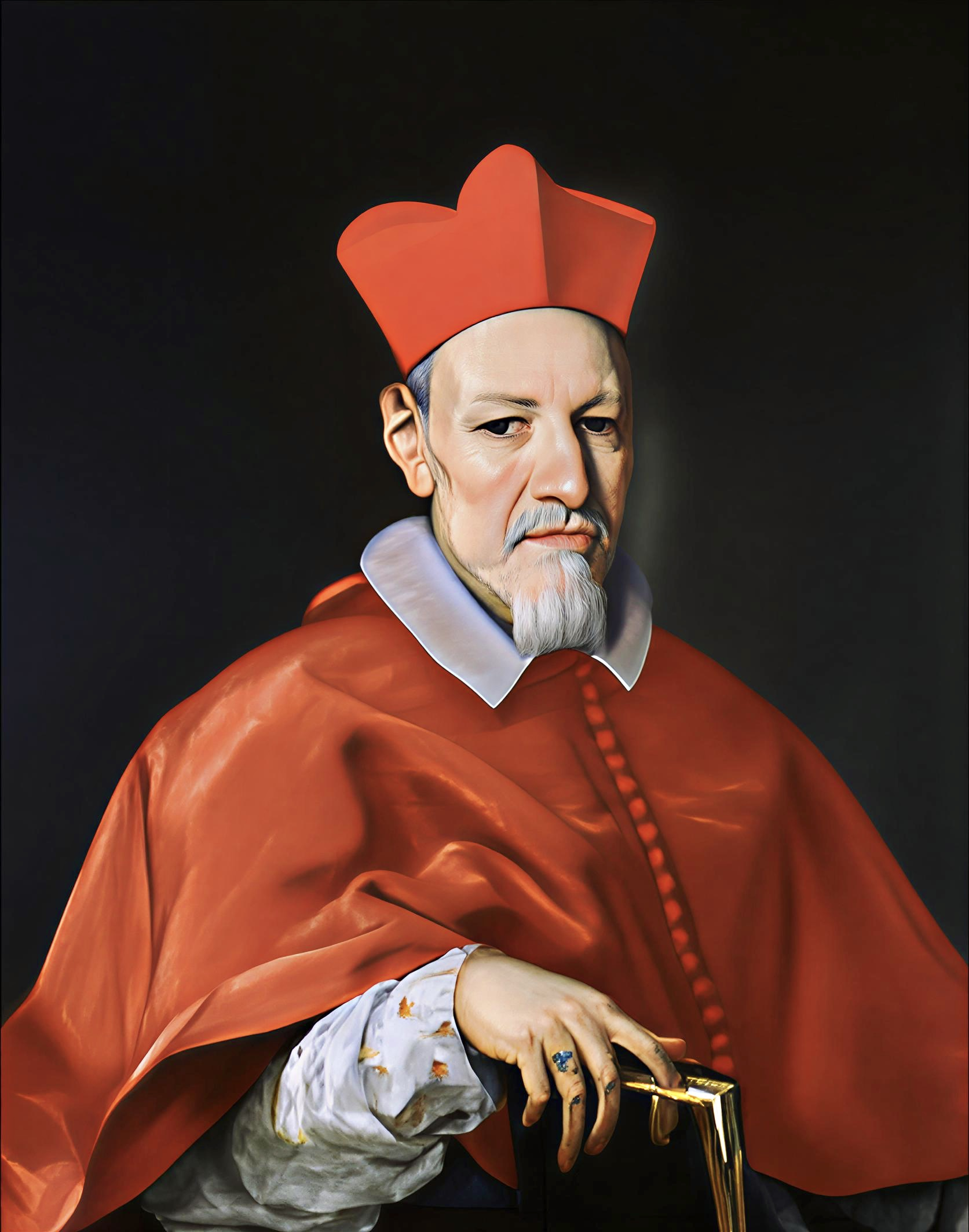
- Portrait by Giovanni Battista Gaulli, 17th century
- Church: Catholic Church
- Appointed: 1666
- Term ended: 1671
- Predecessor: Francesco Barberini
- Successor: Francesco Maria Brancaccio
- Other posts: Cardinal Vicar (1629-1671)
- Previous posts: Cardinal-Priest of Santa Maria sopra Minerva (1646–1652); Cardinal-Bishop of Albano (1653–1663); Cardinal-Bishop of Sabina (1663–1666)

Orders
- Created cardinal: 19 January 1626 by Pope Urban VIII
- Rank: Cardinal-Bishop

Personal details
- Born: 6 April 1585 Velletri, Italy
- Died: 1 March 1671 (aged 85) Rome, Papal States
- Buried: Sant'Andrea della Valle
- Coat of arms

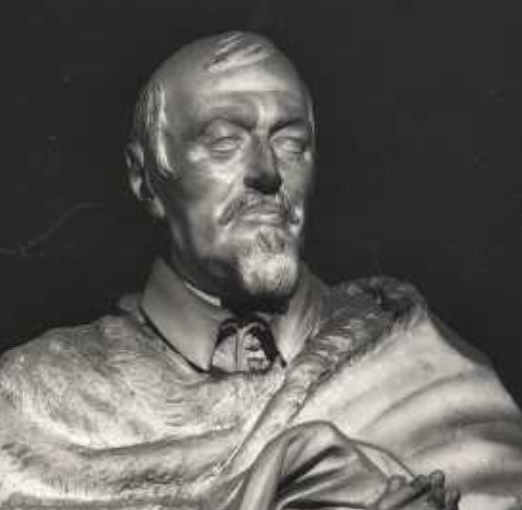
Sepulchral statue of Cardinal Marzio Ginetti by Antonio Raggi; Rome, Sant'Andrea della Valle

Marzio Ginetti (6 April 1585 – 1 March 1671) was an Italian Catholic Cardinal and Cardinal Vicar of Rome.

== Early life ==
Ginetti was born in Velletri, the son of a labourer. He was sent to Rome at a very young age to be educated and tried to make himself known to a number of cardinals. Eventually he was appointed chamberlain to Pope Paul V. Upon that Pope's death, Maffeo Barberini was elected as Pope Urban VIII and Ginetti became acquainted with Cardinal Francesco Barberini, the new Pope's nephew. Barberini urged his uncle to promote Ginetti and he was made a Referendary of the Tribunals of the Apostolic Signatura. Thereafter he remained a loyal supporter of the Barberini.

== Cardinalate ==
On 19 January 1626, he was elevated to cardinal by Pope Urban VIII and installed as Cardinal-Priest at Santa Francesca Romana in 1627. In 1629, he was made Cardinal Vicar (a title he held until his death) and was made Cardinal-Priest at Sant'Angelo in Pescheria in 1634.

In 1635, Ginetti was appointed Papal Legate to Austria in an attempt, by the Barberini, to put him forward as an elder statesman. But he did not conduct himself particularly well and the effort was seen as counter-productive. Ginetti returned to Rome where in 1639, he and Cardinal Bernardino Spada gave assistance and protection to a visiting Carlo Cesare Malvasia.

Unimpressed by Ginetti's efforts in Austria, Pope Urban VIII sent him to Ferrara as legate in 1640, where he amassed considerable wealth and remained until 1643.

== Papal conclaves ==
In 1644, he was appointed Cardinal-Priest at Sant'Eustachio and participated in the papal conclave of that year, which elected Pope Innocent X. Contemporary, John Bargrave, suggested Ginetti considered himself papable; suitable for election to the papacy. But the Barberini would not entertain it and any efforts on Ginetti's part to suggest as much came to naught.

He later participated in the conclave of 1655. He was appointed Vice-Dean of the College of Cardinals and held the position during the conclaves of 1667 and 1669–1670.

He died 1671 and was buried at the Sant'Andrea della Valle. He was the uncle of (also later cardinal) Giovanni Francesco Ginetti.

Catholic Church titles
Preceded by Giovanni Garzia Mellini	Cardinal Vicar; 1629–1671	Succeeded by Paluzzo Paluzzi Altieri degli Albertoni
Preceded by Alessandro Cesarini	Cardinal-Deacon of Sant'Eustachio; 1644	Succeeded by Carlo de' Medici
Preceded by Bernardino Spada	Cardinal-Priest of San Pietro in Vincoli; 1646–1652	Succeeded by Giovanni Battista Maria Pallotta
Preceded by Federico Baldissera Bartolomeo Cornaro	Cardinal-Bishop of Albano; 1653–1663	Succeeded by Giovanni Battista Maria Pallotta
Preceded by Giulio Cesare Sacchetti	Cardinal Bishop of Sabina; 1663–1666	Succeeded by Francesco Maria Brancaccio
Preceded by Francesco Barberini	Cardinal-Bishop of Porto-Santa Rufina; 1666–1671	Succeeded by Francesco Maria Brancaccio
Records
Preceded by Vincenzo Maculani	Oldest living Member of the Sacred College; 6 April 1670 - 1 MArch 1671	Succeeded by Francesco Albizzi
