= Leonardo Severoli =

17th-century Roman Catholic bishop

Most Reverend Leonardo Severoli
- Bishop of San Severo
- Church: Catholic Church
- Diocese: Diocese of San Severo
- In office: 1650–1652
- Predecessor: Francesco Antonio Sacchetti
- Successor: Giovanni Battista Monti (bishop)

Orders
- Consecration: 3 Jul 1650 by Marcantonio Franciotti

Personal details
- Born: 1605 Faenza, Italy
- Died: 1652 (aged 46–47)

Leonardo Severoli (1605–1652) was a Roman Catholic prelate who served as Bishop of San Severo (1650–1652).

== Biography ==
Leonardo Severoli was born in 1605 in Faenza, Italy. On 27 Jun 1650, he was appointed during the papacy of Pope Innocent X as Bishop of San Severo. On 3 Jul 1650, he was consecrated bishop Marcantonio Franciotti, Cardinal-Priest of Santa Maria della Pace, with Luca Torreggiani, Archbishop of Ravenna, and Ranuccio Scotti Douglas, Bishop Emeritus of Borgo San Donnino, serving as co-consecrators. He served as Bishop of San Severo until his death in 1652.

== External links and additional sources ==
- Cheney, David M. "Diocese of San Severo". Catholic-Hierarchy.org. (for Chronology of Bishops) ^{[self-published]}
- Chow, Gabriel. "Diocese of San Severo (Italy)". GCatholic.org. (for Chronology of Bishops) ^{[self-published]}

Catholic Church titles
| Preceded by Francesco Antonio Sacchetti | Bishop of San Severo; 1650–1652 | Succeeded by Giovanni Battista Monti (bishop) |
