= Giovanni Garzia Mellini =

Italian Roman Catholic prelate

His Eminence Giovanni Garzia Mellini
- Cardinal-Bishop of Frascati
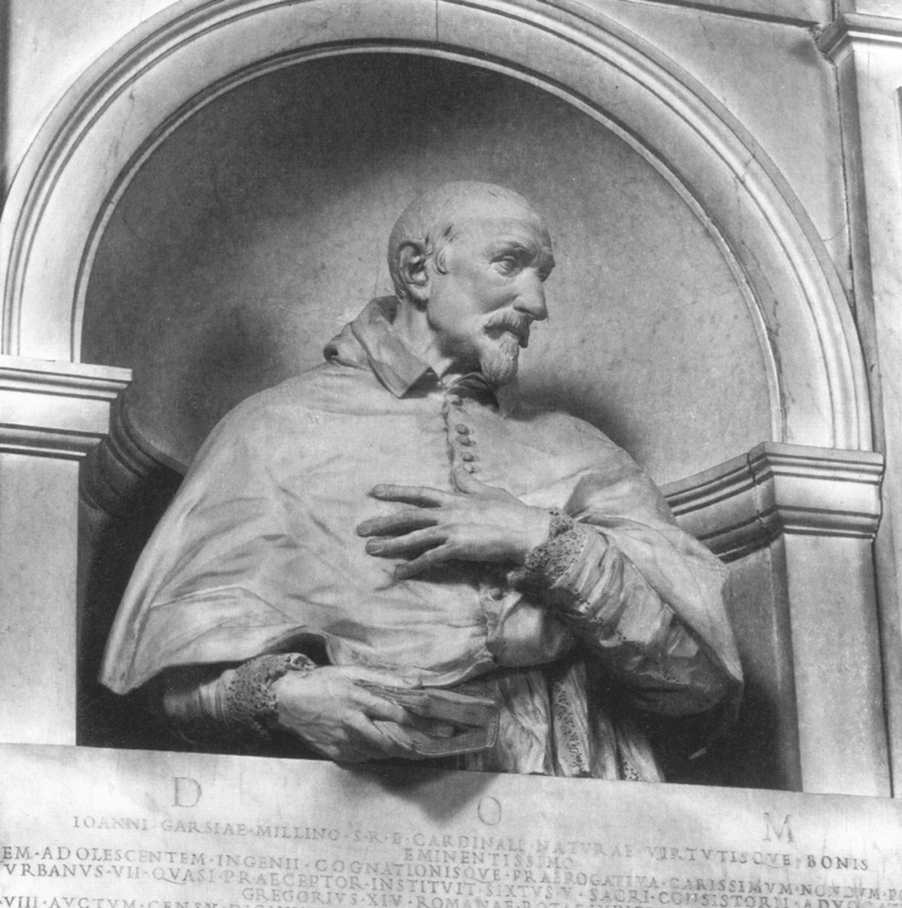
- Church: Catholic Church
- In office: 1629
- Predecessor: Andrea Baroni Peretti Montalto
- Successor: Marcello Lante della Rovere

Orders
- Ordination: 1566 by Pope Pius V
- Consecration: 12 June 1605 by Ludovico de Torres (cardinal)
- Created cardinal: September 11, 1606
- Rank: Cardinal-Bishop

Personal details
- Born: 1562 Florence, Italy
- Died: October 2, 1629 (aged 66–67) Rome, Italy

Giovanni Garzia Mellini (his first name is also rendered Giangarzia while his middle name is also rendered Garsia) (1562 – 2 October 1629) was a Roman Catholic prelate who served as Cardinal-Bishop of Frascati (1629), Cardinal-Priest of San Lorenzo in Lucina (1627–1629), Camerlengo of the Sacred College of Cardinals (1623–1625), Archpriest of the Basilica di Santa Maria Maggiore (1622–1629), Cardinal-Priest of Santi Quattro Coronati (1608–1627), Archbishop (Personal Title) of Imola (1607–1611), and Apostolic Nuncio to Spain (1605–1607).

== Biography ==
Giovanni Garzia Mellini was born to a noble Roman family in Florence, Italy in 1562, the son of Mario Millini and Ortensia Jacovacci. He comes from a family of cardinals who served both before and after him: Giovanni Battista Mellini (installed 1476); his uncle, Giambattista Castagna (later Pope Urban VII) (installed 1583); Savo Millini (installed 1681); and Mario Millini (installed 1747). He studied law under his uncle, Giambattista Castagna.

From 1585 to 1590, he served as consistorial lawyer for Pope Sixtus V. In 1591, he was appointed as Auditor of the Sacred Roman Rota. During the papacy of Pope Clement VIII, he went to France with Cardinal Pietro Aldobrandini to negotiate the marriage of Marie de' Medici to King Henri IV. On June 1, 1605, he was named Titular Archbishop of Colossae by Pope Leo XI and consecrated bishop on 12 June 1605 by Ludovico de Torres (cardinal), Archbishop of Monreale, with Valeriano Muti, Bishop of Città di Castello, and Gaspare Paluzzi degli Albertoni, Bishop of Sant'Angelo dei Lombardi e Bisaccia, serving as co-consecrators. On June 20, 1605, he was appointed as Apostolic Nuncio to Spain where he served until May 22, 1607. On September 11, 1606, he was elevated to cardinal by Pope Paul V and appointed Bishop of Imola on 7 February 1607. On 7 January 1608, he received the title of Cardinal-Priest of Santi Quattro Coronati. On 27 June 1611, he resigned as Bishop of Imola. He served as Vicar general of Rome (1610-1629) and Secretary of the Supreme Sacred Congregation of the Roman and Universal Inquisition (1616-1629).

While cardinal, he participated in the conclave of 1621 which elected Pope Gregory XV; and the conclave of 1623 which elected Pope Urban VIII. In 1622, he was appointed the Archpriest of the Basilica di Santa Maria Maggiore. On August 6, 1623, he was elected as Camerlengo of the Sacred College of Cardinals and reelected on January 15, 1624; he served until January 13, 1625. On 14 April 1627, he received the title of Cardinal-Priest of San Lorenzo in Lucina and Archpriest of the patriarchal Liberian basilica. On 20 August 1629, he was named Cardinal-Bishop of Frascati, a title he held until his death on October 2, 1629, in Rome. He is buried in the church of Santa Maria del Popolo.

== Episcopal succession ==
Episcopal succession of Giovanni Garzia Mellini

While bishop, he was the principal consecrator of:

- Giovanni Giacomo Macedonio, Bishop of Monopoli (1608);
- Paolo Emilio Sammarco, Bishop of Umbriatico (1609);
- Giambattista Visconti, Bishop of Teramo (1609);
- Lodovico Magio, Bishop of Lucera (1609);
- Antonio Albergati, Bishop of Bisceglie (1609);
- Vincenzo Napoli, Bishop of Patti (1609);
- Pietro Bastoni, Bishop of Umbriatico (1611);
- Andrea Pierbenedetti, Bishop of Venosa (1611);
- Rodolfo Paleotti, Bishop of Imola (1611);
- Francesco Piccolomini (bishop), Bishop of Grosseto (1611);
- Cosimo Dossena, Bishop of Tortona (1612);
- Lorenzo Landi, Bishop of Fossombrone (1612);
- Guillaume d'Hugues, Archbishop of Embrun (1612);
- Ludovico Sarego, Bishop of Adria (1612);
- Ottavio Ridolfi, Bishop of Ariano (1612);
- Francesco Cennini de' Salamandri, Bishop of Amelia (1612);
- Ennio Filonardi (bishop), Bishop of Ferentino (1612);
- Giuliano Castagnola, Bishop of Nebbio (1612);
- Fulvio Tesorieri, Bishop of Belcastro (1612);
- Selvaggio Primitelli, Bishop of Lavello (1613);
- Giovanni Battista de Aquena, Bishop of Bosa (1613);
- Muzio Vitali, Bishop of Vieste (1613);
- Curzio Cocci, Archbishop of Conza (1614);
- Ottaviano Garzadoro, Bishop of Ossero (1614);
- Francesco Diotallevi, Bishop of Sant'Angelo dei Lombardi e Bisaccia (1614);
- Andrea Giustiniani, Bishop of Isola (1614);
- Scipione Pasquali, Bishop of Casale Monferrato (1615);
- Girolamo Pignatelli, Archbishop of Rossano (1615);
- Vincenzo Periti, Bishop of Lavello (1615);
- Giovanni Antonio Galderisi, Bishop of Bovino (1616);
- Achille Caracciolo, Bishop of Potenza (1616);
- Michelangelo Seghizzi, Bishop of Lodi (1616);
- Girolamo Ricciulli, Bishop of Belcastro (1616);
- Lelio Veterano, Bishop of Fondi (1616);
- Vincenzo Agnello Suardi, Bishop of Alba Pompeia (1616);
- Innico Siscara, Bishop of Anglona-Tursi (1616);
- Petrus Katich (Catich), Bishop of Prizren (1618);
- García Gil Manrique, Auxiliary Bishop of Cuenca (1618);
- Andrea Mastrillo, Archbishop of Messina (1618);
- Francisco Romero (bishop), Archbishop of Lanciano (1618);
- Zaccaria della Vecchia, Bishop of Torcello (1618);
- Giulio Monterenzi, Bishop of Faenza (1618);
- Rafael Ripoz, Bishop of Perpignan-Elne (1618);
- Francesco Maria Abbiati, Bishop of Bobbio (1618);
- Jerónimo Venero Leyva, Archbishop of Monreale (1620);
- Giovanni Battista de Asti, Titular Bishop of Thagaste (1620);
- Paolo Arese, Bishop of Tortona (1620);
- Germanicus Mantica, Titular Bishop of Famagusta (1620);
- Tommaso Ximenes, Bishop of Fiesole (1620);
- Francesco Trivulzio, Bishop of Nocera de' Pagani (1621);
- Silvestro Andreozzi, Bishop of Penne e Atri (1621);
- Cristoforo Memmolo, Bishop of Ruvo (1621);
- Bernardo Florio, Bishop of Canea (1621);
- Paulus Pucciarelli, Bishop of Andros (1621);
- Marco Antonio Quirino, Archbishop of Naxos (1622);
- Benedetto Baaz (Vaez), Bishop of Umbriatico (1622);
- Álvaro de Mendoza (bishop), Bishop of L'Aquila (1622);
- Diego Merino, Bishop of Montepeloso (1623);
- Giovanni Lopez de Andrade, Archbishop of Otranto (1623);
- Giulio Antonio Santoro, Archbishop of Cosenza (1624);
- Diego Cabeza de Vaca, Bishop of Crotone (1624);
- Onorio de Verme, Bishop of Ravello e Scala (1624);
- Elias Marini (Marinich), Bishop of Sardica (1624);

and the principal co-consecrator of:

- Scipione Caffarelli-Borghese, Archbishop of Bologna (1610);
- Felice Centini, Bishop of Mileto (1611);
- Gregorio Petrocchini, Cardinal-Bishop of Palestrina (1611);
- Benedetto Giustiniani, Bishop of Palestrina (1612); and
- Agostino Galamini, Bishop of Recanati e Loreto (1613).

While bishop, he ordained Giovanni Battista Altieri as priest (1613); and ordained Francesco Diotallevi as both deacon (1614) and priest (1614).

Catholic Church titles
Preceded by Giuseppe Ferrerio	Titular Archbishop of Colossae; 1605–1607	Succeeded by Guido Bentivoglio d'Aragona
Preceded by Domenico Ginnasi	Apostolic Nuncio to Spain; 1605–1607	Succeeded by Decio Carafa
Preceded by Alessandro Musotti	Archbishop (Personal Title) of Imola; 1607–1611	Succeeded by Rodolfo Paleotti
Preceded by Giovanni Antonio Facchinetti de Nuce	Cardinal-Priest of Santi Quattro Coronati; 1608–1627	Succeeded by Girolamo Vidoni
Preceded by Michelangelo Tonti	Archpriest of the Basilica di Santa Maria Maggiore; 1622–1629	Succeeded by Giacomo Rospigliosi
Preceded by Maffeo Barberini	Camerlengo of the Sacred College of Cardinals; 1623–1625	Succeeded by Marcello Lante della Rovere
Preceded by Carlo Emmanuele Pio di Savoia	Cardinal-Priest of San Lorenzo in Lucina; 1627–1629	Succeeded by Luigi Capponi
Preceded by Andrea Baroni Peretti Montalto	Cardinal-Bishop of Frascati; 1629	Succeeded by Marcello Lante della Rovere
