= Gaspare Paluzzi degli Albertoni =

Roman Catholic prelate

Most Reverend Gaspare Paluzzi degli Albertoni
- Bishop of Sant'Angelo dei Lombardi e Bisaccia; Apostolic Collector to Portugal
- Church: Catholic Church
- In office: 1601–1614
- Predecessor: Flaminio Torcella
- Successor: Francesco Diotallevi

Personal details
- Born: 1566 Rome, Italy
- Died: 1614 (age 48)

Gaspare Paluzzi degli Albertoni (1566–1614) was a Roman Catholic prelate who served as Bishop of Sant'Angelo dei Lombardi e Bisaccia (1601–1614) and Apostolic Collector to Portugal (1609–1614).

== Biography ==
Gaspare Paluzzi degli Albertoni was born in Rome in 1566. On 4 April 1601, he was appointed during the papacy of Pope Clement VIII as Bishop of Sant'Angelo dei Lombardi e Bisaccia. On 31 January 1609, he was appointed during the papacy of Pope Paul V as Apostolic Collector to Portugal. He served as Bishop of Sant'Angelo dei Lombardi e Bisaccia until his death in 1614.

== Episcopal succession ==
While bishop, he was the principal consecrator of:

- Rui Pires da Veiga, Bishop of Elvas (1613);

and the principal co-consecrator of:

- Giovanni Garzia Mellini, Titular Archbishop of Colossae (1605); and
- Paolo Emilio Sammarco, Bishop of Umbriatico (1609).

== External links and additional sources ==
- Cheney, David M. "Diocese of Sant'Angelo dei Lombardi e Bisaccia". Catholic-Hierarchy.org. (for Chronology of Bishops) ^{[self-published]}
- Chow, Gabriel. "Archdiocese of Sant'Angelo dei Lombardi–Conza–Nusco–Bisaccia". GCatholic.org. (for Chronology of Bishops) ^{[self-published]}

Catholic Church titles
Preceded by Flaminio Torcella	Bishop of Sant'Angelo dei Lombardi e Bisaccia; 1609–1614	Succeeded by Francesco Diotallevi
Preceded by Fabrizio Caracciolo Piscizi	Apostolic Collector to Portugal; 1609–1614	Succeeded by Ottavio Accoramboni
