= Tomassoni =

Tomassoni is an Italian surname. Notable people with the surname include:

- David Tomassoni (1952–2022), American politician
- Mirko Tomassoni (born 1969), Captain Regent of San Marino
- Ronn Tomassoni (born 1958), American ice hockey player and coach
- Thomas Tomassoni (1616–1654), Italian Roman Catholic bishop

== See also ==
- Tomassoni awards, an Italian physics award
