= Antonio d'Aquino =

Italian Roman Catholic prelate (1578)

Most Reverend Antonio d'Aquino
- Archbishop of Taranto
- Church: Catholic Church
- Archdiocese: Archdiocese of Taranto
- In office: 1618-1627
- Predecessor: Bonifazio Caetani
- Successor: Francisco Sánchez Villanueva y Vega
- Previous post: Bishop of Sarno (1595-1618)

Orders
- Consecration: 2 May 1595 by Alessandro Ottaviano de' Medici

Personal details
- Born: 1565 Rome, Italy
- Died: 27 August 1627 (age 62) Taranto, Italy

Antonio d'Aquino (died 27 August 1627) was a Roman Catholic prelate who served as Archbishop of Taranto (1618-1627) and Bishop of Sarno (1595-1618).

== Biography ==
Antonio d'Aquino was born in Rome, Italy in 1565. On 19 February 1573, he was appointed during the papacy of Pope Gregory XIII as Bishop of Sarno. On 2 May 1595, he was consecrated bishop by Alessandro Ottaviano de' Medici, Archbishop of Florence, with Ludovico de Torres, Archbishop of Monreale, and Leonard Abel, Titular Bishop of Sidon, serving as co-consecrators. On 23 July 1618, he was appointed during the papacy of Pope Gregory XIII as Archbishop of Taranto. He served as Archbishop of Taranto until his death on 27 August 1627.

== Episcopal succession ==
While bishop, he was the principal co-consecrator of:

- Paolo Emilio Sammarco, Bishop of Umbriatico (1609);
- Giambattista Visconti, Bishop of Teramo (1609);
- Antonio Albergati, Bishop of Bisceglie (1609);
- Pietro Bastoni, Bishop of Umbriatico (1611);
- Giulio Masi, Bishop of Giovinazzo (1611);
- Giulio Mattei, Bishop of Bitetto (1611);
- János Telegdy, Bishop of Bosnia (1611);
- Mario Sassi, Archbishop of Rossano (1612);
- Selvaggio Primitelli, Bishop of Lavello (1613);
- Paolo Pico, Bishop of Vulturara e Montecorvino (1613);
- Juan Torres de Osorio, Bishop of Siracusa (1613);
- Juan Serrano Ortiz, Bishop of Acerno (1613);
- Clemente Gera, Bishop of Terni (1613);
- Marcello Pignatelli, Bishop of Jesi (1617); and
- Girolamo de Franchis, Bishop of Nardò (1617).

== External links and additional sources ==
- Cheney, David M. "Diocese of Sarno". Catholic-Hierarchy.org. (for Chronology of Bishops) ^{[self-published]}
- Chow, Gabriel. "Diocese of Sarno (Italy)". GCatholic.org. (for Chronology of Bishops) ^{[self-published]}

Catholic Church titles
Preceded by Girolamo Matteucci	Bishop of Sarno; 1595-1618	Succeeded by Stefano Solis Castelblanco
Preceded by Bonifazio Caetani	Archbishop of Taranto; 1618-1627	Succeeded by Francisco Sánchez Villanueva y Vega
