= Cosimo Dossena =

Catholic prelate (1547–1620)

Most Reverend Cosimo Dossena
- Bishop of Tortona
- Church: Catholic Church
- Diocese: Diocese of Tortona
- In office: 1612–1620
- Predecessor: Maffeo Gambara
- Successor: Paolo Arese

Orders
- Consecration: 4 March 1612 by Giovanni Garzia Mellini

Personal details
- Born: 1547 Pavia, Italy
- Died: 12 March 1620 (age 73) Tortona, Italy

Bishop Cosimo Dossena, B. (1547 – 12 March 1620) was a Catholic prelate who served as Bishop of Tortona from 1612 to 1620.

== Biography ==
Cosimo Dossena was born in Pavia in 1547 and ordained a priest in the Clerics Regular of Saint Paul. On 27 February 1612, he was appointed during the papacy of Pope Paul V as Bishop of Tortona. On 4 March 1612, he was consecrated bishop by Giovanni Garzia Mellini, Cardinal-Priest of Santi Quattro Coronati, with Giovanni Ambrogio Caccia, Bishop Emeritus of Castro del Lazio, and Antonio Seneca, Bishop of Anagni, serving as co-consecrators. He served as Bishop of Tortona until his death on 12 March 1620.

== External links and additional sources ==
- Cheney, David M. "Diocese of Tortona". Catholic-Hierarchy.org. (for Chronology of Bishops) ^{[self-published]}
- Chow, Gabriel. "Diocese of Tortona (Italy)". GCatholic.org. (for Chronology of Bishops) ^{[self-published]}

Catholic Church titles
Preceded by Maffeo Gambara	Bishop of Tortona; 1612–1620	Succeeded by Paolo Arese
