= Antonio Seneca =

Roman Catholic Prelate

Most Reverend Antonio Seneca
- Bishop of Anagni
- Church: Catholic Church
- Diocese: Diocese of Anagni
- In office: 1607–1626
- Predecessor: Vittorio Guarini
- Successor: Gian Gaspare Melis

Orders
- Consecration: 2 July 1607 by Ludovico de Torres

Personal details
- Died: 11 August 1626 Anagni, Italy

Antonio Seneca (died 11 August 1626) was a Roman Catholic prelate who served as Bishop of Anagni (1607–1626).

== Biography ==
On 25 June 1607, Antonio Seneca was appointed during the papacy of Pope Paul V as Bishop of Anagni. On 2 July 1607, he was consecrated bishop by Ludovico de Torres, Archbishop of Monreale, with Girolamo di Porzia, Bishop of Adria, and Claudio Rangoni, Bishop of Reggio Emilia, serving as co-consecrators. He served as Bishop of Anagni until his death on 11 August 1626.

== Episcopal succession ==
While bishop, he was the principal co-consecrator of:

- Caesar Fedele, Titular Bishop of Salona (1607);
- Giulio Calvo d'Albeto, Bishop of Sora (1608);
- Antonio Cesonio, Bishop of Oppido Mamertina (1609);
- Giambattista Brivio, Bishop of Cremona (1610);
- Andrea Pierbenedetti, Bishop of Venosa (1611);
- Cosimo Dossena, Bishop of Tortona (1612);
- Guillaume d'Hugues, Archbishop of Embrun (1612);
- Ennio Filonardi (bishop), Bishop of Ferentino (1612);
- Giuliano Castagnola, Bishop of Nebbio (1612); and
- Muzio Vitali, Bishop of Vieste (1613).

== External links and additional sources ==
- Cheney, David M. "Diocese of Anagni-Alatri". Catholic-Hierarchy.org. (for Chronology of Bishops)^{self-published}
- Chow, Gabriel. "Diocese of Anagni-Alatri (Italy)". GCatholic.org. (for Chronology of Bishops)^{self-published}

Catholic Church titles
Preceded by Vittorio Guarini	Bishop of Anagni; 1607–1626	Succeeded by Gian Gaspare Melis
