= Giovanni Francesco Ginetti =

Catholic cardinal (1626–1691)

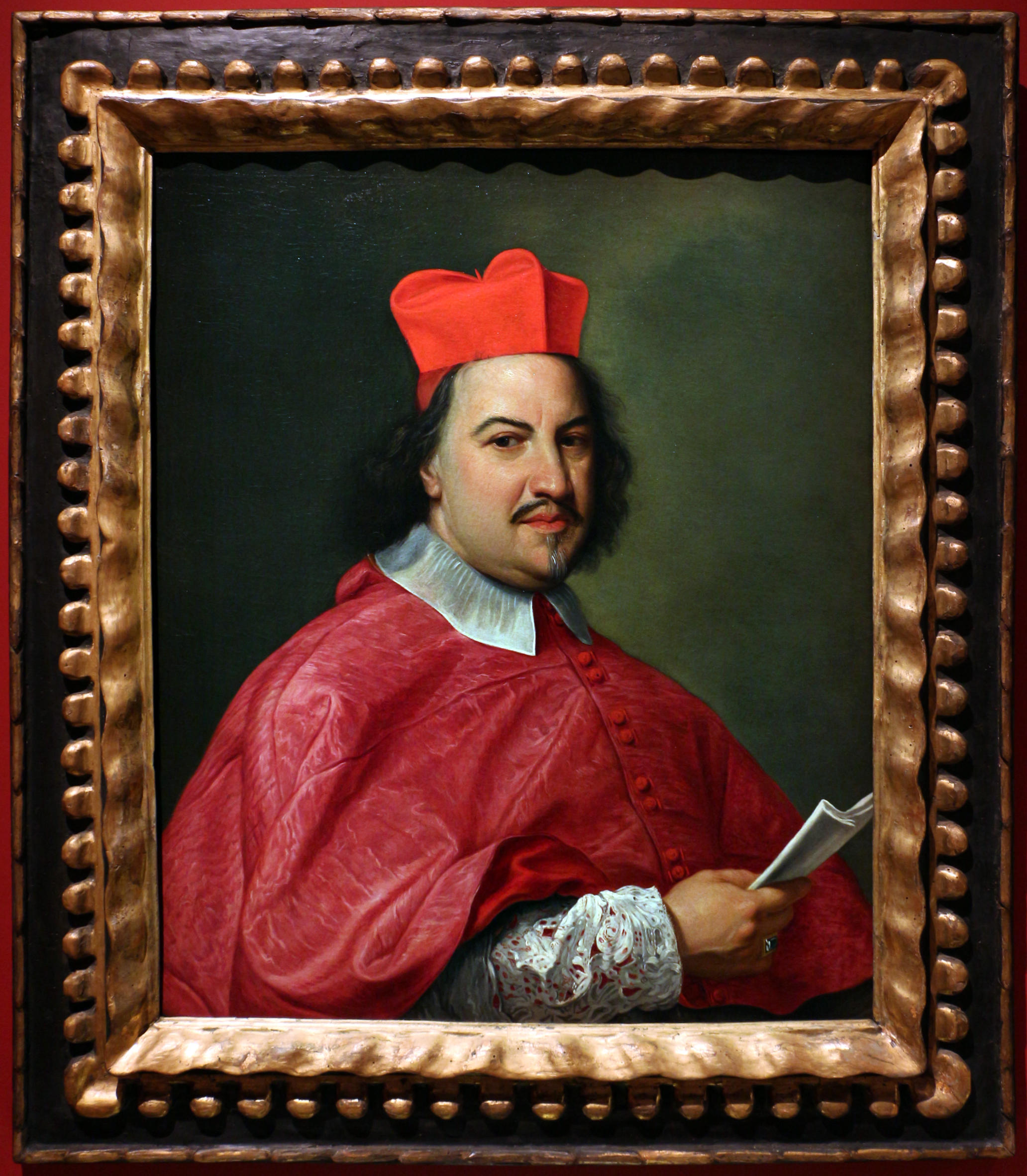
Portrait of Gianfrancesco Ginetti, by Baciccio

Giovanni Francesco Ginetti (12 December 1626 – 18 September 1691) was a nephew of Cardinal Marzio Ginetti (1585-1681).

== Biography ==
Under the reign of Pope Alexander VII he was appointed him Referendary of the Apostolic Signatura, later Sergeant Major of the Papal Army (1625-1635) and then Treasurer General of the Apostolic Chamber. He was also deputy governor of Castel Sant'Angelo.

Gianfrancesco Ginetti was created cardinal deacon in the consistory of 1 September 1681 under Pope Innocent XI; on 22 September he received the deaconry of S. Maria della Scala in Rome. On 12 January 1682 he opted for the deaconry of Sant'Angelo in Pescheria

On 5 June 1684 Cardinal Gianfrancesco Ginetti was appointed archbishop of Fermo

He participated in the Conclave of 1689, which elected Alexander VIII, and the Conclave of 1691, which elected Innocent XII.

Ginetti died of cholera in Rome on 18 September 1691 and was buried in his family chapel in the church of Sant'Andrea della Valle, opposite to his uncle.

== Sources ==
- Dizionario di erudizione storico-ecclesiastica da S. Pietro sino ai nostri, Gaetano Moroni Venezia, 1845, page 237
- Documents sur le capitain Jules Mazarin - Henry Coville, Mélanges d'archéologie et d'histoire, 1914 Vol.34, Issue 34 pp. 201–234
