= Bartolomeo Olivieri =

18th-century Italian Roman Catholic bishop

Most Reverend Bartolomeo Olivieri
- Bishop of Umbriatico
- Church: Catholic Church
- Diocese: Diocese of Umbriatico
- In office: 1696–1708
- Predecessor: Michael Cantelmi
- Successor: Antonio Gagliani

Orders
- Ordination: 30 January 1667
- Consecration: 21 December 1696 by Sebastiano Antonio Tanara

Personal details
- Born: 3 December 1642 Cutro, Kingdom of Naples
- Died: 24 August 1708 (age 65) Umbriatico, Kingdom of Naples

Bartolomeo Olivieri or Bartholomaeus Olivieri (1642–1708) was a Roman Catholic prelate who served as Bishop of Umbriatico (1696–1708).

== Biography ==
Bartolomeo Olivieri was born in Cutro, Italy on 3 December 1642 and ordained a priest on 30 January 1667. On 17 December 1696, he was appointed during the papacy of Pope Innocent XII as Bishop of Umbriatico. On 21 December 1696, he was consecrated bishop by Sebastiano Antonio Tanara, Cardinal-Priest of Santi Quattro Coronati, with Prospero Bottini, Titular Archbishop of Myra, and Giorgio Spinola, Bishop of Albenga, serving as co-consecrators. He served as Bishop of Umbriatico until his death on 24 August 1708.

== External links and additional sources ==
- Cheney, David M. "Diocese of Umbriatico (Umbriaticum)". Catholic-Hierarchy.org. (for Chronology of Bishops) ^{[self-published]}
- Chow, Gabriel. "Titular Episcopal See of Umbriatico (Italy)". GCatholic.org. (for Chronology of Bishops) ^{[self-published]}

Catholic Church titles
Preceded by Michael Cantelmi	Bishop of Umbriatico; 1696–1708	Succeeded by Antonio Gagliani
