= François de La Boullaye-Le Gouz =

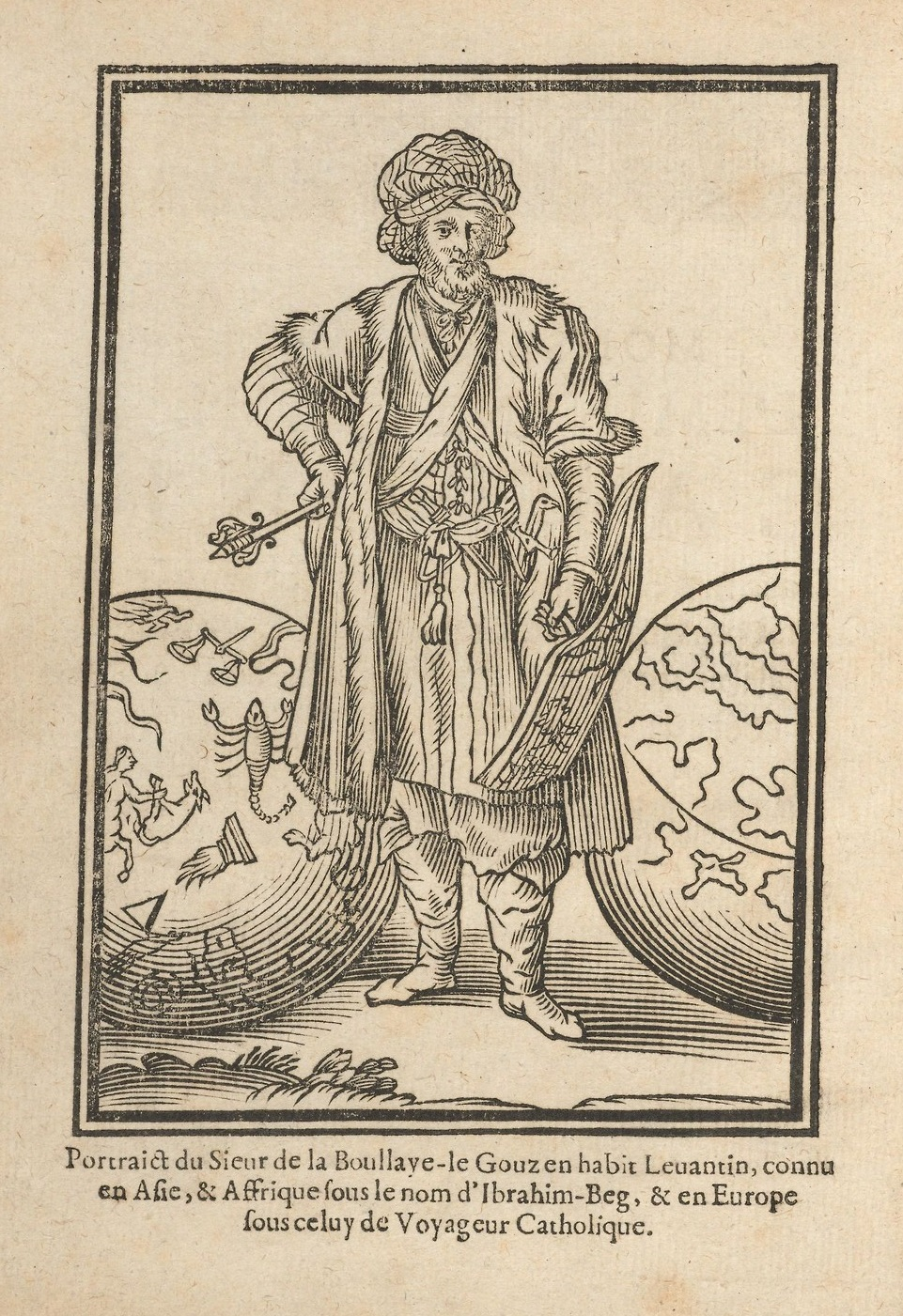
La Boullaye-Le Gouz in Middle Eastern dress. From his travel book Les Voyages et Observations, 1657 edition.

François de La Boullaye-Le Gouz (1623 – 1668/1669?), was a French aristocrat and extensive traveller.

He published a French-language travelogue, enriched with firsthand accounts of India, Persia, Greece, the Middle East, Denmark, Germany, Netherlands, England, Ireland, and Italy. It is considered one of the first true travel books, in that it contains useful information for actual travellers.

In 1647, he visited Viterbo and met with Italian nobleman, Federico Capponi. When he returned to Italy in 1650, Federico had died so La Boullaye met with his relative, Cardinal Luigi Capponi and dedicated the first printed edition of his work to the Cardinal. The preface includes an illustration of the adventurer presented the work to Capponi.

He died in Ispahan, Iran.

== Works ==
- Les voyages et observations du sieur de La Boullaye Le gouz, Gervais Closier, Paris 1653 & 1657.
