= Emiliano Bombini =

16th-century Roman Catholic bishop

Most Reverend Emiliano Bombini
- Bishop of Umbriatico
- Church: Catholic Church
- Diocese: Diocese of Umbriatico
- In office: 1579–1592
- Predecessor: Vincenzo Ferrari
- Successor: Alessandro Filarete

Personal details
- Born: 1543
- Died: 1592 (age 49)

Emiliano Bombini (1543–1592) was a Roman Catholic prelate who served as Bishop of Umbriatico (1579–1592).

== Biography ==
Emiliano Bombini was born in 1543. On 16 Mar 1579, he was appointed during the papacy of Pope Gregory XIII as Bishop of Umbriatico. He served as Bishop of Umbriatico until his death in 1592.

== External links and additional sources ==
- Cheney, David M. "Diocese of Umbriatico (Umbriaticum)". Catholic-Hierarchy.org. (for Chronology of Bishops) ^{[self-published]}
- Chow, Gabriel. "Titular Episcopal See of Umbriatico (Italy)". GCatholic.org. (for Chronology of Bishops) ^{[self-published]}

Catholic Church titles
Preceded by Vincenzo Ferrari	Bishop of Umbriatico; 1579–1592	Succeeded by Alessandro Filarete
