= Vincenzo Saporiti =

Catholic bishop

Most Reverend Vincenzo Saporiti
- Bishop of Nebbio
- Church: Catholic Church
- Diocese: Diocese of Nebbio
- In office: 1646–1664
- Predecessor: Giovanni Mascardi
- Successor: Francesco Camillo de Mari

Orders
- Consecration: 21 December 1646 by Giulio Cesare Sacchetti

Personal details
- Born: 1606 Monte Rosso, Italy
- Died: 2 January 1664 (aged 57–58) Nebbio, France

Vincenzo Saporiti (1606 – 2 January 1664) was a Roman Catholic prelate who served as Bishop of Nebbio (1646–1664).

== Biography ==
Vincenzo Saporiti was born in 1606 in Monte Rosso, Italy. He was Doctor in utroque iure (Civil and Canon Law), Pisa. On 3 December 1646, Vincenzo Saporiti was appointed during the papacy of Pope Innocent X as Bishop of Nebbio. On 21 December 1646, he was consecrated bishop by Giulio Cesare Sacchetti, Cardinal-Priest of Santa Susanna. He served as Bishop of Nebbio until his death on 2 January 1664.

Catholic Church titles
Preceded by Giovanni Mascardi	Bishop of Nebbio; 1646–1664	Succeeded by Francesco Camillo de Mari
