= Francesco Diotallevi =

Italian apostolic nuncio

Most Reverend Francesco Diotallevi
- Bishop of Sant'Angelo dei Lombardi e Bisaccia
- Church: Catholic Church
- Diocese: Diocese of Sant' Angelo de' Lombardi-Bisaccia
- In office: 1614–1622
- Predecessor: Gaspare Paluzzi degli Albertoni
- Successor: Ercole Rangoni
- Previous post: Apostolic Nuncio to Poland (1614–1621)

Orders
- Ordination: 15 August 1614
- Consecration: 31 August 1614 by Giovanni Garzia Mellini

Personal details
- Born: 1579 Rimini, Italy
- Died: May 1622 (aged 42–43)

Francesco Diotallevi (1579 – May 1622) was a Roman Catholic prelate who served as Bishop of Sant'Angelo dei Lombardi e Bisaccia (1614–1622) and Apostolic Nuncio to Poland (1614–1621).

== Biography ==
Francesco Diotallevi was born in Rimini, Italy in 1579. On 21 July 1614, he was appointed during the papacy of Pope Paul V as Bishop of Sant'Angelo dei Lombardi e Bisaccia. On 10 August 1614, he was ordained deacon and on 15 August 1614 as a priest. On 25 August 1614, he was appointed during the papacy of Pope Paul V as Apostolic Nuncio to Poland. On 31 August 1614, he was consecrated bishop by Giovanni Garzia Mellini, Cardinal-Priest of Santi Quattro Coronati, with Michael Rezzi, Bishop of Nusco, and Lorenzo Landi, Bishop of Fossombrone, serving as co-consecrators. In 1621, he resigned as Apostolic Nuncio to Poland. He served as Bishop of Sant'Angelo dei Lombardi e Bisaccia until his death in May 1622.

== External links and additional sources ==
- Cheney, David M. "Diocese of Sant'Angelo dei Lombardi e Bisaccia". Catholic-Hierarchy.org. (for Chronology of Bishops) ^{[self-published]}
- Chow, Gabriel. "Archdiocese of Sant'Angelo dei Lombardi–Conza–Nusco–Bisaccia". GCatholic.org. (for Chronology of Bishops) ^{[self-published]}

Catholic Church titles
Preceded by Lelio Ruini	Apostolic Nuncio to Poland; 1614–1621	Succeeded by Cosimo de Torres
Preceded by Gaspare Paluzzi degli Albertoni	Bishop of Sant'Angelo dei Lombardi e Bisaccia; 1614–1622	Succeeded by Ercole Rangoni
