= Matteo de Senis =

16th-century Roman Catholic bishop

Most Reverend Matteo de Senis
- Bishop of Umbriatico
- Church: Catholic Church
- Diocese: Diocese of Umbriatico
- In office: 1500–1507
- Predecessor: Antonio Guerra (bishop)

Personal details
- Died: 1507

Matteo de Senis (died 1507) was a Roman Catholic prelate who served as Bishop of Umbriatico (1500–1507).

On 7 August 1500, Matteo de Senis was appointed during the papacy of Pope Alexander VI as Bishop of Umbriatico. He served as Bishop of Umbriatico until his death in 1507.

== External links and additional sources ==
- Cheney, David M. "Diocese of Umbriatico (Umbriaticum)". Catholic-Hierarchy.org. (for Chronology of Bishops) ^{[self-published]}
- Chow, Gabriel. "Titular Episcopal See of Umbriatico (Italy)". GCatholic.org. (for Chronology of Bishops) ^{[self-published]}

Catholic Church titles
Preceded by Antonio Guerra (bishop)	Bishop of Umbriatico; 1500–1507	Succeeded by
