= Antonio Ricciulli (iuniore) =

17th-century Roman Catholic bishop

Most Reverend Antonio Ricciulli
- Bishop of Umbriatico
- Church: Catholic Church
- Diocese: Umbriatico
- In office: 1659–1660
- Predecessor: Giuseppe de Rossi
- Successor: Vitaliano Marescano

Orders
- Consecration: 15 Jun 1659 by Francesco Maria Brancaccio

Personal details
- Born: 1615 Rugliano, Italy
- Died: August 1660 (aged 44–45)

Antonio Ricciulli (1615 – August 1660) was a Roman Catholic prelate who served as Bishop of Umbriatico (1659–1660).

== Biography ==
Antonio Ricciulli was born in 1615 in Rugliano, Italy. On 9 June 1659, he was appointed during the papacy of Pope Alexander VII as Bishop of Umbriatico. On 15 June 1659, he was consecrated bishop by Francesco Maria Brancaccio, Cardinal-Priest of Santi XII Apostoli, with Stefano Quaranta, Archbishop of Amalfi, and Persio Caracci, Bishop Emeritus of Larino, serving as co-consecrators. He served as Bishop of Umbriatico until his death in August 1660.

== External links and additional sources ==
- Cheney, David M. "Diocese of Umbriatico (Umbriaticum)". Catholic-Hierarchy.org. (for Chronology of Bishops) ^{[self-published]}
- Chow, Gabriel. "Titular Episcopal See of Umbriatico (Italy)". GCatholic.org. (for Chronology of Bishops) ^{[self-published]}

Catholic Church titles
Preceded by Giuseppe de Rossi	Bishop of Umbriatico; 1659–1660	Succeeded by Vitaliano Marescano
