= Vincenzo Ferrari =

16th-century Roman Catholic bishop

Most Reverend Vincenzo Ferrari
- Bishop of Umbriatico
- Church: Catholic Church
- Diocese: Diocese of Umbriatico
- In office: 1578–1579
- Predecessor: Pietro Bordone
- Successor: Emiliano Bombini
- Previous posts: Bishop of Montepeloso (1564–1578 and 1550–1561)

Personal details
- Died: 1579

Vincenzo Ferrari (died 1579) was a Roman Catholic prelate who served as Bishop of Umbriatico (1578–1579) and Bishop of Montepeloso (1564–1578 and 1550–1561).

== Biography ==
On 5 Nov 1550, Vincenzo Ferrari was appointed during the papacy of Pope Julius III as Bishop of Montepeloso. He resigned in 1561. On 16 Oct 1564, he was reappointed during the papacy of Pope Pius IV as Bishop of Montepeloso. On 2 Jun 1578, he was appointed during the papacy of Pope Gregory XIII as Bishop of Umbriatico. He served as Bishop of Umbriatico until his death in 1579.

== External links and additional sources ==
- Cheney, David M. "Diocese of Montepeloso". Catholic-Hierarchy.org. (Chronology of Bishops) ^{[self-published]}
- Chow, Gabriel. "Diocese of Irsina (Italy)". GCatholic.org. (Chronology of Bishops) ^{[self-published]}
- Cheney, David M. "Diocese of Umbriatico (Umbriaticum)". Catholic-Hierarchy.org. (for Chronology of Bishops) ^{[self-published]}
- Chow, Gabriel. "Titular Episcopal See of Umbriatico (Italy)". GCatholic.org. (for Chronology of Bishops) ^{[self-published]}

Catholic Church titles
Preceded by Ascanio Ferrari	Bishop of Montepeloso; 1550–1561	Succeeded by Giovanni Ludovico da Campania
Preceded by Giovanni Ludovico da Campania	Bishop of Montepeloso; 1564–1578	Succeeded by Lucio Maranta
Preceded by Pietro Bordone	Bishop of Umbriatico; 1578–1579	Succeeded by Emiliano Bombini
