= Alfonso Manzanedo de Quiñones =

Roman Catholic prelate

Most Reverend Alfonso Manzanedo de Quiñones
- Titular Patriarch of Jerusalem
- Church: Catholic Church
- In office: 1622–1627
- Predecessor: Diofebo Farnese
- Successor: Domenico de' Marini (patriarch)

Orders
- Consecration: 8 December 1622 by Ludovico Ludovisi

Personal details
- Born: 1552
- Died: 13 November 1627 (age 75)

Alfonso Manzanedo de Quiñones (1552 – 13 November 1627) was a Roman Catholic prelate who served as Titular Patriarch of Jerusalem (1622–1627).

== Biography ==
Alfonso Manzanedo de Quiñones was born in 1552. On 26 October 1622, he was appointed during the papacy of Pope Gregory XV as Titular Patriarch of Jerusalem. On 8 December 1622, he was consecrated bishop by Ludovico Ludovisi, Archbishop of Bologna with Luigi Caetani, Coadjutor Archbishop of Capua, and Ulpiano Volpi, Bishop of Novara, serving as co-consecrators. He served as Titular Patriarch of Jerusalem until his death on 13 November 1627. While bishop, he was the principal co-consecrator of Giovanni Battista Pamphilj, Titular Patriarch of Antioch (1626).

== External links and additional sources ==
- Cheney, David M. "Patriarchate of Jerusalem {Gerusalemme}". Catholic-Hierarchy.org. (for Chronology of Bishops) ^{[self-published]}
- Chow, Gabriel. "Patriarchal See of Jerusalem (Israel)". GCatholic.org. (for Chronology of Bishops) ^{[self-published]}

Catholic Church titles
Preceded by Diofebo Farnese	Titular Patriarch of Jerusalem; 1622–1627	Succeeded by Domenico de' Marini (patriarch)
