= Paolo Arese =

Roman Catholic prelate

Most Reverend Paolo Arese
- Bishop Emeritus of Tortona
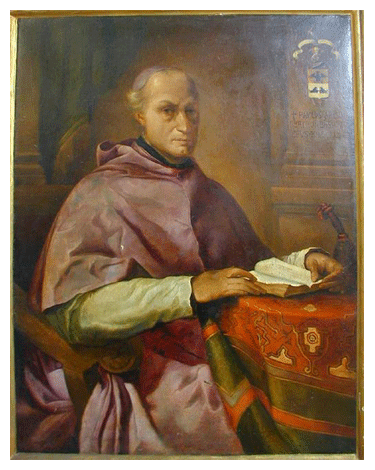
- Church: Catholic Church
- In office: 1620–1644
- Predecessor: Cosimo Dossena
- Successor: Giovanni Francesco Fossati

Orders
- Ordination: 19 October 1598
- Consecration: 20 September 1620 by Giovanni Garzia Mellini

Personal details
- Born: Cesare Arese; 1574 Cremona, Duchy of Milan
- Died: June 14, 1644 (aged 69–70) Tortona, Duchy of Milan

Bishop Paolo Arese C.R. (1574 – 14 June 1644) was a Roman Catholic prelate and scholar who served as Bishop of Tortona (1620–1644).

On 20 July 1620, he was appointed during the papacy of Pope Paul V as Bishop of Tortona. On 20 September 1620, he was consecrated bishop by Giovanni Garzia Mellini, Cardinal-Priest of Santi Quattro Coronati, with Attilio Amalteo, Titular Archbishop of Athenae, and Paolo De Curtis, Bishop Emeritus of Isernia serving as co-consecrators. He served as Bishop of Tortona until his resignation in 1644. He died soon after on 14 June 1644.

== Biography ==
Paolo Arese was born in 1574 to the House of Arese. In early youth he entered the Congregation of Clerics Regular of the Divine Providence, and assumed thenceforth the name of Paolo instead of that of Cesare, which he had received in baptism. His precocious learning gained for him, before he had completed his twenty-fourth year, a lectureship in philosophy and theology at Naples; and he afterwards taught theology at Rome, devoting special attention to homiletics. He was not less successful in the practice of sacred eloquence than in teaching its theory. His fame as a preacher spread all over Italy, although he labored under natural impediments which might have altogether stopped the career of anyone less enthusiastic and resolute. In 1620, when he was confessor at Turin to the Princess Isabella of Savoy, he was appointed by Pope Paul V to the bishopric of Tortona. He held that see for twenty-four years, ending with his death in 1644; and during that long period he distinguished himself highly, not only for his activity in the literature of his profession and for his patronage of literary men, but for the earnestness and zeal with which he performed the ordinary duties of his office.

== Arese and Galileo ==
Paolo Arese was enthused by the celestial discoveries made by Galileo, whom he praised for his astonishing scientific achievements. Being a non-dogmatic Aristotelian philosopher, Arese sought to accommodate any possible disagreements between scientific inquiry and traditional religious ideas. Nonetheless, after the publication of Galileo's Dialogue in 1632, he changed his mind. Both Galileo's indisputable heliocentrism and Urban VIII's early persecution prompted Arese to write a lengthy rebuttal of the Copernicanism, which he interpolated into the last volume of his own most renown book, Le imprese sacre.

== Works ==
Paolo Arese was a voluminous writer, both in Latin and in Italian, and left a large number of manuscripts unpublished. The following are his published Latin works:

- In Libros Aristotelis de Generatione et de Corruptione, Milan, 1617, 4to.
- De aquæ transformatione in Sacrificio Missæ, Tortona, 1622; Antwerp, 1628, 8vo.
- Constitutio Synodalis, Tortona, 1623, 4to.
- De Cantici Canticorum sensu velitatio bina, Milan, 1640, 4to.
- Velitationes Sex in Apocalypsim, Milan, 1647, fol.

His works in Italian are greatly more voluminous; and of those in the following list there is hardly any, which did not pass through several editions in the course of the seventeenth century. An enumeration of editions, with fuller details as to the contents of each work, will be found in Mazzucchelli:

- Arte di predicar bene, Venice, 1611, 4to; his first publication, containing the matter of his lectures on homiletics at Rome.
- Imprese sacre, con triplicati discorsi illustrate ed arricchite, the author's largest and most esteemed work. The substance of it was twice published at Verona, 1613 and 1615, in one volume 4to. Afterwards it was rewritten and enlarged to seven volumes 4to, which were published as follows: vols. I and II at Milan, 1621, 1625, at Tortona and Venice, 1629; vols. III, IV and V, at Tortona, 1630; vol. VI, at Tortona, 1634; vol. VII, at Tortona, 1635. To the first book of the first volume the author made an addition called La penna raffilata, Milan, 1626, fol.; and, as a supplement to the whole work, he published an eighth volume of a polemical cast, entitled Retroguardia in difesa di se stesso, con un trattato dell’arte e scienza impresistica, Genoa, 1640, 4to. There is a Latin translation of a great part of the Sacre Imprese, published at Frankfurt in 1700, 1701 and 1702, in three volumes folio.
- Della tribolazione e suoi rimedj, Tortona, 1624, 2 vols. 4to.
- Panegirici fatti in diverse occasioni, seventeen in number, collected into one volume, Milan, 1644, 8vo.
- Guida dell’anima orante, o sia prattica dell’orazione mentale, Tortona, 1623.

== External links and additional sources ==
- Guerrini, Luigi (2016). "Un epilogo imbarazzante. Paolo Aresi, il sistema copernicano e il 'Dialogo' di Galileo". Giornale Critico della Filosofia Italiana. 95 (1): 63–88. doi:10.1400/272548.
- The Biographical Dictionary of the Society for the Diffusion of Useful Knowledge. Vol. 3. Longman, Brown, Green, and Longmans. 1843. p. 333.
- Andreu, Francisco (1962). "ARESE, Paolo". Dizionario Biografico degli Italiani (in Italian). Vol. 4: Arconati–Bacaredda. Rome: Istituto dell'Enciclopedia Italiana. OCLC 883370.
- Cheney, David M. "Diocese of Tortona". Catholic-Hierarchy.org. (for Chronology of Bishops) ^{[self-published]}
- Chow, Gabriel. "Diocese of Tortona (Italy)". GCatholic.org. (for Chronology of Bishops) ^{[self-published]}

Catholic Church titles
Preceded by Cosimo Dossena	Bishop of Tortona; 1620–1644	Succeeded by Giovanni Francesco Fossati
