= Giovanni Mascardi =

Most Reverend Giovanni Mascardi
- Bishop of Nebbio
- Church: Catholic Church
- Diocese: Diocese of Nebbio
- In office: 1621–1646
- Predecessor: Giuliano Castagnola
- Successor: Vincenzo Saporiti

Orders
- Consecration: 25 April 1621 by Maffeo Barberini

Personal details
- Died: 1646 Saint-Florent, Haute-Corse, Corsica

Giovanni Mascardi (died 1646) was a Roman Catholic prelate who served as Bishop of Nebbio (1621–1646).

== Biography ==
On 19 April 1621, Giovanni Mascardi was appointed during the papacy of Pope Gregory XV as Bishop of Nebbio. He served as Canon of the Cathedral of Mariana. On 25 April 1621, he was consecrated bishop by Maffeo Barberini, Cardinal-Priest of Sant'Onofrio, with Diofebo Farnese, Titular Patriarch of Jerusalem, and Ulpiano Volpi, Bishop of Novara, serving as co-consecrators. He served as Bishop of Nebbio until his death in 1646.

Catholic Church titles
Preceded by Giuliano Castagnola	Bishop of Nebbio; 1621–1646	Succeeded by Vincenzo Saporiti
