= Pietro Bastoni =

Most Reverend Pietro Bastoni
- Bishop of Umbriatico
- Church: Catholic Church
- Diocese: Diocese of Umbriatico
- In office: 1611–1622
- Predecessor: Paolo Emilio Sammarco
- Successor: Benedetto Baaz

Orders
- Consecration: 6 February 1611 by Giovanni Garzia Mellini

Personal details
- Born: 1570
- Died: 1622 (age 52) Umbriatico, Italy

Pietro Bastoni (1570–1622) was a Catholic prelate who served as Bishop of Umbriatico (1611–1622).

== Biography ==
Pietro Bastoni was born in 1570. On 24 January 1611, he was appointed during the papacy of Pope Paul V as Bishop of Umbriatico. On 6 February 1611, he was consecrated bishop by Giovanni Garzia Mellini, Cardinal-Priest of Santi Quattro Coronati, with Jullio del Carretto, Bishop of Casale Monferrato, and Antonio d'Aquino, Bishop of Sarno, serving as co-consecrators. He served as Bishop of Umbriatico until he died in 1622. While bishop, he was the principal co-consecrator of Andrea Pierbenedetti, Bishop of Venosa (1611).

== External links and additional sources ==
- Cheney, David M. "Diocese of Umbriatico (Umbriaticum)". Catholic-Hierarchy.org. (for Chronology of Bishops) ^{[self-published]}
- Chow, Gabriel. "Titular Episcopal See of Umbriatico (Italy)". GCatholic.org. (for Chronology of Bishops) ^{[self-published]}

Catholic Church titles
| Preceded by Paolo Emilio Sammarco | Bishop of Umbriatico; 1611–1622 | Succeeded by Benedetto Baaz |
