= Giovanni Dominico Giaconi =

Most Reverend Giovanni Dominico Giaconi
- Bishop of Guardialfiera
- Church: Catholic Church
- Diocese: Diocese of Guardialfiera
- In office: 1617–1624
- Predecessor: Sebastiano Rinaldi
- Successor: Alexander Liparuli

Personal details
- Born: 1580 Lecce, Italy
- Died: 1624 (aged 43–44)

Giovanni Dominico Giaconi (1580–1624) was a Roman Catholic prelate who served as Bishop of Guardialfiera (1617–1624).

== Biography ==
Giovanni Dominico Giaconi was born in Lecce, Italy in 1580. On 9 January 1617, he was appointed during the papacy of Pope Paul V as Bishop of Guardialfiera. On 22 January 1617, he was consecrated bishop by Felice Centini, Bishop of Macerata e Tolentino, with Giambattista Visconti, Bishop of Teramo, and Innico Siscara, Bishop of Anglona-Tursi, serving as co-consecrators. He served as Bishop of Guardialfiera until his death in 1624.

== External links and additional sources ==
- Cheney, David M. "Diocese of Guardialfiera (Guardia)". Catholic-Hierarchy.org. (for Chronology of Bishops) ^{[self-published]}
- Chow, Gabriel. "Titular Episcopal See of Guardialfiera (Italy)". GCatholic.org. (for Chronology of Bishops) ^{[self-published]}

Catholic Church titles
Preceded by Sebastiano Rinaldi	Bishop of Guardialfiera	Succeeded by Alexander Liparuli
