= Benedetto Baaz =

Most Reverend Benedetto Baaz
- Bishop of Umbriatico
- Church: Catholic Church
- Diocese: Diocese of Umbriatico
- In office: 1622–1631
- Predecessor: Pietro Bastoni
- Successor: Antonio Ricciulli

Orders
- Consecration: 8 May 1622 by Giovanni Garzia Mellini

Personal details
- Died: 1631 Umbriatico, Italy

Benedetto Baaz or Benedetto Vaez (died 1631) was a Roman Catholic prelate who served as Bishop of Umbriatico (1622–1631).

== Biography ==
On 2 May 1622, he was appointed during the papacy of Pope Paul V as Bishop of Umbriatico. On 8 May 1622, he was consecrated bishop by Giovanni Garzia Mellini, Cardinal-Priest of Santi Quattro Coronati with Cesare Ventimiglia, Bishop of Terracina, Priverno e Sezze, and Alfonso Giglioli, Bishop of Anglona-Tursi, serving as co-consecrators. He served as Bishop of Umbriatico until his death in 1631.

== Episcopal succession ==
While bishop, he was the principal co-consecrator of:

- Gaspar Gajosa, Bishop of L'Aquila (1628);
- Patrick Comerford, Bishop of Waterford and Lismore (1629);
- Gaspar de Borja y Velasco, Cardinal-Bishop of Albano (1630); and
- Gil Carrillo de Albornoz, Archbishop of Taranto (1630).

== External links and additional sources ==
- Cheney, David M. "Diocese of Umbriatico (Umbriaticum)". Catholic-Hierarchy.org. (for Chronology of Bishops) ^{[self-published]}
- Chow, Gabriel. "Titular Episcopal See of Umbriatico (Italy)". GCatholic.org. (for Chronology of Bishops) ^{[self-published]}

Catholic Church titles
Preceded by Pietro Bastoni	Bishop of Umbriatico; 1622–1631	Succeeded by Antonio Ricciulli
