= Antonio Guerra (bishop) =

16th-century Roman Catholic bishop

Most Reverend Antonio Guerra
- Bishop of Umbriatico
- Church: Catholic Church
- Diocese: Diocese of Umbriatico
- In office: 1495–1500
- Predecessor: Francesco de Caprusacci
- Successor: Matteo de Senis

Personal details
- Died: 4 August 1500

Antonio Guerra (died 1500) was a Roman Catholic prelate who served as Bishop of Umbriatico (1495–1500).

== Biography ==
On 4 Feb 1495, Antonio Guerra was appointed during the papacy of Pope Alexander VI as Bishop of Umbriatico. He served as Bishop of Umbriatico until his death on 4 Aug 1500.

== External links and additional sources ==
- Cheney, David M. "Diocese of Umbriatico (Umbriaticum)". Catholic-Hierarchy.org. (for Chronology of Bishops) ^{[self-published]}
- Chow, Gabriel. "Titular Episcopal See of Umbriatico (Italy)". GCatholic.org. (for Chronology of Bishops) ^{[self-published]}

Catholic Church titles
Preceded by Francesco de Caprusacci	Bishop of Umbriatico; 1495–1500	Succeeded by Matteo de Senis
