= Domenico Blanditi =

17th-century Roman Catholic bishop

Most Reverend Domenico Blanditi
- Bishop of Umbriatico
- Church: Catholic Church
- Diocese: Diocese of Umbriatico
- In office: 1650–1651
- Predecessor: Ottavio Poderico
- Successor: Tommaso Tomassoni

Orders
- Consecration: 9 Oct 1650 by Giovanni Giacomo Panciroli

Personal details
- Born: Naples, Italy

Domenico Blanditi (died 1651) was a Roman Catholic prelate who served as Bishop of Umbriatico (1650–1651).

== Biography ==
Domenico Blanditi was born in Naples, Italy. On 22 Aug 1650, he was appointed during the papacy of Pope Innocent X as Bishop of Umbriatico. On 9 Oct 1650, he was consecrated bishop by Giovanni Giacomo Panciroli, Cardinal-Priest of Santo Stefano al Monte Celio, with Luca Torreggiani, Archbishop of Ravenna, and Pedro Urbina Montoya, Archbishop of Valencia, serving as co-consecrators. He served as Bishop of Umbriatico until his death in 1651.

== External links and additional sources ==
- Cheney, David M. "Diocese of Umbriatico (Umbriaticum)". Catholic-Hierarchy.org. (for Chronology of Bishops) ^{[self-published]}
- Chow, Gabriel. "Titular Episcopal See of Umbriatico (Italy)". GCatholic.org. (for Chronology of Bishops) ^{[self-published]}

Catholic Church titles
Preceded by Ottavio Poderico	Bishop of Umbriatico; 1650–1651	Succeeded by Tommaso Tomassoni
