= Giovanni Devoti =

Italian canon lawyer

Giovanni Devoti (born at Rome, 11 July 1744; died there 18 September 1820) was an Italian canon lawyer and bishop.

== Life ==
At the age of twenty, he occupied a chair of canon law at the Sapienza University of Rome. After twenty-five years service in this position, Pope Pius VI appointed him Bishop of Anagni.

He resigned the see in 1804, to become titular Archbishop of Carthage. As such, he filled several important positions at Rome. He also accompanied Pope Pius VII during his exile in France.

== Works ==
His works are:

- De notissimis in jure legibus libri duo (Rome, 1766);
- Juris canonici universi publici et privati libri quinque, an unfinished work of which only three volumes appeared (Rome, 1803–1815; new edition, Rome, 1827), containing an introduction to canon law and a commentary on the first and second book of the Decretals;
- Institutionum canonicarum libri quatuor (Rome, 1785; fourth ed., Rome, 1814).

The last work is distinguished by its clearness and conciseness, and by its numerous historical notes, attributed, but without any reason, to Francesco Saverio Castiglioni, afterwards Pope Pius VIII. In 1817, Ferdinand VII of Spain made obligatory the study of the Institutiones of Devoti at the University of Alcalá; and in 1836, the University of Louvain accepted it as a classical manual of canon law. The work subsequently became more useful for the history than for the practice of canon law.
