= Giambattista Visconti =

Italian Catholic bishop (d. 1638)

Most Reverend Giambattista Visconti
- Bishop of Teramo
- Church: Catholic Church
- In office: 1609–1638
- Predecessor: Vincenzo Bugiatti da Montesanto
- Successor: Girolamo Figini-Oddi

Orders
- Consecration: 29 March 1609 by Giovanni Garzia Mellini

Personal details
- Born: Milan, Italy
- Died: 11 May 1638 Teramo, Italy

Giambattista Visconti, O.S.A. (died 11 May 1638) was a Roman Catholic prelate who served as Bishop of Teramo (1609–1638).

== Biography ==
Giambattista Visconti was born in Milan, Italy and ordained a priest in the Order of Saint Augustine. On 16 March 1609, he was appointed during the papacy of Pope Paul V as Bishop of Teramo. On 29 March 1609, he was consecrated bishop by Giovanni Garzia Mellini, Bishop of Imola, with Ottavio Belmosto, Bishop Emeritus of Aleria, and Antonio d'Aquino, Bishop of Sarno serving as co-consecrators. He served as Bishop of Teramo, until his death on 11 May 1638.

While bishop, he was the principal co-consecrator of Giovanni Dominico Giaconi, Bishop of Guardialfiera (1617); and Giovanni Michele de Varolis, Bishop of Cefalonia e Zante (1625).

== External links and additional sources ==
- Cheney, David M. "Diocese of Teramo-Atri". Catholic-Hierarchy.org. (for Chronology of Bishops)
- Chow, Gabriel. "Diocese of Teramo-Atri (Italy)". GCatholic.org. (for Chronology of Bishops)

Catholic Church titles
Preceded by Vincenzo Bugiatti da Montesanto	Bishop of Teramo; 1609–1638	Succeeded by Girolamo Figini-Oddi
