= Giovanni Battista Monti (bishop) =

17th-century Roman Catholic bishop

Most Reverend Giovanni Battista Monti
- Bishop of San Severo
- Church: Catholic Church
- Diocese: Diocese of San Severo
- In office: 1655–1657
- Predecessor: Leonardo Severoli
- Successor: Francesco Densa

Orders
- Consecration: 17 Oct 1655 by Federico Sforza

Personal details
- Born: 1607 Ferrandina, Italy
- Died: 1657 (aged 49–50)

Giovanni Battista Monti (1607–1657) was a Roman Catholic prelate who served as Bishop of San Severo (1655–1657).

== Biography ==
Giovanni Battista Monti was born in 1607 in Ferrandina, Italy. On 11 Oct 1655, he was appointed during the papacy of Pope Alexander VII as Bishop of San Severo. On 17 Oct 1655, he was consecrated bishop Federico Sforza, Cardinal-Deacon of Santi Vito, Modesto e Crescenzia, with Giovanni Francesco Passionei, Bishop of Pesaro, and Michele Angelo Vincentini, Bishop of Gerace, serving as co-consecrators. He served as Bishop of San Severo until his death in 1657.

== External links and additional sources ==
- Cheney, David M. "Diocese of San Severo". Catholic-Hierarchy.org. (for Chronology of Bishops) ^{[self-published]}
- Chow, Gabriel. "Diocese of San Severo (Italy)". GCatholic.org. (for Chronology of Bishops) ^{[self-published]}

Catholic Church titles
Preceded by Leonardo Severoli	Bishop of San Severo; 1655–1657	Succeeded by Francesco Densa
