= Giuseppe de Rossi (bishop of Umbriatico) =

Roman Catholic prelate

Most Reverend Giuseppe de Rossi
- Bishop of Umbriatico
- Church: Catholic Church
- Diocese: Diocese of Umbriatico
- In office: 1655–1659
- Predecessor: Tommaso Tomassoni
- Successor: Antonio Ricciulli (iuniore)

Orders
- Consecration: 11 July 1655 by Francesco Maria Brancaccio

Personal details
- Born: 1610 Naples, Italy
- Died: 1659 (age 49) Rome, Italy

Giuseppe de Rossi, O.F.M. Conv. (1610–1659) was a Roman Catholic prelate who served as Bishop of Umbriatico (1655–1659).

== Biography ==
Giuseppe de Rossi was born in Naples, Italy and ordained a priest in the Order of Friars Minor Conventual. On 9 July 1655, he was appointed during the papacy of Pope Alexander VII as Bishop of Umbriatico. On 11 July 1655, he was consecrated bishop by Francesco Maria Brancaccio, Bishop of Viterbo e Tuscania. He served as Bishop of Umbriatico until his death in 1659.

== External links and additional sources ==
- Cheney, David M. "Diocese of Umbriatico (Umbriaticum)". Catholic-Hierarchy.org. (for Chronology of Bishops) ^{[self-published]}
- Chow, Gabriel. "Titular Episcopal See of Umbriatico (Italy)". GCatholic.org. (for Chronology of Bishops) ^{[self-published]}

Catholic Church titles
Preceded by Tommaso Tomassoni	Bishop of Umbriatico; 1655–1659	Succeeded by Antonio Ricciulli (iuniore)
