= Alessandro Filarete =

17th-century Roman Catholic bishop

Most Reverend Alessandro Filarete
- Bishop of Umbriatico
- Church: Catholic Church
- Diocese: Diocese of Umbriatico
- In office: 1592–1608
- Predecessor: Emiliano Bombini
- Successor: Paolo Emilio Sammarco

Personal details
- Died: 1608

Alessandro Filarete (died 1608) was a Roman Catholic prelate who served as Bishop of Umbriatico (1592–1608).

== Biography ==
On 12 Aug 1592, Alessandro Filarete was appointed during the papacy of Pope Clement VIII as Bishop of Umbriatico. He served as Bishop of Umbriatico until his death in 1608.

While bishop, he was the principal co-consecrator of Marcello Lorenzi, Bishop of Strongoli (1600).

== External links and additional sources ==
- Cheney, David M. "Diocese of Umbriatico (Umbriaticum)". Catholic-Hierarchy.org. (for Chronology of Bishops) ^{[self-published]}
- Chow, Gabriel. "Titular Episcopal See of Umbriatico (Italy)". GCatholic.org. (for Chronology of Bishops) ^{[self-published]}

Catholic Church titles
Preceded by Emiliano Bombini	Bishop of Umbriatico; 1592–1608	Succeeded by Paolo Emilio Sammarco
