= Francesco de Caprusacci =

1xth-century Roman Catholic bishop

Most Reverend Francesco de Caprusacci
- Bishop of Umbriatico
- Church: Catholic Church
- Diocese: Diocese of Umbriatico
- In office: 1475–1494
- Successor: Antonio Guerra (bishop)

Personal details
- Died: 1494

Francesco de Caprusacci (died 1494) was a Roman Catholic prelate who served as Bishop of Umbriatico (1475–1494).

== Biography ==
On 3 Mar 1475, Francesco de Caprusacci was appointed during the papacy of Pope Sixtus IV as Bishop of Umbriatico. He served as Bishop of Umbriatico until his death in 1494.

== External links and additional sources ==
- Cheney, David M. "Diocese of Umbriatico (Umbriaticum)". Catholic-Hierarchy.org. (for Chronology of Bishops) ^{[self-published]}
- Chow, Gabriel. "Titular Episcopal See of Umbriatico (Italy)". GCatholic.org. (for Chronology of Bishops) ^{[self-published]}

Catholic Church titles
| Preceded by | Bishop of Umbriatico; 1475–1494 | Succeeded by Antonio Guerra (bishop) |
