= Tommaso Tomassoni =

Most Reverend Tommaso Tomassoni
- Bishop of Umbriatico
- Church: Catholic Church
- Diocese: Diocese of Umbriatico
- In office: 1652–1654
- Predecessor: Domenico Blanditi
- Successor: Giuseppe de Rossi

Orders
- Consecration: 21 January 1652 by Marcantonio Franciotti

Personal details
- Born: 1616 Rome, Italy
- Died: October 1654 (age 38) Umbriatico, Italy

Tommaso Tomassoni, O.P. (1616 – October 1654) was a Roman Catholic prelate who served as Bishop of Umbriatico (1652–1654).

== Biography ==
Tommaso Tomassoni was born in Rome, Italy in 1616 and ordained a priest in the Order of Preachers. On 8 January 1652, he was appointed during the papacy of Pope Innocent X as Bishop of Umbriatico. On 21 January 1652, he was consecrated bishop by Marcantonio Franciotti, Cardinal-Priest of Santa Maria della Pace, with Ranuccio Scotti Douglas, Bishop Emeritus of Borgo San Donnino, and Patrizio Donati, Bishop Emeritus of Minori, serving as co-consecrators. He served as Bishop of Umbriatico until his death in October 1654. While bishop, he was the principal co-consecrator of Francesco Gozzadini, Bishop of Cefalonia e Zante (1654).

== External links and additional sources ==
- Cheney, David M. "Diocese of Umbriatico (Umbriaticum)". Catholic-Hierarchy.org. (for Chronology of Bishops) ^{[self-published]}
- Chow, Gabriel. "Titular Episcopal See of Umbriatico (Italy)". GCatholic.org. (for Chronology of Bishops) ^{[self-published]}

Catholic Church titles
Preceded by Domenico Blanditi	Bishop of Umbriatico; 1652–1654	Succeeded by Giuseppe de Rossi
