= Luigi Capponi =

Italian cardinal

His Eminence Luigi Capponi
- Archbishop of Ravenna
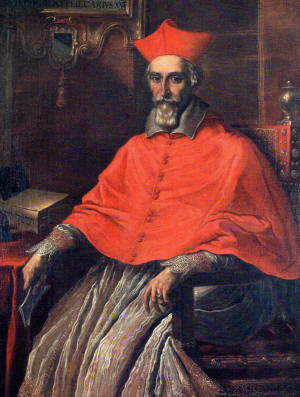
- Church: Catholic Church
- Archdiocese: Ravenna
- Appointed: 3 March 1621
- Term ended: 18 September 1645
- Predecessor: Pietro Aldobrandini
- Successor: Luca Torreggiani
- Other posts: Cardinal-Priest of San Lorenzo in Lucina (1629-1659)
- Previous posts: Cardinal-Deacon of Sant'Agata de' Goti (1608-1620); Cardinal-Priest of San Pietro in Vincoli (1622-1629)

Orders
- Created cardinal: 24 November 1608 by Pope Paul V
- Rank: Cardinal-Priest

Personal details
- Born: 1582 Florence, Italy
- Died: 6 April 1659 (aged 76–77) Rome, Papal States

Luigi Capponi (1582 – 6 April 1659) was an Italian Catholic cardinal who became archbishop of Ravenna.

== Biography ==
Capponi was born in 1582, the son of Senator Francesco Capponi and Ludovica Macchiavelli. The Capponi family had extensive links to Italian political circles and to senior members of the Catholic Church. He was educated at the Archgymnasium of Rome where he received a doctorate and became a papal prelate and then treasurer of the Apostolic Chamber. He became a close friend of Cardinal Bonifazio Bevilacqua Aldobrandini.

On 24 November 1608, he was elevated to cardinal and was installed as cardinal-deacon of Sant'Agata dei Goti. In 1614, he was appointed legate in Bologna but fell ill and Cardinal Giulio Savelli was appointed in his place. When he recovered he was appointed cardinal-deacon of Sant'Angelo in Pescheria.

In 1621, he participated in the one-day-long papal conclave which elected Pope Gregory XV. The following month, Capponi was elected archbishop of Ravenna, a position he held for the next 24 years.

Over the next decade, Capponi was appointed cardinal-priest at a range of churches including San Carlo ai Catinari (1621), San Pietro in Vincoli (1622) and San Lorenzo in Lucina (1629). He also participated in the papal conclave of 1623 which elected Pope Urban VIII.

In 1642, Capponi was appointed co-legate of Bologna, Ferrara and Romandiola along with Pope Urban's cardinal-nephew, Antonio Barberini. When Urban died in 1644, Capponi participated in the papal conclave of 1644 which elected Pope Innocent X.

In 1645, he resigned as archbishop and was appointed prefect of the Sacra Congregatio de Propaganda Fide while Antonio Barberini was in exile in France. In 1649 he was appointed librarian of the Holy Roman Church. He participated in the conclave of 1655.

In 1650, Capponi was visited by French adventurer, François de La Boullaye-Le Gouz. La Boullaye dedicated the first printed edition of his work to the cardinal. The preface includes an illustration of the adventurer presenting the work to Capponi.

Capponi died on 6 April 1659.

Capponi made substantial renovations to the Villa La Pietra in Florence, adding the Baroque exterior, thought to have been designed by Carlo Fontana.

Catholic Church titles
Preceded by Pietro Aldobrandini	Archbishop of Ravenna; 1621–1645	Succeeded by Luca Torreggiani
Preceded by Giovanni Garzia Millini	Cardinal-Priest of San Lorenzo in Lucina; 1629–1659	Succeeded by Girolamo Colonna
Preceded by Orazio Giustiniani	Librarian of the Holy Roman Church; 1649–1659	Succeeded by Flavio Chigi
