= Paolo Emilio Sammarco =

Roman Catholic Bishop of Umbriatico in the 17th century

Most Reverend Paolo Emilio Sammarco
- Bishop of Umbriatico
- Church: Catholic Church
- In office: 1609–1610
- Predecessor: Alessandro Filarete
- Successor: Pietro Bastoni

Orders
- Ordination: 1576
- Consecration: 24 February 1609 by Giovanni Garzia Mellini

Personal details
- Died: 1610 (age 60) Umbriatico, Italy

Paolo Emilio Sammarco (died 1610) was a Roman Catholic prelate who served as Bishop of Umbriatico (1609–1610).

== Biography ==
Paolo Emilio Sammarco was born in Rossano, Italy and ordained a priest in 1576. On 16 February 1609, he was appointed during the papacy of Pope Paul V as Bishop of Umbriatico. On 24 February 1609, he was consecrated bishop by Giovanni Garzia Mellini, Bishop of Imola, with Antonio d'Aquino, Bishop of Sarno, and Gaspare Paluzzi degli Albertoni, Bishop of Sant'Angelo dei Lombardi e Bisaccia, serving as co-consecrators. He served as Bishop of Umbriatico until his death in 1610.

== External links and additional sources ==
- Cheney, David M. "Diocese of Umbriatico (Umbriaticum)". Catholic-Hierarchy.org. (for Chronology of Bishops) ^{[self-published]}
- Chow, Gabriel. "Titular Episcopal See of Umbriatico (Italy)". GCatholic.org. (for Chronology of Bishops) ^{[self-published]}

Catholic Church titles
Preceded by Alessandro Filarete	Bishop of Umbriatico; 1609–1610	Succeeded by Pietro Bastoni
