= Diocese of San Severo =

Roman Catholic diocese in Italy

Coordinates: 41.6951°N 15.3793°E

Diocese of San Severo Dioecesis Sancti Severi

Catholic
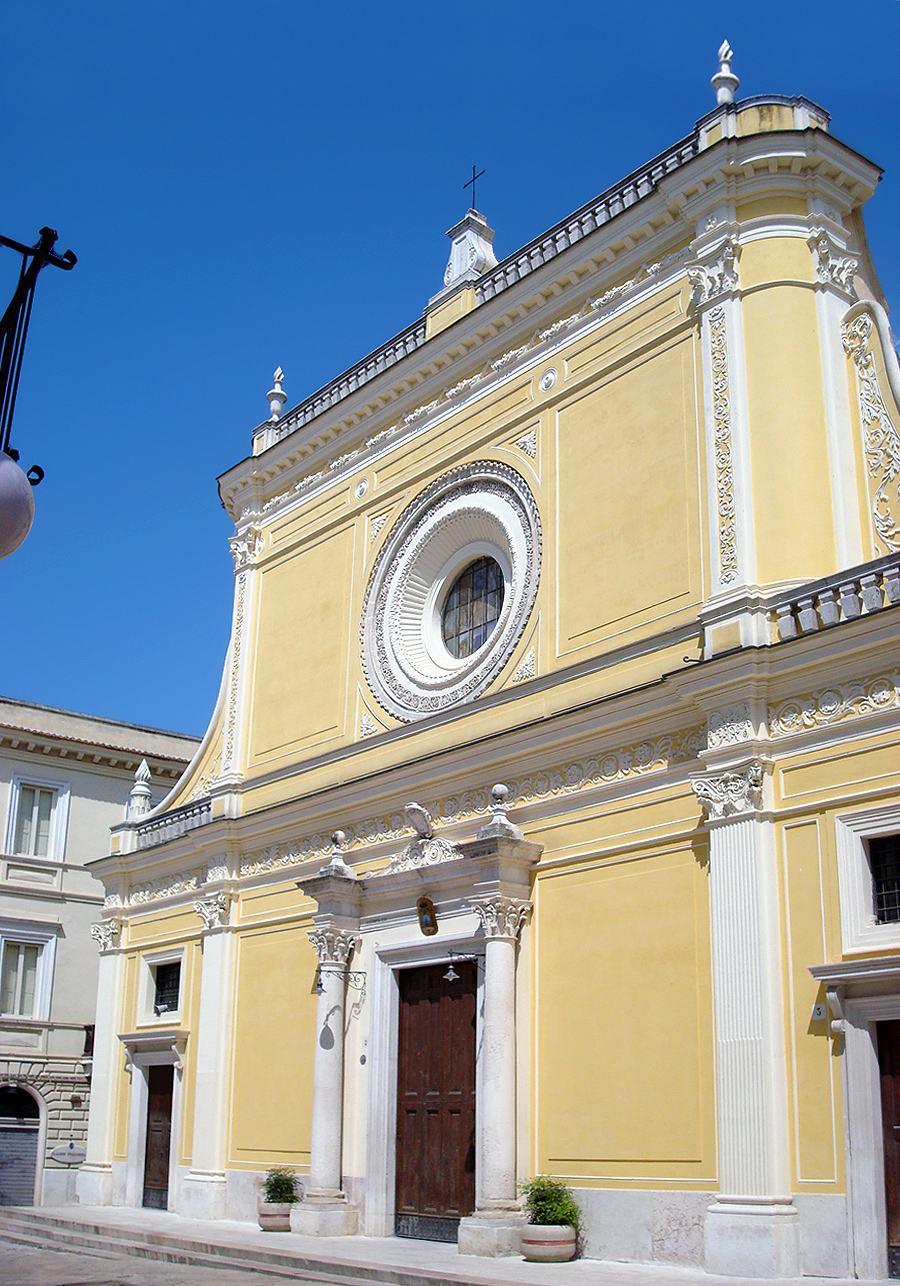
- San Severo Cathedral

Location
- Country: Italy
- Ecclesiastical province: Foggia-Bovino

Statistics
- Area: 1,270 km^{2} (490 sq mi)
- Population: Total; Catholics: (as of 2023); 115,400 ▼; 103,500 (guess) ▼
- Parishes: 35

Information
- Denomination: Catholic Church
- Rite: Latin Rite
- Established: 16th century
- Cathedral: Cattedrale di S. Maria Assunta
- Secular priests: 51 (diocesan) ▼2 (Religious Orders); 2 Permanent Deacons

Current leadership
- Pope: Leo XIV
- Bishop: Giuseppe Mengoli
- Metropolitan Archbishop: Giorgio Ferretti
- Bishops emeritus: Lucio Angelo Renna, O. Carm.

Website
- www.diocesisansevero.it

The Diocese of San Severo (Latin: Dioecesis Sancti Severi) is a Latin diocese of the Catholic Church in Apulia. It is a suffragan of the Archdiocese of Foggia-Bovino.

== History ==
The diocese of San Severo was established on 9 March 1580 by Pope Gregory XIII, with the bull "In Eminenti". The bull specifically states that the city of Civitas (Città), a town now called San Paolo di Civitate, was practically uninhabited and levelled to the ground, and that there were scarcely any traces of a cathedral. The See of Civitas was vacant, since its bishop, Cardinal Francesco Alciati, had just resigned. Therefore, the seat of the vacant bishopric and the name and title of cathedral was transferred to the town (oppidum) of San Severo, which was fortified by walls and towers, and had a moderate population and several nobles, as well as four parishes. The parish church of S. Mary the Virgin was promoted to the status of a cathedral, and the seat of the bishop erected there. The diocese of San Severo was made a suffragan (subordinate) of the Archbishop of Benevento.

To this diocese was later added the territory of the ancient Dragonara, a city built in 1005 by the Byzantine Governor of Apulia. Cappelletti gives the names of twenty-eight bishops of Dragonara between 1061 and 1657.

On 30 July 1627, a major earthquake struck San Severo, with a loss of life of some 800 persons. Churches and buildings were ruined. "Sansevero città è disfatta in tutto," wrote one witness. Tremors continued for a year, causing many inhabitants to give up and migrate elsewhere.

Between November 1656 and May 1657, the province of Capitanata and the city of San Severo were visited by the plague, causing the deaths of 3,000 people in the city, including Bishop Giovanni Battista Monti.

In 1703 the population was only around 3,000 persons.

Other earthquakes caused serious damage in February 1828 and on 14 August 1851.

=== Cathedral and Chapter ===
The cathedral of San Severo, dedicated to the taking up (assumption) of the body of the Virgin Mary into heaven, was consecrated by Cardinal Vincenzo Maria Orsini, O.P., Archbishop of Manfredonia (Siponto). The church of S. Antonio was united to the cathedral, along with its hospice, at which travellers would be received for three nights' sleeping accommodation; it also received the sick. The Prior of the hospice was elected annually by the cathedral Chapter.

The cathedral was administered by a Chapter, composed of three dignities (the Archdeacon, the Archpriest and the Primicerius) and twelve Canons. One of the Canons was designated the Canon Penitentiarius and another the Canon Theologus, according to a decree of Bishop Malaspina.

=== Synods ===
A diocesan synod was an irregularly held, but important, meeting of the bishop of a diocese and his clergy. Its purpose was (1) to proclaim generally the various decrees already issued by the bishop; (2) to discuss and ratify measures on which the bishop chose to consult with his clergy; (3) to publish statutes and decrees of the diocesan synod, of the provincial synod, and of the Holy See.

Synods were held by: Bishops Malaspina (1583–1604) in 1598; Densa (1658-1670), and Fortunato (1670-1678). Bishop Francesco Antonio Sacchetti (1635-1648) held two synods. Bishop Carlo Felice de Matta (1678-1701) held his third diocesan synod on 15 August 1681; it was the ninth synod in the diocese's history. A diocesan synod was held by Bishop Adeodato Summantico, O.E.S.A. (1717- 1735) on 30–31 October 1720; he held a second synod on 15 August 1726. Bishop Giovanni Camillo Rossi held a diocesan synod on 18 May 1823, and published its decrees. Bishop Francesco Orlando (1942-1960) held a diocesan synod in San Severo in 1949.

=== A different metropolitan ===
A major administrative reorganization of the dioceses of Apulia took place in 1979.

Following the Second Vatican Council, and in accordance with the norms laid out in the council's decree, Christus Dominus chapter 40, the Episcopal Conference of Apulia petitioned the Holy See (Pope) that Foggio be made a metropolitan and that a new ecclesiastical province be organized; Foggia was, at the time, directly dependent upon the Holy See, even though it was the capital of a civil province of Italy.

After wide consultations among all affected parties, Pope John Paul II issued the bull "Sacrorum Antistites" on 30 April 1979, in which he, first of all, dissolved the ecclesiastical province of Siponto (Manfredonia), and elevated Foggia to the status of metropolitan see. He then created the new ecclesiastical province of Foggia, whose constituent bishoprics (suffragans) were to be: Manfredonia (no longer a metropolitanate, though the archbishop was allowed to retain the title of archbishop); Troiana (which had previously been directly subject to the Holy See); Ascoli e Cerinola, Bovino, Lucera and San Severo (all of which had been suffragans of the metropolitanate of Benevento); and Vestana (which had been a suffragan of Manfredonia).

== Bishops of Civitas (Civitate, Città) ==
...

- Amalgerius (attested 1057–1065)

...

- Rogerius (attested 1075)

...

- Joannes (attested 1144)

...

- Robertus (attested 1179)

...

- Donadeus (1254– ? )

...

- Petrus (attested 1303, 1304)
- Joannes (attested 1310)
- Hugo (attested 1318–1324)

...

- Joannes
- Christianus
- Matthaeus, O.Min.
- Matthaeus
- Jacobus
- Benedictus Roman Obedience
- Petrus (1388-1401) Roman Obedience
- Stephanus
- Joannes (1401-1412)

Sede vacante (1412–1477)

Jacopo Minutolo (1412–1425) Administrator
Jacopo Caracciolo (1425–1439) Administrator
From 1439 to 1471 the diocese of S. Severo was united to the diocese of Lucera, in the person of one single bishop.

- Antonius (1477–1479)
- Nicolaus (1480–1495)
- Gudiel de Cervatos (1495– c.1500)
- Thomas da Nola (1500–1503)
- Pancratius Rotondi (1504)
- Roberto Tebaldeschi (1505–1517)
- Gaspare Antonio del Monte (1517–1545)
- Lucas Gauricus (1545–1550)
- Geraldo Rambaldo (1550–1571)
- Francesco Alciati (1571–1580)

== Bishops of San Severo ==
=== 1581 to 1804 ===
- Martino de Martini, S.J. (1581–1583)
- Germanicus Malaspina (1583–1604)
- Ottaviano della Vipera (15 Dec 1604- 13 Jan 1606)
- Cardinal Fabrizio Verallo (1606-1615 Resigned)
- Vincenzo Caputo (23 Mar 1615–1625)
- Francesco Venturi (9 Jun 1625- 1629 Resigned)
- Domenico Ferro (3 Dec 1629- Jul 1635)
- Francesco Antonio Sacchetti (1 Oct 1635–1648)
- Leonardus Severoli (27 Jun 1650- 1652)
- Giovanni Battista Monti (11 Oct 1655- 1657)
- Francesco Densa (28 Jan 1658- 6 Aug 1670)
- Orazio Fortunato (1670-1678)
- Carlo Felice de Matta (6 Jun 1678- 26 Feb 1701)
- Carlo Francesco Giocoli (16 Jul 1703–1717)
- Adeodato Summantico, O.E.S.A. (1717-1735)
- Gennaro Scalea (1736-1739)
- Bartolomeo Mollo (16 Nov 1739- 20 Jul 1761)
- Angelo Antonio Pallante (23 Nov 1761- 1 Oct 1765)
- Tommaso Battiloro (14 Apr 1766- 25 Nov 1767 Resigned)
- Eugenio Benedetto Scaramuccia (25 Jan 1768- 19 Jan 1775)
- Giuseppe Antonio Farao (13 Nov 1775- 1794)
- Giovanni Gaetano del Muscio, Sch. P. (18 Dec 1797–1804)

=== 1804 to present ===
Sede vacante (1804 – 1818)

- Camillo Giovanni Rossi (26 Jun 1818 – 9 Apr 1827 Resigned)
- Bernardo Rossi (3 Jul 1826 – 27 Jul 1829)

Sede vacante (1829 – 1832)

- Giulio de Tommasi (2 Jul 1832 – 6 Jan 1843)
- Rocco de Gregorio (19 Jun 1843 – 8 Jul 1858)
- Antonio La Scala (27 Sep 1858 – 25 Apr 1889)
- Bernardo Gaetani d’Aragona, O.S.B. (25 Apr 1889 – 9 Feb 1893)
- Stanislao Maria de Luca (18 May 1894 – 7 Jan 1895)
- Bonaventura Gargiulo, O.F.M. Cap. (18 Mar 1895 – 9 May 1904)
- Emanuele Merra (27 Mar 1905 – 21 Jul 1911)
- Gaetano Pizzi (5 Nov 1912 – 16 Jun 1921)
- Oronzo Luciano Durante (7 Jun 1922 – 5 Nov 1941)
- Francesco Orlando (4 Sep 1942 – 2 Aug 1960)
- Valentino Vailati (8 Dec 1960 – 1970)
- Angelo Criscito (27 Jun 1970 – 7 Sep 1985 Retired)
- Carmelo Cassati, M.S.C. (7 Sep 1985 – 15 Dec 1990)
- Silvio Cesare Bonicelli (2 Sep 1991 – 13 Dec 1996)
- Michele Seccia (20 Jun 1997 – 24 Jun 2006)
- Lucio Angelo Renna, O. Carm. (2 Sep 2006 – 13 Jan 2017 Retired)
- Giovanni Checchinato (13 Jan 2017 – 10 Dec 2022)
- Giuseppe Mengoli (1 Mar 2023 – Present)

== See also ==
- Roman Catholic Diocese of Dragonara

== Bibliography ==
=== Reference for bishops ===
- Gams, Pius Bonifatius (1873). Series episcoporum Ecclesiae catholicae: quotquot innotuerunt a beato Petro apostolo (in Latin). Ratisbon: Typis et Sumptibus Georgii Josephi Manz. pp. 923–924.
- Eubel, Conradus, ed. (1913). Hierarchia catholica (in Latin). Vol. Tomus 1 (second ed.). Münster: Libreria Regensbergiana.
- Eubel, Conradus, ed. (1914). Hierarchia catholica (in Latin). Vol. Tomus 2 (second ed.). Münster: Libreria Regensbergiana.
- Gulik, Guilelmus (1923). Eubel, Conradus (ed.). Hierarchia catholica (in Latin). Vol. Tomus 3 (second ed.). Münster: Libreria Regensbergiana.
- Gauchat, Patritius (Patrice) (1935). Hierarchia catholica (in Latin). Vol. Tomus IV (1592-1667). Münster: Libraria Regensbergiana.
- Ritzler, Remigius; Sefrin, Pirminus (1952). Hierarchia catholica medii et recentis aevi V (1667-1730). Patavii: Messagero di S. Antonio.
- Ritzler, Remigius; Sefrin, Pirminus (1958). Hierarchia catholica medii et recentis aevi (in Latin). Vol. Tomus VI (1730-1799). Patavii: Messagero di S. Antonio.
- Ritzler, Remigius; Sefrin, Pirminus (1968). Hierarchia Catholica medii et recentioris aevi sive summorum pontificum, S. R. E. cardinalium, ecclesiarum antistitum series... A pontificatu Pii PP. VII (1800) usque ad pontificatum Gregorii PP. XVI (1846) (in Latin). Vol. VII. Monasterii: Libr. Regensburgiana.
- Remigius Ritzler; Pirminus Sefrin (1978). Hierarchia catholica Medii et recentioris aevi... A Pontificatu PII PP. IX (1846) usque ad Pontificatum Leonis PP. XIII (1903) (in Latin). Vol. VIII. Il Messaggero di S. Antonio.
- Pięta, Zenon (2002). Hierarchia catholica medii et recentioris aevi... A pontificatu Pii PP. X (1903) usque ad pontificatum Benedictii PP. XV (1922) (in Latin). Vol. IX. Padua: Messagero di San Antonio. ISBN 978-88-250-1000-8.

=== Studies ===
- Cappelletti, Giuseppe (1864). Le chiese d'Italia: dalla loro origine sino ai nostri giorni (in Italian). Venezia: G. Antonelli. pp. 321–336.
- De Ambrosio, Francesco (1875). Memorie storiche della città di Sansevero in Capitanata (in Italian). De Angelis.
- Tura, Severino (1848), "San Severino," in: Vincenzo D'Avino (1848). Cenni storici sulle chiese arcivescovili, vescovili, e prelatizie (nulluis) del Regno delle Due Sicilie (in Italian). dalle stampe di Ranucci. pp. 602–606.
- Ughelli, Ferdinando; Coleti, Niccolo (1721). Italia sacra, sive De episcopis Italiae et insularum adjacentium. Vol. Tomus octavus (8). Venice: Apud Sebastianum Coleti. pp. 270–274, 358–367.
