= Roman Catholic Diocese of Nebbio =

Former Roman Catholic diocese in Corsica

Coordinates: 42.68°N 9.30°E

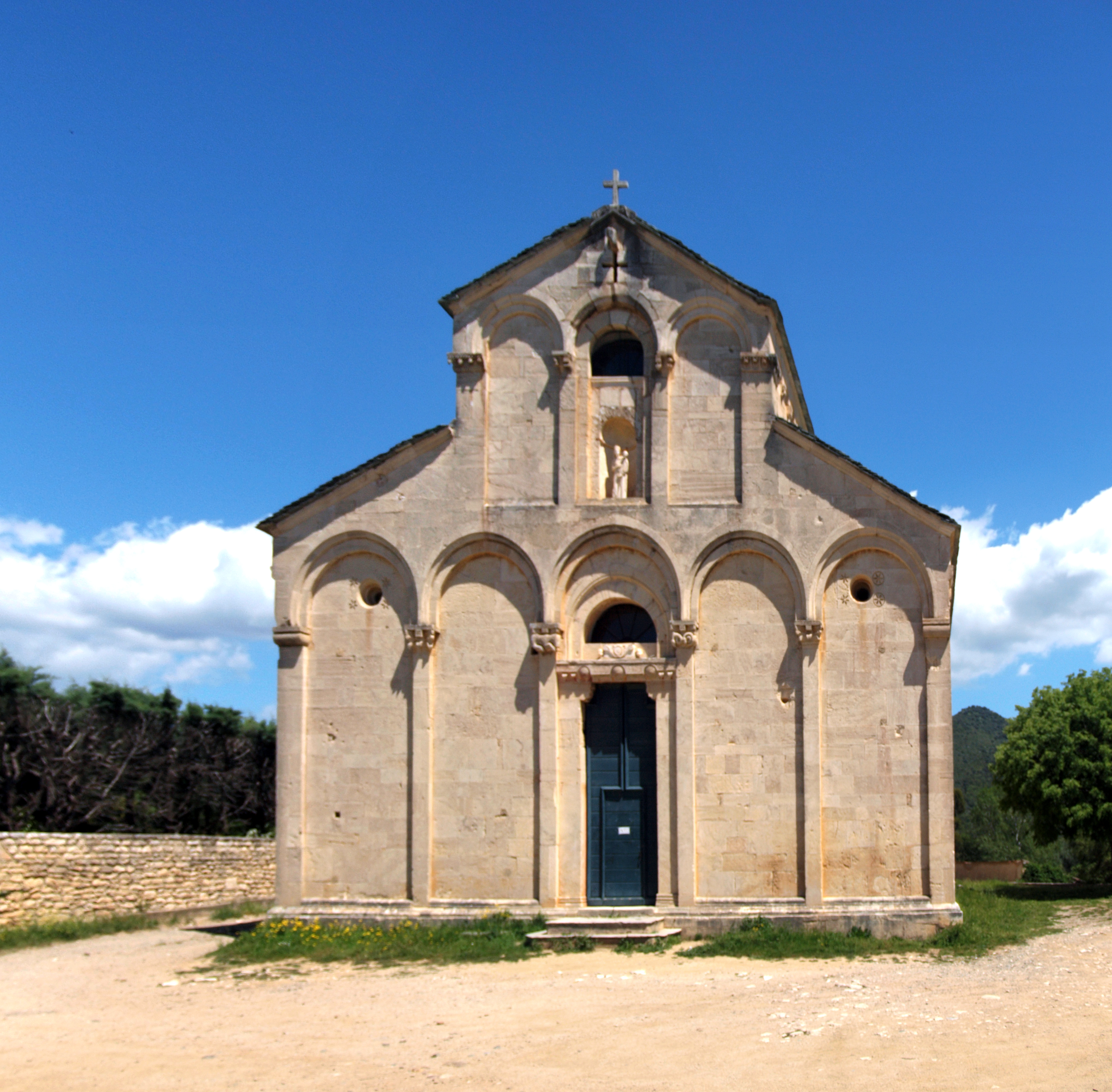
Cathedral of Nebbio (Saint-Florent, Corsica)

The Diocese of Nebbio (Latin: Dioecesis Nebiensis) was a Roman Catholic diocese located in the town of Saint-Florent in Corsica. The cathedral is on a low hill one mile from the port of Saint-Florent. In the Medieval period the Bishop of Nebbio was also the temporal lord of nearly all the lands in his diocese. In 1667, Nebbio was completely abandoned and the bishop lived in Saint-Florent, a town of about 200 inhabitants, under the dominion of the Republic of Genoa. The diocese had some 22 places. The Cathedral Chapter had two dignities, the Archdeacon and the Provost, and three Canons. In 1770 the diocese was under the dominion of the King of France, and Saint-Fleur had about 600 inhabitants. The Chapter of the Cathedral still existed, with two dignities and six Canons.

The diocese of Nebbio was suppressed by the National Constituent Assembly through the Civil Constitution of the Clergy in 1790. In 1801, under the consulate, it was suppressed through the Concordat of 1801, which was given effect by a bull of Pope Pius VII of 29 November 1801. The diocese of Nebbio and its territory were assigned to the Diocese of Ajaccio.

== History ==
The mythical founding of the five cities of Corsica, in which Nebbino was a nephew of the founder, Corso, is retailed by Anton-Pietro Filippini (1594). Filippini attributes the founding of the cathedral, dedicated to the Assumption of the Virgin Mary, to the year 824, though Ughelli wrote that the bell tower belonged to AD 700.

Ughelli claims a bishop named Martin, who is supposed to have attended the Lateran Synod under Pope Martinus I in 649, but, as Giuseppe Cappelletti points out, neither the name of the bishop nor the name of the See can be found in the manuscripts relating to the Synod.

When he was in Pisa, fleeing from Emperor Henry V, Pope Gelasius (1118–1119) appointed the Bishop of Pisa to be the Metropolitan of three of the dioceses on the island of Corsica, Aleria, Mariana, and Nebbio. Bishop Peter was sent to Corsica along with Cardinal Peter of Santa Susanna in 1119, where they held a Synod in Mariana and consecrated the little cathedral there.

The Archbishop of Genoa became the Metropolitan of Nebbio under Pope Innocent II in 1133.

By a decree of the Constituent Assembly on 12 July 1790, the number of dioceses on the island of Corsica had been reduced from five to one. The 'Diocese de Corse' was to be situated in the city of Ajaccio. In accordance with the Civil Constitution of the Clergy, which was approved by King Louis XVI on 26 December 1790, each new departement in France was expected to elect its 'Constitutional Bishop'. The electors, who did not have to be Catholics, duly met and elected Msgr. Ignace-François Guasco, the Provost (or Dean) of the Cathedral Chapter of Mariana, as the 'Bishop of Corse'. Bishop Dominique de Santini of Nebbio went into exile in 1791, and found refuge in Rome. His diocese was never restored, and the 'Diocese of Corse' became the Diocese of Ajaccio after the signing of the Concordat of 1801 and papal enabling legislation.

== Bishops ==
=== Diocese of Nebbio ===
Erected: ?
Latin Name: Nebiensis

...

- Guglielmo (1118)
- Landolfo (1138)
- Guglielmo (1145)

...

- Rolandus (attested in 1209)

...

- Giovanni (1283 – 1311)
- Percevallus, O.Min. (13 June 1312 – 1329)
- Fr. Rafaelle Spinola, O.Min. (1332 – 1357)
- Julianus, O.Min. (20 June 1357 – 13 July 1363)
- Petrus Raimundi, O.Carm. (21 July 1363 – 10 April 1364)
- Rafaelle de Cancello, O.P. (10 April 1364 – ? )
- Thomas ( ? – died 1392)
- Petrus (15 July 1392 – 1414)
- Antonio Surracha (22 June 1414 – 20 March 1415)
- Cardinal Pietro Stefaneschi (Annibaldi), Administrator (20 Mar 1415 – 30 Oct 1417 Died)
- Antonio Viti de Cassia, O.Min. (23 February 1418 – 1432)
- Franciscus de Praefectis (19 March 1432 – 1462)
- Oberto Pinelli (Penani) (9 February 1463 –1480)
- Battista de Saluzzo (22 March 1480 – 4 September 1514)
- Agostino Giustiniani, O.P. (22 September 1514 – 1536)
- Cardinal Girolamo Doria, Administrator of the diocese (15 Nov 1536 – 28 Jun 1538 Resigned)
- Andrea Grimaldi (28 Jun 1538 – 1558 Died)
- Filippo de Arighetti, O.F.M. (16 Dec 1558 – 1572 Died)
- Adriano Vincenzi (23 Feb 1573 – Nov 1573 Died)
- Guglielmo Rodano (16 Dec 1573 – Jul 1574 Died)
- Cesare Contardo (27 Aug 1574 – 16 Apr 1578) (Appointed Bishop of Sagone)
- Marcantonio Montefiori (16 Apr 1578 – 10 Dec 1578 Died)
- Giovanni Battista Baldi (30 Jan 1579 – 1589 Died)
- Andrea Scribano (6 Mar 1591 – 1598 Died)
- Jacques Rusconi (12 Feb 1601 – 1612 Died)
- Giuliano Castagnola (19 Nov 1612 – 21 Dec 1620 Died)
- Giovanni Mascardi (19 Apr 1621 – 1646 Died)
- Vincenzo Saporiti (3 Dec 1646 – 2 Jan 1664 Died)
- Francesco Camillo de Mari, C.R.S. (23 Jun 1664 – 13 Jul 1671 Died)
- Giovanni Geronimo Doria, C.R.S. (16 Nov 1671 – Dec 1702 Died)
- Tomaso Giustiniani, C.R.M. (22 Jul 1709 – 25 Jun 1713 Died)
- Nicolao Gaetano Aprosio, C.R. (11 Dec 1713 – 19 Dec 1732 Died)
- Giambattista Curlo (5 Mar 1733 – 26 May 1741 Resigned)
- Romualdu Massei (29 May 1741 – 2 Mar 1763 Died)
- Matthieu François Antoine Philippe Guasco, O.F.M. Obs. (6 Aug 1770 – 8 Mar 1773) (Appointed Bishop of Sagone)
- François Cittadella (15 Mar 1773 – 22 Apr 1775 Resigned)
- Dominique Maria de Santini (15 Jul 1776 – Oct 1801 Resigned)

== Books ==
- Cappelletti, Giuseppe (1861). Le chiese d'Italia Tomo decimosesto Venezia: Giuseppe Antonelli. Retrieved: 2016-10-26.
- Eubel, Conradus, ed. (1913). Hierarchia catholica, Tomus 1 (second ed.). Münster: Libreria Regensbergiana. (in Latin)
- Eubel, Conradus, ed. (1914). Hierarchia catholica, Tomus 2 (second ed.). Münster: Libreria Regensbergiana.
- Gulik, Guilelmus (1923). Eubel, Conradus (ed.). Hierarchia catholica, Tomus 3 (second ed.). Münster: Libreria Regensbergiana.
- Gams, Pius Bonifatius (1873). Series episcoporum Ecclesiae catholicae: quotquot innotuerunt a beato Petro apostolo (in Latin). Ratisbon: Typis et Sumptibus Georgii Josephi Manz.
- Gauchat, Patritius (Patrice) (1935). Hierarchia catholica IV (1592-1667). Münster: Libraria Regensbergiana.
- Pisani, Paul (1907). Répertoire biographique de l'épiscopat constitutionnel (1791-1802) (in French). Paris: A. Picard et fils.
- Ritzler, Remigius; Sefrin, Pirminus (1952). Hierarchia catholica medii et recentis aevi V (1667-1730). Patavii: Messagero di S. Antonio.
- Ritzler, Remigius; Sefrin, Pirminus (1958). Hierarchia catholica medii et recentis aevi VI (1730-1799). Patavii: Messagero di S. Antonio.
- Ughelli, Ferdinando; Coleti, Niccolò (1719). Italia sacra sive De episcopis Italiæ, et insularum adjacentium (in Latin). Vol. Tomus quartus (4). Venice: apud Sebastianum Coleti. pp. 999–1004.
- Venturini, A. (2006), "Les évêques de Corse depuis les origines avérées à la réunion de l'évêché d'Accia à celui de Mariana (591-1563)," Etudes corses no. 65 (Fevrier 2008), pp. 1–40. (in French)
