= Diocese of Anagni-Alatri =

Latin Catholic ecclesiastical jurisdiction in Italy

Diocese of Anagni-Alatri Dioecesis Anagnina-Alatrina

Catholic
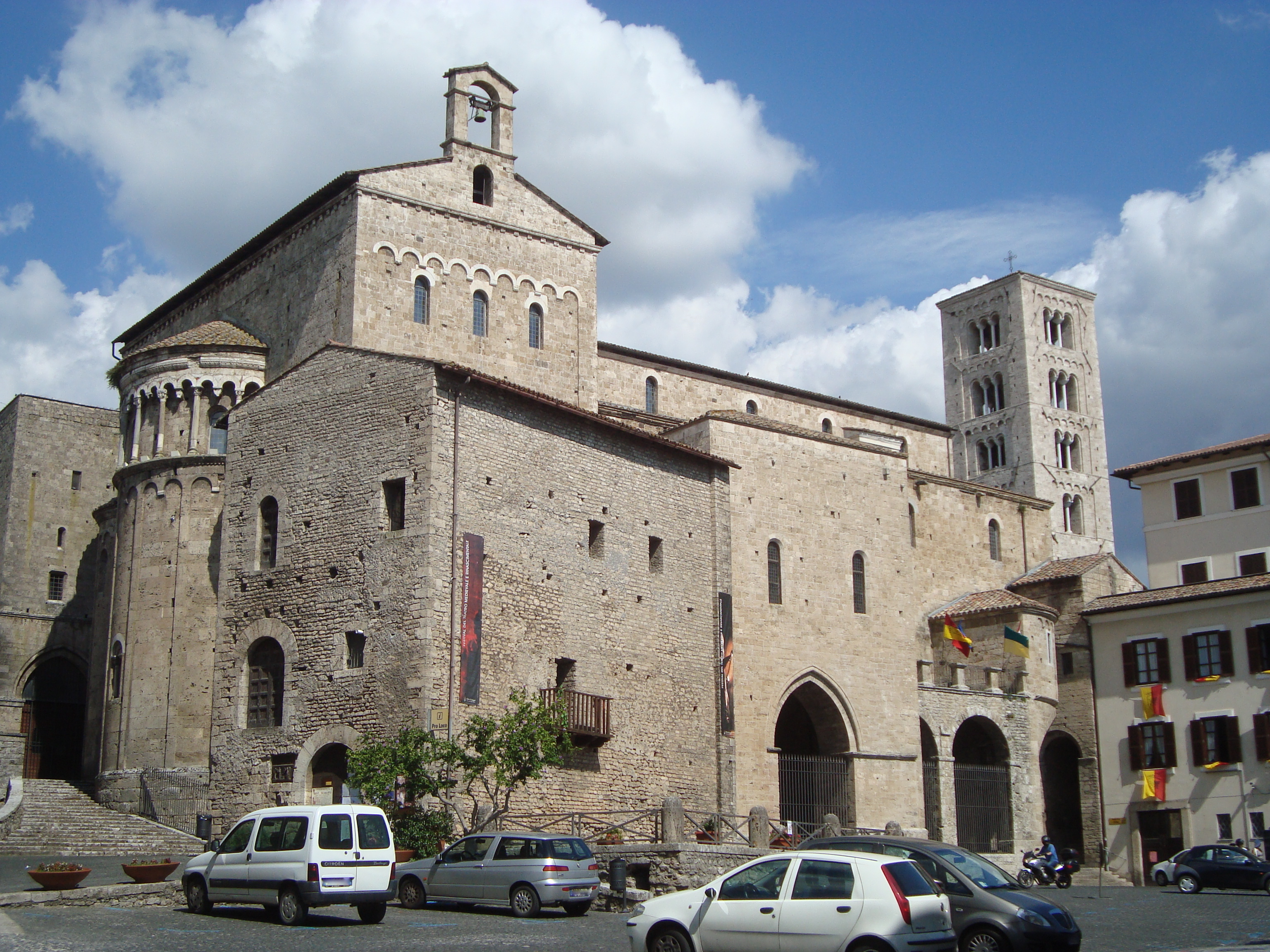
- Anagni Cathedral

Location
- Country: Italy
- Ecclesiastical province: Immediately exempt to the Holy See

Statistics
- Area: 787 km^{2} (304 sq mi)
- Population: Total; Catholics: (as of 2023); 91,204 ▲; 88,900 (est.) ▼ (97.5%)
- Parishes: 56

Information
- Denomination: Catholic Church
- Sui iuris church: Latin Church
- Rite: Roman Rite
- Established: 5th century
- Cathedral: Basilica Cattedrale di Maria SS. Annunziata (Anagni)
- Co-cathedral: Basilica Concattedrale di S. Paolo Apostolo (Alatri)
- Secular priests: 34 (diocesan) ▼11 (Religious Orders) ▼5 Permanent Deacons ▲

Current leadership
- Pope: Leo XIV
- Bishop: Santo Marcianò
- Bishops emeritus: Lorenzo Loppa

Website
- www.diocesianagnialatri.it

The Diocese of Anagni-Alatri (Latin: Dioecesis Anagnina-Alatrina) is a Latin Church ecclesiastical territory or diocese of the Catholic Church in Lazio, Italy. It has existed in its current form since 1986. In that year the Diocese of Alatri was united to the historical Diocese of Anagni. The diocese is immediately exempt to the Holy See.

== History ==
Despite the usual claims of foundation in the apostolic age, there is no evidence of Christianity in Anagni until the 4th century, and, as a bishopric, the diocese first appears in history in the fifth century. Felix, Bishop of Anagni, was present at the Lateran Synod of Pope Felix III held in 487.

In a later century the Bishopric of Anagni obtained some attention because its occupant received special consideration from the popes. Zacharias of Anagni was one of the legates of Pope Nicholas I at the Council of Constantinople in 861, to deal with the election of Photius to the patriarchate of Constantinople. Zacharias disobeyed his instructions, however, and entered into communion with the excommunicated schismatic Photius, and was therefore excommunicated himself and deposed from his bishopric of Anagni by Pope Nicholas, in his fourth Roman synod of 863.

Stephen, a native of Rome and son of a Roman priest named Joannes, became Bishop of Anagni, and was consecrated by Pope Formosus (891–896). On the death of Formosus, and after the fifteen-day reign of Boniface VI (April 896), Stephen became Pope. He summoned and presided over the notorious "Cadaver synod", which put the dead body of Pope Formosus on trial, convicted him, and ordered his body thrown into the Tiber River. Pope Stephen ruled for one year, three months, and eighteen days, and was then deposed, imprisoned, and strangled.

Four natives of Anagni, all members of the same family, became popes: Innocent III (1198-1216); Gregory IX (1227–1241); Alexander IV (1254–1261); and Boniface VIII (1294-1303). Numerous popes made Anagni their summer residence, or their refuge from Romans and emperors.

According to a local legend of Anagni, Thomas Becket in his exile from England, was received in 1169 at Anagni by the canons, and a chapel, which had once been a Mithraeum, was consecrated in his honor in the crypt of the cathedral, apparently at the request of Henry II of England.

Pope Boniface VIII was violently attacked at Anagni by Guillaume de Nogaret, the chancellor of Philippe le Bel, and Sciarra Colonna. He was so badly treated that he died two weeks later, after having fled to Rome.

=== Chapter ===
In 1244, Pope Innocent IV intervened in a jurisdictional dispute between Bishop Pandulfus and the cathedral Chapter, deciding that the bishop should not have the exclusive right to name the rectors of the city churches, but that the assent of the Chapter was required for all of the bishop's nominations.

On 28 February 1251, Pope Innocent IV wrote to Bishop Pandulfus about the staffing of the cathedral Chapter; he had found that there was only one priest, and no deacons or subdeacons, actually seeing to services, and he authorized the bishop and the Canons to appoint two canons and two priests who were willing to reside at the cathedral. A few years later, Pope Alexander IV (1254–1261) fixed the number of dignities in the Cathedral Chapter at three: the Primicerius, the Archpriest and the Vicedominus; the number of Canons was limited to twenty-four. The right to elect the Archpriest belonged to the Canons, not to the bishop. The dignity of Provost was instituted by Pope Boniface VIII (1294–1303). In 1708, the Chapter of the cathedral of S. Maria Annunziata had one dignity, the Provost, and twenty Canons. The right of the Canons to elect a bishop was usurped by Pope John XXII in 1316.

=== Diocesan synods ===
The Fourth Lateran Council (1216) decreed that provincial synods should be held annually in each ecclesiastical province, and that each diocese should hold annual diocesan synods.

A diocesan synod was an irregularly held, but important, meeting of the bishop of a diocese and his clergy. Its purpose was (1) to proclaim generally the various decrees already issued by the bishop; (2) to discuss and ratify measures on which the bishop chose to consult with his clergy; (3) to publish statutes and decrees of the diocesan synod, of the provincial synod, and of the Holy See.

A diocesan synod was held by Bishop Gaspare Viviani (1579–1605) on 4–5 March 1596.

In 1630, Bishop Giovanni Gaspare Melis (1626–1642) presided over a diocesan synod, and in 1645, Bishop Sebastiano Gentile (1642–1646) held a diocesan synod. Bishop Bernardino Masseri (1681–1695) held a diocesan synod in Anagni on 21–22 May 1685.

Bishop Giovanni Battista Bassi (1708–1736) presided over a diocesan synod, held in Anagni on 25–27 June 1713. Bishop Cirillo Antonini (1778–1789) held a diocesan synod on 22–25 October 1780.

On 1–3 September 1805, Bishop Gioacchino Tosi (1804–1815) presided at a diocesan synod in the Basilica Cathedral of S. Maria in Anagni.

== Bishops ==
=== Diocese of Anagni ===
==== to 1200 ====
...

- Felix (attested 487)

...

- Fortunatus (attested 499, 501, 502)

...
[Petrus (593) forgery]

- Pelagius (attested 595)

[Dominicus (595)]
...

- Opportunus (attested 649)

...

- Mauritius (attested 680)

...

- Gregorius (attested 721)

...

- Cesarius (attested 743)

...

- Constantinus (attested 757, 761)
- Nigortius (attested 769)

...

- Romualdus (attested 826)
- Sebastianus (before 853)
- Nicholas (attested 853)
- Zacharias (attested 860–863)
- Alboinus (Albinus) (attested 863–869)
- Zacharias (c. 872 – after 887) (second term)
- Stephanus (c. 891–896)

...

- Joannes (attested 963–967)

...

- Joannes (attested 993–997)

[Luitardus]

- Trasmundus (attested 1008)

...

- Rumaldus (11th cent.)

...

- Benedictus (attested 1026–1027)

...

- Petrus (1062–1105)
- Otto of Bamberg (1106–1112)
- Petrus
- Ojolinus
- Raone (attested 1133)

...

- Lotarius (attested 1155)

...

- Nuclerius (attested 1161)
- Asahel (attested 1179)
- Joannes (attested 1180–1185)
- Joannes (1196–1220)

==== 1200 to 1700 ====
- Joannes (1196–1220)
- Joannes (1221– ? )
- Albertus (1224–1237)
- Pandulfus (attested 1237–1255)

[Nicolaus]

- Joannes Compatre (attested 1257)
- Landulfus
- Petrus Gaetani (1276–1278)
- Petrus
- Gerardus Pigoletti (1289–1290)
- Petrus, O.Cist. (1290–1295)
- Petrus Torrita (1295–1299)
- Leonardus (1299–1320)
- Petrus Ferri (1320–1327)
- Alamannus de Galgano (1327–1330)
- Giovanni Pagnotta, O.S.A. (5 Nov 1330 – Mar 1341 Died)
- Joannes de Scrofanis (1342–1348)
- Petrus de Grassinis (1348–1363)
- Joannes Jacobi Modeli (1363–1382) Avignon Obedience
- Thomas Morganti, O.Cist. (1382–1398) Roman Obedience
- Jacobus de Trebis, O.E.S.A. (1399–1401)
- Angelo Afflitti (1401–1418)
- Angelotto Fosco (1418–1426)

Sede vacante (1426–1429)

Oddo Potii de Variis (1426–1429) Apostolic Administrator

- Francesco da Genazzano (1429–1451)
- Salvatore da Genazzano (1451– ? )
- Giovanni da Cremona (1478)
- Francesco Muscambruni (1484–1502?)
- Ferdinando di Lanciano (1502–1515)
- Giacomo Bongalli (1515–1516)
- Cardinal Francesco Soderini (1517–1523 Resigned) Administrator
- Corrado Cerbaria (7 Jun 1525 – 1534 Died)
- Cardinal Gianvincenzo Carafa (1534–1541 Resigned) Administrator
- Cardinal Pedro Sarmiento (1541 Resigned) Administrator
- Miguel Torcella (6 Apr 1541 – 1572 Died)
- Benedetto Lomellini (17 Mar 1572 – 24 Jul 1579 Died)
- Gaspare Viviani (3 Aug 1579 – 25 Jan 1605 Died)
- Vittorio Guarini (1605–1607)
- Antonio Seneca (1607–1626)
- Gian Gaspare Melis (16 Sep 1626 – Jan 1642 Died)
- Sebastiano Gentili (24 Mar 1642 – 3 Dec 1646 Resigned)
- Pier Francesco Filonardi (3 Dec 1646 – 1662 Died)
- Gian Lorenzo Castiglioni (13 Mar 1662 –1680)
- Bernardino Masseri (23 Jun 1681 – Aug 1695 Died)

==== from 1700 to 1987 ====
- Pietro Paolo Gerardi (21 May 1696 – 31 May 1708 Died)
- Giovanni Battista Bassi (3 Oct 1708 – 19 Dec 1736 Died)

Bartolomeo de Vulsinio, O.F.M.Observ. (1729–1736)

- Giovanni Antonio Bacchetoni (1737–1749)
- Domenico Monti (19 Jan 1750 –1766
- Giovanni Battista Filipponi Tenderini (14 Apr 1766 – 11 Sep 1778 Resigned)
- Cirillo Antonini (28 Sep 1778 – 20 Jan 1789 Died)
- Giovanni Devoti (30 Mar 1789 – 26 Mar 1804 Resigned)
- Gioacchino Tosi (26 Mar 1804 – 21 Mar 1815 Resigned)

Sede vacante (1815–1838)

Luca Amici, Bishop of Ferentino (1815) Administrator
Francesco Maria Biordi, titular Bishop of Dulma (1816) Administrator
Giuseppe Maria Lais, titular Bishop of Hippo (1817-1834) Administrator
Pier Francesco Muccioli, O.F.M.Conv., titular Bishop of Messene (1834–1838) Administrator

- Vincenzo Annovazzi (15 Feb 1838 – 12 Sep 1846 Resigned)
- Pietro Paolo Trucchi, C.M. (1846–1857)
- Clemente Pagliaro (21 Dec 1857 – 9 Mar 1875)
- Domenico Pietromarchi (31 Mar 1875 – 7 Feb 1894)
- Antonino Sardi (18 May 1894 – 8 Jul 1912 Resigned)
- Silvio Gasperini (2 Dec 1912 – 24 Oct 1923)
- Luigi Mazzini (9 Nov 1923 – 24 Jun 1926 Resigned)
- Gaudenzio Manuelli (8 Jul 1927 –1931)
- Attilio Adinolfi (5 May 1931 – 1 Sep 1945)
- Giovanni Battista Piasentini, C.S.Ch. (18 Feb 1946 –1952)
- Enrico Romolo Compagnone, O.C.D. (10 Mar 1953 –1972)
- Vittorio Ottaviani (30 Nov 1972 –1973)
- Umberto Florenzani (21 Dec 1973 – 23 Feb 1987 Died)

=== Diocese of Anagni-Alatri ===
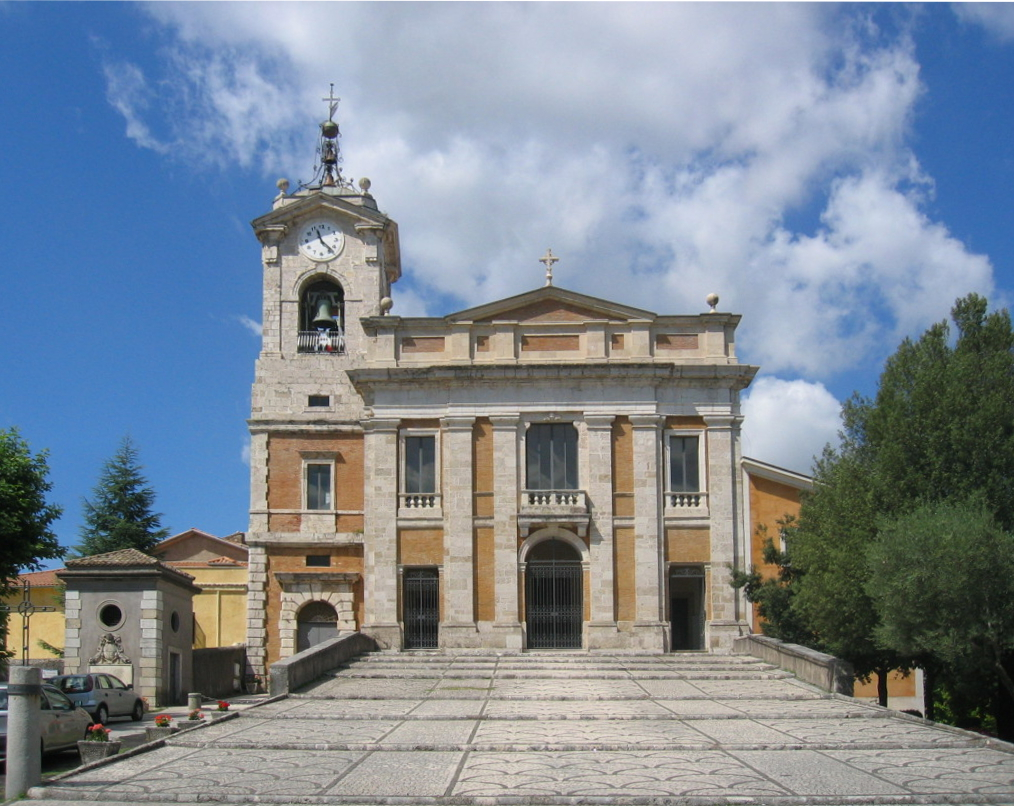
Co-cathedral in Alatri

30 September 1986 United with the Diocese of Alatri

- Luigi Belloli (7 December 1987 – 6 March 1999 Retired)
- Francesco Lambiasi (6 March 1999 – 28 June 2002 Resigned)
- Lorenzo Loppa (28 June 2002 – 10 November 2022 Retired)
- Ambrogio Spreafico (10 November 2022 – 1 July 2025 Retired)
- Santo Marcianò (1 July 2025 – Present)

== Sources ==
=== Sources for lists of bishops ===
- Gams, Pius Bonifatius (1873). Series episcoporum Ecclesiae catholicae: quotquot innotuerunt a beato Petro apostolo (in Latin). Ratisbon: Typis et Sumptibus Georgii Josephi Manz. pp. 663–664.
- Eubel, Conradus, ed. (1913). Hierarchia catholica (in Latin). Vol. 1 (Tomus I) (second ed.). Münster: Libreria Regensbergiana.
- Eubel, Conradus, ed. (1914). Hierarchia catholica (in Latin). Vol. 2 (Tomus II) (second ed.). Münster: Libreria Regensbergiana.
- Eubel, Conradus; Gulik, Guilelmus, eds. (1923). Hierarchia catholica (in Latin). Vol. 3 (Tomus III) (second ed.). Münster: Libreria Regensbergiana.
- Gauchat, Patritius (Patrice) (1935). Hierarchia catholica (in Latin). Vol. 4 (Tomus IV) (1592-1667). Münster: Libraria Regensbergiana.
- Ritzler, Remigius; Sefrin, Pirminus (1952). Hierarchia catholica medii et recentis aevi V (1667-1730) (in Latin). Patavii: Messagero di S. Antonio.
- Ritzler, Remigius; Sefrin, Pirminus (1958). Hierarchia catholica medii et recentis aevi (in Latin). Vol. Tomus VI (1730-1799). Patavii: Messagero di S. Antonio.
- Ritzler, Remigius; Sefrin, Pirminus (1968). Hierarchia Catholica medii et recentioris aevi sive summorum pontificum, S. R. E. cardinalium, ecclesiarum antistitum series... A pontificatu Pii PP. VII (1800) usque ad pontificatum Gregorii PP. XVI (1846) (in Latin). Vol. VII. Monasterii: Libr. Regensburgiana.
- Remigius Ritzler; Pirminus Sefrin (1978). Hierarchia catholica Medii et recentioris aevi... A Pontificatu PII PP. IX (1846) usque ad Pontificatum Leonis PP. XIII (1903) (in Latin). Vol. VIII. Il Messaggero di S. Antonio.
- Pięta, Zenon (2002). Hierarchia catholica medii et recentioris aevi... A pontificatu Pii PP. X (1903) usque ad pontificatum Benedictii PP. XV (1922) (in Latin). Vol. IX. Padua: Messagero di San Antonio. ISBN 978-88-250-1000-8.

=== Studies ===
- Cappelletti, Giuseppe (1847). Le chiese d'Italia (in Italian). Vol. sesto (6). Venezia: G. Antonelli. pp. 271–385.
- Kehr, Paulus Fridolinus (1907). Italia pontificia: Latium (in Latin). Vol. II. Berlin: Apud Weidmannos. pp. 135–145.
- Lanzoni, Francesco (1927). Le diocesi d'Italia dalle origini al principio del secolo VII (an. 604). Faenza: F. Lega, pp. 166–167. (in Italian)
- Schwartz, Gerhard (1907). Die Besetzung der Bistümer Reichsitaliens unter den sächsischen und salischen Kaisern: mit den Listen der Bischöfe, 951-1122. Leipzig: B.G. Teubner. pp. 268–269.(in German)
- Ughelli, Ferdinando; Coleti, Niccolò (1717). Italia sacra, sive De Episcopis Italiae (in Latin). Vol. Tomus primus (secunda ed.). Venice: apud Sebastianum Coleti. pp. 305–324.
