= Roman Catholic Diocese of Umbriatico =

Roman Catholic diocese

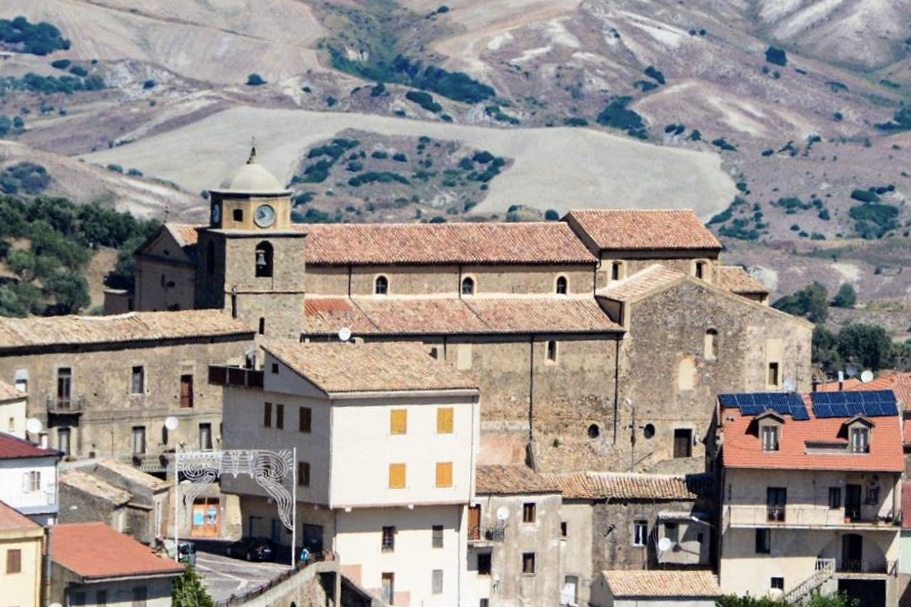
The former Cathedral of San Donato in Umbriatico (Province of Crotone)

The Diocese of Umbriatico (also Diocese of Umbriaticum) (Latin: Dioecesis Umbriaticensis) was a Roman Catholic diocese located in the town of Umbriatico in the province of Crotone in southern Italian region of Calabria. In 1818, it was suppressed with the bull De utiliori of Pope Pius VII, and incorporated in the diocese of Cariati.

== Ordinaries ==
=== Diocese of Umbriatico ===
Erected: 1030
Latin Name: Umbriaticensis
Metropolitan: Archdiocese of Santa Severina

- Nicola de Martino (3 Oct 1435 – 17 Oct 1442 Appointed, Archbishop of Rossano)
- Francesco Cechi (1443 – 1448)
- Nicola de Guzolo (1448 – 1475)
- Francesco de Caprusacci (3 Mar 1475 – 1494 Died)
- Antonio Guerra (bishop) (4 Feb 1495 – 4 Aug 1500 Died)
- Matteo de Senis (7 Aug 1500 – 1507 Died)
- Marco (1507–1516 Resigned)

- Father Didier Gilionis, bishop-elect (17 Sep 1516 – 1520 never took effect)
- Niccolò Fieschi, Administrator (1517 – 1520 Resigned)

- Andrea della Valle (20 Mar 1521 – 10 Sep 1522 Resigned)
- Giovanni Matteo Lucifero (10 Sep 1522 – 14 Nov 1524, Bishop of Crotone)
- Giovanni Piccolomini (14 Nov 1524 – 20 Mar 1531 Resigned)
- Giacomo Antonio Lucifero (20 Mar 1531 – 1548 Died)
- Cesare Foggia (7 May 1548 – 1567 Died)
- Pietro Bordone (10 Mar 1567 – 1578 Died)
- Vincenzo Ferrari (2 Jun 1578 – 1579 Died)
- Emiliano Bombini (16 Mar 1579 – 1592 Died)
- Alessandro Filarete (12 Aug 1592 – 1608 Died)
- Paolo Emilio Sammarco (16 Feb 1609 – 1610 Died)
- Pietro Bastoni (24 Jan 1611 – 1622 Died)
- Benedetto Baaz (Vaez) (2 May 1622 – 1631 Died)
- Antonio Ricciulli (seniore) (16 Feb 1632 – 7 Feb 1639, Bishop of Caserta)
- Bartolomeo Cresconi (28 Mar 1639 – 6 May 1647, Bishop of Caserta)
- Ottavio Poderico (27 May 1647 – 1650 Died)
- Domenico Blanditi (22 Aug 1650 – 1651 Died)
- Tommaso Tomassoni, O.P. (8 Jan 1652 – Oct 1654 Died)
- Giuseppe de Rossi, O.F.M. Conv. (9 Jul 1655 – 1659 Died)
- Antonio Ricciulli (iuniore) (9 Jun 1659 – Aug 1660 Died)
- Vitaliano Marescano (14 Mar 1661 – 18 Mar 1667 Died)
- Agostino De Angelis, C.R.S. (22 Aug 1667 – Apr 1681 Died)
- Giovanni Battista Ponzi (20 Apr 1682 – Mar 1689 Died)
- Giuseppe Ponzi (11 Jan 1690 – Oct 1692 Died)
- Michael Cantelmi, O. Carm. (9 Mar 1693 – 17 Jun 1696 Died)
- Bartolomeo Olivieri (17 Dec 1696 – Aug 1708 Died)
- Antonio Gagliani, O.F.M. Conv. (21 Jan 1715 – Aug 1715 Died)
- Francesco Maria Loyero (20 Jan 1721 – 6 Aug 1731, Bishop of Nicastro)
- Filippo de Amato (3 Sep 1731 – 3 Aug 1732 Died)
- Domenico Antonio Peronaci (19 Dec 1732 – 5 Feb 1775 Died)
- Tommaso Maria Francone, C.R. (17 Jul 1775 – 23 Jun 1777, Archbishop of Manfredonia)
- Nicolas Notariis (28 Jul 1777 – 20 Jul 1778, Bishop of Squillace)
- Zacharias Coccopalmieri (1 Mar 1779 – 18 Nov 1784 Died)
- Vincenzo Maria Castro (27 Feb 1792 Confirmed – 18 Dec 1797 Confirmed, Bishop of Castellaneta)
- Isidoro Leggio, C.SS.R. (18 Dec 1797 Confirmed – 18 Jul 1801 Died)

1818: Suppressed to the diocese of Cariati.
