= Theodoli =

Theodoli is a surname of Italian origin. Notable people with the surname include:

- Augusto Theodoli (1819–1892), Italian Catholic prelate
- Gerolamo Theodoli (1677–1766), Italian nobleman and architect
- Giacomo Theodoli (1594–1643), Italian Roman Catholic prelate
- Mario Theodoli (1601–1650), Italian Catholic cardinal

== See also ==
- Lily Conrad, Marchesa Theodoli (1850–1908), American-Italian novelist
- Theodoli Chapel, a chapel in the Basilica of Santa Maria del Popolo, Rome
- Palazzo Theodoli-Bianchelli, a building in Rome, Italy
