= Diocese of Tursi-Lagonegro =

Roman Catholic diocese in Italy

Coordinates: 40.2500°N 16.4667°E

Diocese of Tursi-Lagonegro Dioecesis Tursiensis-Lacunerulonensis

Catholic
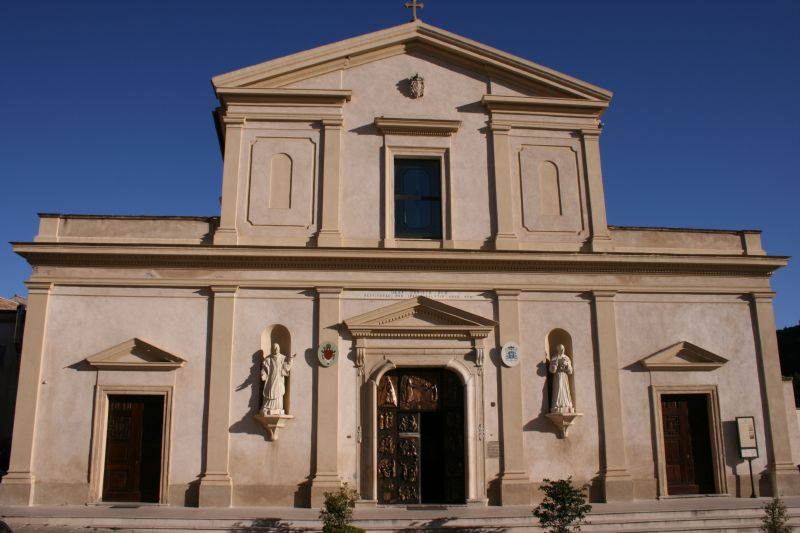
- Tursi Cathedral

Location
- Country: Italy
- Ecclesiastical province: Potenza-Muro Lucano-Marsico Nuovo
- Metropolitan: Salvatore Ligorio

Statistics
- Area: 2,509 km^{2} (969 sq mi)
- Population: Total; Catholics: (as of 2023); 124,690 (est.) ▼; 123,700 (guess) ▼
- Parishes: 72

Information
- Denomination: Catholic Church
- Rite: Roman Rite
- Established: 11th century
- Cathedral: Cattedrale di S. Maria Assunta
- Co-cathedral: Concattedrale S. Nicola di Bari
- Secular priests: 71 (diocesan) ▼4 (religious orders); 6 Permanent Deacons

Current leadership
- Pope: Leo XIV
- Bishop: Vincenzo Carmine Orofino

Website
- www.diocesitursi.it

The Diocese of Tursi-Lagonegro (Latin: Dioecesis Tursiensis-Lacunerulonensis) is a Latin diocese of the Catholic Church in Basilicata, southern Italy. It is a suffragan of the Archdiocese of Potenza-Muro Lucano-Marsico Nuovo.

== History ==
The diocese of Tursi is first attested as a Greek diocese. In the privilege granted by Polyeuktos, the Patriarch of Constantinople to the Metropolitan of Otranto in 968, the Metropolitan is granted the right to consecrate the bishops of Acerenza, Tursi, Gravina, Matera, and Tricarico.

The first bishop to call himself Bishop of Anglona was Petrus (1110). Simeon, a bishop of Anglona, was present at the ceremony of donation of some fields, made by Hugo di Chiaromonte and his wife Ginarga to the Basilian monastery of Sts. Elias and Anastasius.

On 16 June 1102 (or 1106, or 1108), Pope Paschal II confirmed the privileges of the metropolitan archbishop of Acerenza, which included the suffragan dioceses of Venosa, Gravina, Tricarico, Tursi, and Potenza. The privilege was repeated by Pope Eugenius III on 1 April 1151; by Pope Alexander III on 7 September 1179; and by Pope Innocent III on 10 December 1201. In October 1167, King William II of Sicily granted the castle of Nucara to Bishop Guilelmus of Anglona, for the good of his soul. In July 1181, Bishop Roboan of Anglona relinquished his rights over the abbey of Ss. Elias and Anastasius of Carbone to the archbishop of Monreale.

Following the death of the Emperor Frederick II in 1250, the struggle for the succession between Conrad and Manfred involved not only the papacy, but also most of the vassals of the Empire in south Italy. Pope Innocent IV (Fieschi) excommunicated Manfred in July 1254. One of the leaders of the opposition to Manfred, and a papal supporter, was Borello, the lord of Anglona. In October 1254, five months after the death of Conrad, Manfred killed Borello. Manfred fled to Lucera where he was favorably received, and assumed control over the town and fortress.

Anglona was destroyed in the days of Queen Johanna of Naples.

The name of the diocese was officially changed from Diocese of Anglona to Diocese of Anglona-Tursi in 1545 or 1546, Tursi being a town in the diocese of Anglona.

=== Reorganization of 1976 ===
On 8 September 1976, the diocese of Diano-Policastro lost seven towns, including Lagonegro, when the Diocese of Tursi-Lagonegro was established. The church of S. Nicholas of Bari in Lagonegro was promoted to the status of co-cathedral. The name (titulus) of "Anglona" was suppressed from the diocesan name, but the name was retained and placed among the names of future titular sees.

Following the Second Vatican Council, and in accordance with the norms laid out in the council's decree, Christus Dominus chapter 40, Pope Paul VI ordered a reorganization of the ecclesiastical provinces in southern Italy by the bull Quo aptius of 21 August 1976. The ecclesiastical provinces of Acerenza and of Matera were abolished, and a new province, that of Potenza, was created. On 12 September 1976, Pope Paul continued the reorganization by dissolving the Episcopal Conference of Benevento and of Lucana-Salernitana. He created a new Episcopal Conference in the area of Basilicata, to be called "Apulia", and which included the dioceses of Potenza, Marsico Nuovo and Venosa; Acerenza and Tricarico; Melphi, Rapolla and Venosa; Tursi-Lagonegro; and Materana and Montepeloso. The diocese of Tursi-Lagonegro was a suffragan of the archdiocese of Potenza-Marsico Nuovo-Venosa.

=== Chapter and Cathedral ===
In 1702, both the bishop and the Chapter were living in Tursi. The Cathedral of the Annunciation in Tursi was administered by a Chapter consisting of three dignities (the Archdeacon, the Archpriest, and the Dean) and ten canons. In 1763, there were three dignities and fourteen canons. In 1870, the cathedral was administered by a Chapter, consisting of three dignities and eleven canons.

== Bishops ==
=== Diocese of Anglona ===
Erected: 11th Century
Latin Name: Anglonensis
Metropolitan: Archdiocese of Acerenza e Matera

...

- Leon
- Michael (attested 1050)
- Engelbert (attested 1065 – 1068)
- Simeon (attested 1074)

...

- Petrus (attested 1110)
- Johannes (attested 1121 – 1146)

...

- Riccardus (attested 1172)
- Roboan (attested 1179 – 1181)

...
Nicolaus (1219) Bishop-elect

- Petrus de Postitio (1219?)
- [Anonymous] (attested 1221)
- Robertus (attested 1241)

...
Sede vacante (1252–1253)

- Deodatus de Squillace, O.M. (attested 1253 – 1255)
- Joannes de Montefuscolo (1275? – 1259)
- Leonardus, O.Cist. (attested 1269 – 1274)
- Gualterius ( ? – 1299)
- Marcus
- Silvester
- Franciscus della Mara
- Guillelmus (1330 – 1332)
- Johannes de Tricarico (1332 – 1344?)
- Riccardus
- Philippus (1363 – 1364)
- Philippus (1364 – ? )

Zotta Avignon Obedience

- Roger Marescalchi (1392 – 1400) Avignon Obedience
- Jacobus (1399–1400) Roman Obedience
- Roger Marescalchi (1400 – 1418)
- Giovanni Caracciolo (1418 – 1439)
- Jacobus de Tussi (1439 – 1466)
- Ludovicus Fenollet (1466 – 1472)
- Jacobus Chiasconi (1472 –1507 resigned)
- Fabricius de Capua (1507 – 1510)
- Giovanni Antonio Scotti (1510 – 1528)
- Gianvincenzo Carafa (31 Aug 1528 – 1536 Resigned) Administrator
- Oliviero Carafa (1536 − 1542)

Cardinal Guido Ascanio Sforza (1542) Administrator

- Bernardino Elvino (20 Dec 1542 – 11 Jul 1548)

=== Diocese of Anglona-Tursi ===
Name Changed: 8 August 1545
Latin Name: Anglonensis-Tursiensis
Metropolitan: Archdiocese of Matera

==== to 1700 ====
- Bernardino Elvino (8 August 1545/1546 – 1548)
- Giulio de Grandis (27 Jul 1548 – 1560 Resigned)
- Giovanni Paolo Amanio (5 Apr 1560 – 1580)
- Nicolò Grana (1580 – 1595)
- Ascanio Giocovazzi (10 Apr 1595 – 1609 Resigned)
- Bernardo Giustiniano (15 Jun 1609 – 1616 Died)
- Innico Siscara (19 Dec 1616 – 1619 Died)
- Alfonso Giglioli (17 Jun 1619 – 24 Mar 1630 Died)
- Giovanni Battista Deti (9 Sep 1630 – Aug 1631 Died)
- Alessandro Deti (26 Apr 1632 – Jan 1637 Died)
- Marco Antonio Coccini (15 Jan 1638 – 1646)
- Flavio Galletti, O.S.B. (16 Jul 1646 – 26 Nov 1653)
- Francesco Antonio De Luca (1 Jun 1654 – 1667)
- Matteo Cosentino (3 Oct 1667 – 12 Apr 1702 Died)

==== 1700 to 1900 ====
- Domenico Sabbatini (20 Nov 1702 – Sep 1721)
- Ettore del Quarto (1 Dec 1721 – 1734)
- Guilio Capece Scondito (26 Jan 1735 – 30 Oct 1762)
- Giovanni Battista Pignatelli (24 Jan 1763 – 24 Jul 1778 Resigned)
- Salvatore Vecchioni, C.O. (14 Dec 1778 – 28 Oct 1818 Died)
- Arcangelo Gabriele Cela (1819 – 1822)
- Giuseppe Saverio Poli (1824 – 1836 Resigned)
- Antonio Cinque (1837 –1841)
- Gaetano Tigani (22 Jul 1842 Confirmed – 2 Sep 1847)
- Gennaro Acciardi (20 Apr 1849 – 1883)
- Rocco Leonasi (1883 – 1883)
- Serafino Angelini (12 Jun 1893 – 30 Nov 1896 Appointed, Bishop of Avellino)
- Carmelo Pujia (9 Jan 1898 – 30 Oct 1905 Appointed, Archbishop of Santa Severina)

==== since 1900 ====
- Ildefonso Vincenzo Pisani, C.R.L. (10 Feb 1908 – 3 Jan 1912 Resigned)
- Giovanni Pulvirenti (27 Nov 1911 – 19 Aug 1922 Appointed, Bishop of Cefalù)
- Ludovico Cattaneo, O.Ss.C.A. (15 Sep 1923 – 6 Jul 1928 Appointed, Bishop of Ascoli Piceno)
- Domenico Petroni (29 Jul 1930 – 1 Apr 1935 Appointed, Bishop of Melfi e Rapolla)
- Lorenzo Giacomo Inglese, O.F.M. Cap. (5 May 1935 – 12 Sep 1945 Resigned)
- Pasquale Quaremba (10 Mar 1947 – 20 Jun 1956 Appointed, Bishop of Gallipoli)
- Secundo Tagliabue (25 Jan 1957 – 22 Aug 1970 Resigned)
- Dino Tomassini (23 Aug 1970 – 12 Dec 1974 Appointed, Bishop of Assisi)
- Vincenzo Franco (12 Dec 1974 – 27 Jan 1981 Appointed, Archbishop of Otranto)

=== Diocese of Tursi-Lagonegro ===
Name Changed: 8 September 1976
Latin Name: Tursiensis-Lacunerulonensis
Metropolitan: Archdiocese of Potenza-Muro Lucano-Marsico Nuovo

- Gerardo Pierro (1981 – 1987)
- Rocco Talucci (1988 – 2000)
- Francescantonio Nolè, O.F.M. Conv. (2000 – 2015)
- Vincenzo Carmine Orofino (since 28 April 2016)

== See also ==
- List of Catholic dioceses in Italy
- History of Tursi

== Bibliography ==
=== Episcopal lists ===
- Eubel, Conradus, ed. (1913). Hierarchia catholica (in Latin). Vol. I (second ed.). Münster: Libreria Regensbergiana.
- Eubel, Conradus, ed. (1914). Hierarchia catholica (in Latin). Vol. II (second ed.). Münster: Libreria Regensbergiana.
- Eubel, Conradus; Gulik, Guilelmus (1923). Hierarchia catholica (in Latin). Vol. III (second ed.). Münster: Libreria Regensbergiana.
- Gams, Pius Bonifatius (1873). Series episcoporum Ecclesiae catholicae: quotquot innotuerunt a beato Petro apostolo (in Latin). Ratisbon: Typis et Sumptibus Georgii Josephi Manz. pp. 852–853.
- Gauchat, Patritius (Patrice) (1935). Hierarchia catholica (in Latin). Vol. IV (1592-1667). Münster: Libraria Regensbergiana.
- Ritzler, Remigius; Sefrin, Pirminus (1952). Hierarchia catholica medii et recentis aevi (in Latin). Vol. V (1667-1730). Patavii: Messagero di S. Antonio.
- Ritzler, Remigius; Sefrin, Pirminus (1958). Hierarchia catholica medii et recentis aevi (in Latin). Vol. VI (1730-1799). Patavii: Messagero di S. Antonio.

=== Studies ===
- Cappelletti, Giuseppe (1870). Le chiese d'Italia: dalla loro origine sino ai nostri giorni (in Italian). Vol. vigesimo (20). Venezia: G. Antonelli. pp. 453–465.
- D'Avino, Vincenzo (1848). Cenni storici sulle chiese arcivescovili, vescovili, e prelatizie (nulluis) del Regno delle Due Sicilie (in Italian). Napoli: Ranucci. pp. 719-727. [article written by Nicola de Salvo, Archdeacon]
- Falkenhausen, V. von (1996). "La diocesi di Tursi-Anglona in epoca normanno-sveva: terra d'incontro tra Greci e Latini." (in Italian). In: Fonseca, C.D. and Pace, V. (edd.) Santa Maria di Anglona. Galatina: Congedo Editore. Pp. 27-36.
- Fraikin, J. (1924), "Anglona–Tursi," (in French), in: Alfred Baudrillart (ed.), Dictionnaire d'histoire et de géographie ecclésiastiques, Volume 3 (Paris: Letouzey), pp. 231-238.
- Gams, Pius Bonifatius (1873). Series episcoporum Ecclesiae catholicae: quotquot innotuerunt a beato Petro apostolo (in Latin). Ratisbon: Typis et Sumptibus Georgii Josephi Manz. p. 850.
- Kamp, Norbert (1975). Kirche und Monarchie im staufischen Königreich Sizilien: I. Prosopographische Grundlegung, Bistumer und Bistümer und Bischöfe des Konigreichs 1194–1266: 2. Apulien und Calabrien München: Wilhelm Fink 1975.
- Kehr, Paulus Fridolin (1962). Italia pontificia. Regesta pontificum Romanorum. Vol. IX: Samnia – Apulia – Lucania. Berlin: Weidmann. (in Latin). pp. 468-471.
- Loud, G.A. (2007). The Latin Church in Norman Italy. Cambridge University Press, 2007.
- Mattei-Cerasoli, L. (1918), "Di alcuni vescovi poco noti," (in Italian), in: Archivio storico per le provincie Napolitane XLIII (n.s. IV 1918), pp. 363–382.
- Ughelli, Ferdinando; Coleti, NIccolo (1721). Italia sacra sive De episcopis Italiæ, et insularum adjacentium (in Latin). Vol. Tomus septimus (7). Venice: apud Sebastianum Coleti. pp. 68–114.
