= Marco Antonio Coccini =

Italian Roman Catholic prelate

Most Reverend Marco Antonio Coccini
- Bishop of Imola
- Church: Catholic Church
- Diocese: Diocese of Imola
- In office: 1646–1652
- Predecessor: Mario Theodoli
- Successor: Fabio Chigi
- Previous post: Bishop of Anglona-Tursi (1638–1646)

Orders
- Consecration: 24 Jan 1638 by Marcello Lante della Rovere

Personal details
- Born: 1587 Rome, Italy
- Died: 1652 (age 65)

Marco Antonio Coccini (1587–1652) was a Roman Catholic prelate who served as Bishop of Imola (1646–1652) and Bishop of Anglona-Tursi (1638–1646).

== Biography ==
Marco Antonio Coccini was born in Rome, Italy in 1587. On 15 Jan 1638, he was appointed during the papacy of Pope Urban VIII as Bishop of Anglona-Tursi. On 24 Jan 1638, he was consecrated bishop by Marcello Lante della Rovere, Cardinal-Bishop of Frascati, with Giovanni Battista Altieri (seniore), Bishop Emeritus of Camerino, serving as co-consecrator. On 19 Feb 1646, he was appointed during the papacy of Pope Innocent X as Bishop of Imola. He served as Bishop of Imola until his death in 1652.

== Episcopal succession ==
While bishop, he was the principal co-consecrator of:

- Jacobus Philippus Tomasini, Bishop of Novigrad (1642);
- Papirio Silvestri, Bishop of Macerata e Tolentino (1642); and
- Jacques Lebret, Bishop of Toul (1645).

== External links and additional sources ==
- Cheney, David M. "Diocese of Tursi-Lagonegro". Catholic-Hierarchy.org. (for Chronology of Bishops) ^{[self-published]}
- Chow, Gabriel. "Diocese of Tursi-Lagonegro (Italy)". GCatholic.org. (for Chronology of Bishops) ^{[self-published]}
- Cheney, David M. "Diocese of Imola". Catholic-Hierarchy.org. (for Chronology of Bishops) ^{[self-published]}
- Chow, Gabriel. "Diocese of Imola (Italy)". GCatholic.org. (for Chronology of Bishops) ^{[self-published]}

Catholic Church titles
| Preceded by Alessandro Deti | Bishop of Anglona-Tursi; 1638–1646 | Succeeded by Flavio Galletti |
| Preceded by Mario Theodoli | Bishop of Imola; 1646–1652 | Succeeded by Fabio Chigi |
