= Mario Theodoli =

Catholic cardinal

- Cardinal-Priest of Santa Maria del Popolo
- Church: Catholic Church
- See: Santa Maria del Popolo
- In office: 28 January 1649 – 27 June 1650
- Predecessor: Lelio Falconieri
- Successor: Fabio Chigi
- Previous posts: Cardinal-Priest of Sant’Alessio (1643-1649); Bishop of Imola (1644-1646)

Orders
- Consecration: 27 December 1644 by Ciriaco Rocci
- Created cardinal: 13 July 1643 by Pope Urban VIII

Personal details
- Born: 1601 Rome, Papal States
- Died: 27 June 1650 (aged 48–49) Rome, Papal States

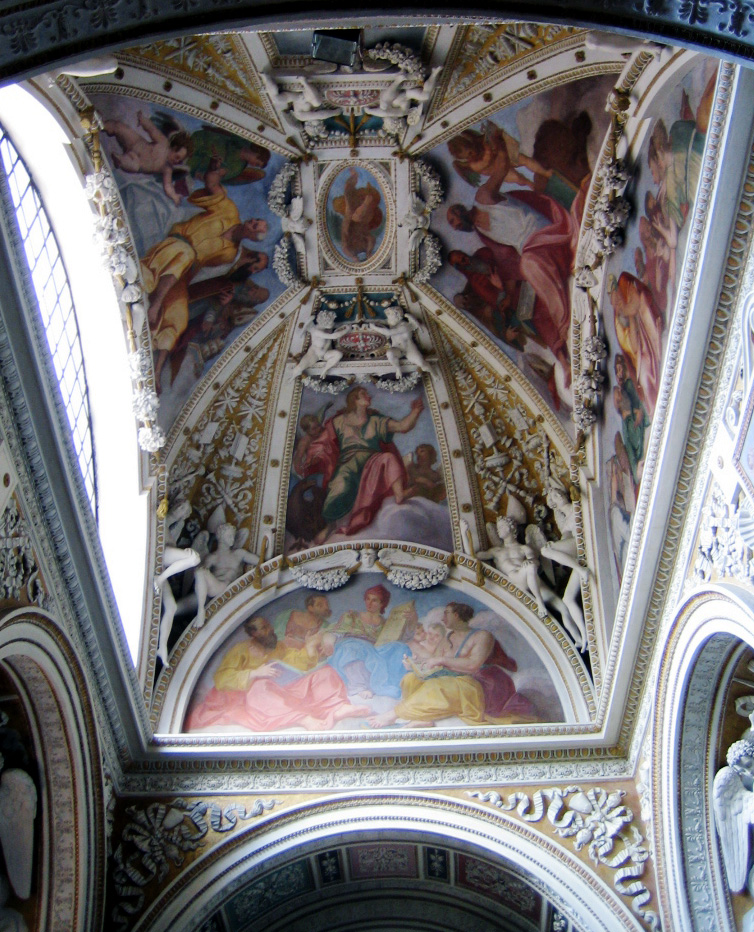
The roof of the Theodoli chapel in Santa Maria del Popolo with the frescoes by Giulio Mazzoni.

Mario Theodoli (1601 – 27 June 1650) was an Italian Catholic Cardinal.

== Biography ==
Theodoli was born 1601 in Rome, the son of Teodolo Theodoli, Marquis of San Vito, and his wife Flavia Fani. He was an ancestor of Cardinal Augusto Theodoli and a relative of Gerolamo Theodoli. At a very young age he studied law and entered the service of the Church.

He was appointed Referendary of the Tribunals of the Apostolic Signatura of Justice and of Grace and proved himself a capable administrator. He was named Governor in a succession of comunes and towns including: Terni (1626), Cesena (1627–1628), Orvieto (1628–1629), Camerino (1630), Ancona (1631–1633), and Viterbo (1633–1634).

In 1638, he bought, as was the custom at the time, a clericate in the Apostolic Chamber and in 1642 he was appointed Protonotary apostolic participantium and ordinary judge of the Roman Curia.

He was elevated to cardinal by Pope Urban VIII in 1643 and was made Cardinal-Priest at the Basilica of Santi Bonifacio e Alessio that same year. Pope Urban died in 1644 and Theodoli participated in the Papal conclave of 1644 which elected Pope Innocent X. In the absence of Cardinal Alessandro Bichi, Theodoli was appointed Minister of France before the Holy See.

Theodoli was elected Bishop of Imola in 1644 and was consecrated by Cardinal Ciriaco Rocci, Cardinal-Priest of San Salvatore in Lauro, with Alfonso Gonzaga, Titular Archbishop of Rhodus and Giacomo Theodoli, Bishop of Forlì, serving as co-consecrators. he resigned the government of the diocese because of ill health in 1646 and was transferred to the Church of Santa Maria del Popolo which housed the Theodoli family chapel. He died on 27 June 1650.

While bishop, he was the principal consecrator of Hyacinthe Serroni, Bishop of Orange (1647).

Catholic Church titles
Preceded by Giovanni Francesco Guidi di Bagno	Cardinal-Priest of Sant'Alessio; 1643–1649	Succeeded by Luigi Omodei (seniore)
Preceded by Ferdinando Millini	Bishop of Imola; 1644–1646	Succeeded by Marco Antonio Coccini
Preceded by Lelio Falconieri	Cardinal-Priest of Santa Maria del Popolo; 1649–1650	Succeeded by Fabio Chigi
