= Vitellozzo Vitelli (cardinal) =

Italian cardinal

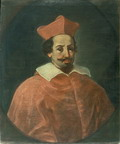
Cardinal Vitellozzo vitelli 1560.jpg

Vitellozzo Vitelli (1531 – 19 November 1568) was an Italian cardinal of the Roman Catholic Church.

== Life ==
Vitelli was born in 1531 in Città di Castello, in the Papal States, of Captain Alessandro Vitellozzi, signore of Amatrice, and Angela di Troilo Rossi, and educated at the University of Padua.

He was ordained a cleric of Città di Castello and appointed bishop there on 20 March 1554, an office he would resign in 1560.

He went to Rome in February 1556 and was created cardinal deacon 15 March 1557, receiving the deaconry of Ss. Sergio e Bacco on 24 March. He opted for the deaconry of S. Maria in Portico Octaviae in March 1559 and that of Santa Maria in Via Lata in November 1564.

He held numerous administrative posts and participated in the conclaves of 1559, which elected Pope Pius IV, and of 1565–1566, which elected Pope Pius V.

He died on 19 November 1568 in Rome and was buried in his titular church of Santa Maria in Via Lata.

== Sources ==
- Miranda, Salvador. "VITELLI, Vitellozzo (1531-1568)". The Cardinals of the Holy Roman Church. Florida International University. OCLC 53276621.
- Cheney, David M. "Vitellozzo Cardinal Vitelli". Catholic-Hierarchy.org. ^{[self-published]}

Catholic Church titles
Preceded by Alessandro Stefano Filodori	Bishop of Città di Castello; 1554–1560	Succeeded by Costantino Bonelli
Preceded by Odet de Coligny de Châtillon	Cardinal-Deacon of Santi Sergio e Bacco; 1557–1559	Succeeded by
Preceded by Anastasio Umberto Dandini	Administrator of Imola; 1560–1561	Succeeded by Francesco Guarini (bishop)
Preceded by Ippolito II d'Este	Cardinal-Deacon of Santa Maria in Via Lata; 1564–1568	Succeeded by Innocenzo Ciocchi del Monte
Preceded by Charles de Bourbon-Vendôme	Administrator of Carcassonne; 1567–1568	Succeeded by Annibal de Ruccellai
