= Girolamo Dandini (cardinal) =

Italian Cardinal Secretary of State

Girolamo Dandini (25 March 1509 – 4 December 1559) was an Italian cardinal and the first to serve as Cardinal Secretary of State in the Roman Curia. By the time of Pope Innocent X (1644–1655), the secretary of state was always a cardinal, and Pope Innocent XII (1691–1700) abolished the office of cardinal nephew in 1692.

== Biography ==
Dandini was born in Cesena on 25 March 1509 to a patrician family, the son of Anselmo Dandini and Giovanna Muratini. He graduated from the University of Bologna with a degree utroque iuris in both canon and civil law. He went to Rome and became secretary to Pope Paul III, who appointed him Protonotary apostolic.

He was sent as nuncio to the court of François I to negotiate peace and to agree on the celebration of a general council, June 1543 to May 1544. He was appointed bishop of Caserta, (14 November 1545), then bishop of Imola (17 May 1546), where he was abbot in commendam of San Firmino. He renounced the see in favour of his nephew, Anastasio Umberto Dandini, who died unexpectedly in 1558, whereupon Cesare Dandini took up the see once more and held it until his death the following year. in the meantime he was again nuncio in France, charged with opposing royal support of Protestantism at the court of the new king, Henri II, July 1546 to September 1547. As legate to Emperor Charles V he negotiated the continuation of the Council of Trent and obtained assistance for the war of Parma and Mirandola. He was named to the lucrative post of commissary general of the papal army.

Dandini was created cardinal by Pope Julius III, in the consistory of 20 November 1551, and was made cardinal-secretary of state, to fill the post of the incompetent cardinal-nephew Innocenzo Ciocchi del Monte.

He participated in the Conclaves of 1555; in the Conclave of 1559 he had to retire from the conclave of 1559 because of illness and died in his palazzo near the Church of San Marcello in Rome, where he is buried.

Catholic Church titles
Preceded by Girolamo Verallo	Bishop of Caserta; 1544–1546	Succeeded by Marzio Cerboni
Preceded by Niccolò Ridolfi	Bishop of Imola; 1546–1552	Succeeded by Anastasio Umberto Dandini
Preceded by Bartolomé de la Cueva y Toledo	Cardinal-Priest of San Matteo in Merulana; 1551–1555	Succeeded by Giovanni Bernardino Scotti
Preceded by Girolamo Verallo	Cardinal-Priest of San Marcello; 1555–1559	Succeeded by Giovanni Andrea Mercurio
