= Giuseppe Fabiani =

Italian Catholic bishop (1926–2019)

- Bishop of Imola
- Church: Catholic Church
- Diocese: Diocese of Imola
- In office: 19 July 1989 – 18 October 2002
- Predecessor: Luigi Dardani
- Successor: Tommaso Ghirelli

Orders
- Ordination: 20 May 1950 by Mario Bondini
- Consecration: 10 September 1989 by Giacomo Biffi

Personal details
- Born: 27 November 1926 Bertinoro, Province of Forlì-Cesena, Kingdom of Italy
- Died: 25 June 2019 (aged 92) Bologna, Emilia-Romagna, Italy

Giuseppe Fabiani (27 November 1926 – 25 June 2019) was an Italian Catholic bishop.

Fabiani was born in Bertinoro and was ordained to the priesthood in 1950. He served as bishop of the Diocese of Imola, Italy, from 1989 until 2002.
