= Domenico Scribonio dei Cerboni =

Most Reverend Domenico Scribonio dei Cerbo
- Bishop of Imola
- Church: Catholic Church
- Diocese: Diocese of Imola
- In office: 1511–1533
- Predecessor: Simone Bonadies
- Successor: Niccolò Ridolfi

Domenico Scribonio dei Cerbo was a Roman Catholic prelate who served as Bishop of Imola (1511–1533).

On 10 February 1511, Domenico Scribonio dei Cerbo was appointed during the papacy of Pope Julius II as Bishop of Imola. He served as Bishop of Imola until his resignation in 1533. While bishop, he was the principal co-consecrator of Antonio Beccari, Bishop of Shkodrë (1524).

== External links and additional sources ==
- Cheney, David M. "Diocese of Imola". Catholic-Hierarchy.org. (for Chronology of Bishops) ^{[self-published]}
- Chow, Gabriel. "Diocese of Imola (Italy)". GCatholic.org. (for Chronology of Bishops) ^{[self-published]}

Catholic Church titles
Preceded by Simone Bonadies	Bishop of Imola; 1511–1533	Succeeded by Niccolò Ridolfi
