= Diocese of Imola =

Roman Catholic diocese in Italy

Diocese of Imola Dioecesis Imolensis

Catholic
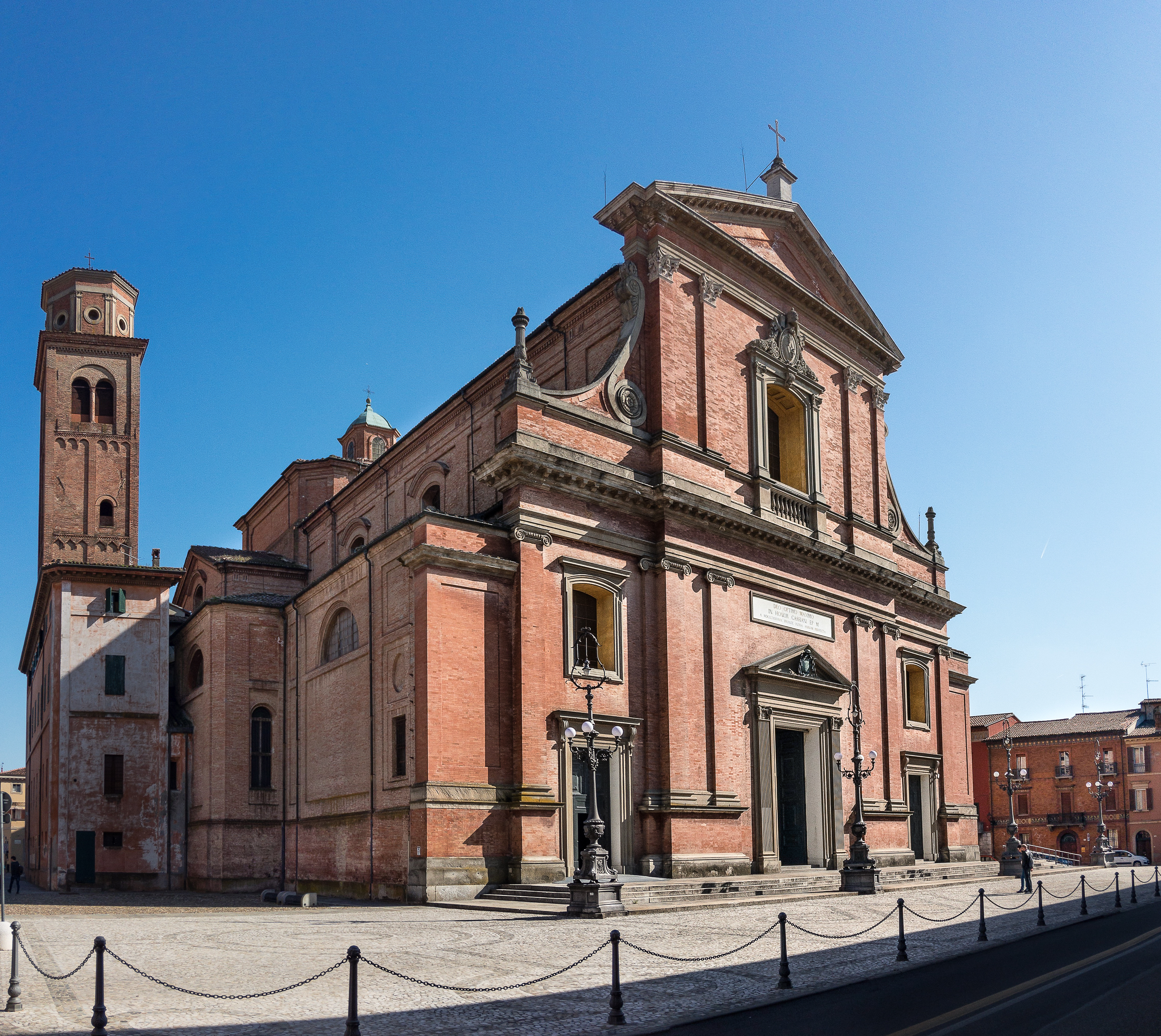
- Cathedral of Imola

Location
- Country: Italy
- Ecclesiastical province: Bologna

Statistics
- Area: 740 km^{2} (290 sq mi)
- Population: Total; Catholics: (as of 2023); 141,740 (est.) ▼; 134,640 (guess) ▼
- Parishes: 108

Information
- Denomination: Catholic
- Sui iuris church: Latin Church
- Rite: Roman Rite
- Established: 4th Century
- Cathedral: Basilica Cattedrale di S. Cassiano Martire
- Secular priests: 74 (diocesan) ▼16 (religious Orders) ▼21 Permanent Deacons ▲

Current leadership
- Pope: Leo XIV
- Bishop: Giovanni Mosciatti
- Bishops emeritus: Tommaso Ghirelli

Website
- www.diocesiimola.it (in Italian)

The Diocese of Imola (Latin: Diocesis Imolensis) is a Latin Church diocese of the Catholic Church in Romagna, northern Italy. It is a suffragan of the Archdiocese of Bologna. The diocese had originally been a suffragan of the metropolitan of Milan, and was then subject to the Archbishop of Ravenna until 1582, when Pope Gregory XIII made Bologna an archbishopric and assigned it two suffragans, Imola and Cervia. In 1604, however, Pope Clement VIII returned them to the metropolitanate of Ravenna. Pope Pius VII transferred Imola back to the metropolitanate of Bologna.

The diocese of Imola is noted for having had a number of its bishops elected to the Papacy, including Cardinal Fabio Chigi (1652), afterwards Pope Alexander VII; Cardinal Barnaba Chiaramonti (1785), afterwards Pope Pius VII; and Cardinal Giovanni Maria Mastai Ferretti (1832), afterwards Pope Pius IX.

== History ==
The Christian origins of Imola are obscure. The episcopal see certainly antedates St. Ambrose, who, during a vacancy in the diocese of Imola, asked the bishop of Voghenza (the ancient Vicus Haventia), to visit the church of Imola, until a bishop was consecrated, since Ambrose himself was occupied and unable to carry out a visitation. Ambrose was concerned about the Gothic Arians and the inroads that their heresies were making on the orthodox Christians.

In 435 Emperor Valentinian III built the church of S. Maria in Arenula. The bishop then was Cornelius, whose archdeacon Peter was appointed Bishop of Ravenna by Pope Sixtus III. Bishop Peter, known as Chrysologus, gave a magnificent eulogy of Bishop Cornelius at the consecration of his successor, Projectus.

In 888, Pope Stephen V ordered the Archbishop of Ravenna to see to it that a bishop was canonically elected for Imola. There was to be no election while the incumbent was still alive, even though he might be ill. When there was a legitimate vacancy, the Clergy was to carry out the election, and the People were to approve it. There had earlier been strife in the city when the People attempted to elect a bishop without reference to the Clergy. It was only later that the Cathedral Chapter began to exercise the rights which had once belonged to the entire Clergy. By the year 1217, the right to elect the bishop belonged to the Canons of the Cathedral of S. Cassiano and the Canons of San Lorenzo, acting as a single electoral college.

On 7 August 1118, Pope Gelasius II restored to the Archbishop of Ravenna all of the dioceses which had been removed from his metropolitanate by Pope Paschal II, due to the participation of the archbishops in the schism that supported the Emperor Henry IV. One of the dioceses that was restored to Ravenna was the diocese of Imola.

Other bishops are: John (946), who restored the cathedral and embellished the tomb of St. Peter Chrysologus; Ridolfo (1146) and Enrico (1174), who suffered for their adherence to Pope Alexander III, Enrico laid the foundations of the present cathedral, finished in 1271 under Bishop Sinibaldo; Pietro Ondedei (1416), a distinguished canonist and theologian; the Dominican Gaspare Sighigelli (1450), learned and saintly; Girolamo Dandini (1546), formerly nuncio at Paris, founder of an orphan asylum; Francesco Guarini (1566), the founder of the seminary; Cardinal Filippo Antonio Gualterio (1702), founder of a mone frumentario to supply the poor peasant with seed; and Cardinal Giovanni Carlo Bandi (1752), who rebuilt the cathedral and the basilica of Valentinian.

=== French occupation ===
The Battle of Lodi was fought on 10 May 1796, giving the general of the army of the French Republic, Napoleon Bonaparte, a claim to having routed Austrian forces. The claim was actually established after he won the Battle of Mantua, the battle at the Arcola, and the Battle of Rivoli. On 27 June an armistice was arranged between Napoleon and the papal armies of Pope Pius VI, in which the Pope lost control of the March of Ferrara and Bologna. On 1 February 1797 the city of Imola was occupied by the French. The Bishop of Imola, Cardinal Chiaramonti, was ordered by the Pope not to fall into the hands of the French, and therefore he fled from Imola to Cesena, intending to head for Rome. At Spoleto, however, he received a plea from the French magistrates and Bonapartists in Imola to return, but after writing to the Pope, who pointed out that Chiaramonti had no way of controlling them, he continued on his journey to Rome. In fear of being supplanted on his episcopal throne by some French-sponsored intruder, he obtained papal permission to return.

On 17 February 1797, Napoleon and papal representatives signed the Treaty of Tolentino, in which the Pope surrendered Avignon, the Comtat Venaissin, and the Romagna. Imola was incorporated into the short lived Cispadane Republic (16 October 1796 – 9 July 1797). On 18 October 1797 Bonaparte entered into the Treaty of Campo Formio with the Austrians, promising them in secret clauses the Republic of Venice; he was able to withdraw to Paris, and then set off on his eastern expedition. In his Christmas message of 1797, therefore, Cardinal Chiaramonti faced impossible difficulties in attempting to calm the Imolese and to suggest a way through the political situation. He wrote.

The democratic form of government adopted among you is not in opposition to the maxims already set forth, nor repugnant to the Gospel. On the contrary, it exacts all the sublime virtues which are learned only in the school of Jesus Christ, and which, when religiously practised by you, will constitute your felicity, the glory and spirit of your republic. Let virtue alone, which perfects man and directs him towards the supreme end, the highest and best of all, let this virtue alone, quickened by the natural lights and strengthened by the teachings of the Gospel, be the solid foundation of our democracy.

The French army which was left behind, led by General Berthier, occupied Rome on 10 February 1798, and arrested the Pope on 20 February. Pius VI was deported to Siena and then to Florence.

The Austrians took the opportunity of Bonaparte's absence from Italy to advance into territory which Bonaparte had seized, and on 30 June 1799 Imola was occupied by the Austrians.

Pope Pius VI died on 29 August 1799, in the fortress of Valence, a prisoner of the French Directory. The Conclave to elect his successor took some time to find a secure place to hold its meetings. The pope and cardinals had been expelled from Rome in 1798, and there were few places where the cardinals could assemble without fear of French interference. They chose Venice, which was under the "protection" of the Austrians. The Conclave opened on 30 November 1799, and on 14 March 1800 Cardinal Chiaramonti, Bishop of Imola, was elected pope. He chose the name Pius VII. He did not, however, relinquish the diocese of Imola, retaining it until his return from his imprisonment in France (1808–1814) by the Emperor Napoleon. In the Consistory of 8 March 1816, Pius resigned the diocese of Imola into the hands of Cardinal Antonio Rusconi.

After the Battle of Marengo on 14 June 1800, Imola again found itself under French occupation and incorporated into the Cisalpine Republic, and then into Napoleon's Kingdom of Italy (1805–1814).

On 16 September 1803, Pius VII (Chiaramonti) entered into a Concordat with the Praeses reipublicae Italicae, primus Gallicanae reipublicae Consul (Napoleon Bonaparte), which included provisions for redrawing the map of the ecclesiastical provinces of northern Italy. In Article II, Imola, Reggio, Modena, and Carpi were assigned as suffragans of the diocese of Bologna.

=== Cathedral and Chapter ===
The Cathedral of Imola is dedicated to the memory of the martyr Cassianus of Imola. Cassiano was not a bishop of Imola. The cathedral was served by a Chapter of Canons, headed by seven dignities. The dignities were: the Provost, the Archdeacon, the Archpriest, the Dean, the Primicerius, the Thesaurius, and the Custos. There were eleven Canons, each with a prebend. In 1751, there were eight dignities and twelve Canons.

The bishops of Imola enjoyed the right to appoint, confirm, enthrone, and invest the Canons of the Cathedral Chapter, the Provosts, and the other prelates. The Bishop and Canons together elected the Sacristan, but the bishop alone confirms and invests.

The Provost and Canons are mentioned as parties to a lawsuit in a mandate of Pope Urban III (1185–1187). In 1511, Pope Julius II secularized the Provostship, and reserved the appointment to the Holy See. His first appointment was Giovanni Battista Vulpi, a Protonotary Apostolic and brother of the soldier Taddeo Vulpi. The dignity of Primicerius was created in 1504 by Bishop Simone Bonadies (1488–1511). The dignity of Treasurer was created in 1513, and was under the patronage of the Saxatelli family, and then the Machirelli. The dignity of Custos was instituted in 1526. It was Bishop Alessandro Musotti (1579–1607) who instituted the Canon Penitentiarius and the Canon Theologus out of the eleven Canons, in accordance with the decree of the Council of Trent.

In the 12th century, the Canons lived in Castro S. Cassiani, in a building called the Canonica, which was near enough to the Episcopal Palace that the bishop could observe visually the comings and goings of the Canons. Not all of the Canons resided in the Canonica, however; some are recorded from time to time as living in the Guest House (Xenodochium) of the Monastery of S. Vitale, which belonged to the Canons. In the second half of the 12th century, under Bishops Rodulphus (1147–1168), Arardus, and Henricus (1173–1193), when the Castro S. Cassiani was in ruins, they moved to the village of Duccia. Then Bishop Henricus built them a new house in Imola itself, to which the Canons moved in 1188.

After his return to Rome from a year-long visit to Imola (having been driven out of his native Florence), Cardinal Niccolò Ridolfi, the Apostolic Administrator of Imola (1533–1546), sent the diocese a set of Constitutions for the Canons of the Cathedral.

The city of Imola also had a Collegiate church, San Lorenzo, which was of such ancient foundation that the original church collapsed in 967, and had to be rebuilt. The Chapter was presided over by an Archpriest, and included a number of Canons. In 1313 the financial situation of the church had so diminished due to wars and both internal and external strife that the full complement of Canons could not be maintained. Bishop Matteo Orsini, O.P. (1302–1317) therefore ordered that the church should be governed by the Archpriest, and by four Canons in priestly orders.

=== Synods ===
A diocesan synod was an irregular but important meeting of the bishop of a diocese and his clergy. Its purpose was (1) to proclaim generally the various decrees already issued by the bishop; (2) to discuss and ratify measures on which the bishop chose to consult with his clergy; (3) to publish statutes and decrees of the diocesan synod, of the provincial synod, and of the Holy See.

Bishop Carolo Alidosi (1342–1353) presided over a general synod of prelates and clerics and the whole clergy of the city and diocese of Imola on 12 August 1346. They heard complaints on the part of Fra Paulino da Urbino, O.P., against depredations against their convent and church of Saint Nicholas in Imola.

Cardinal Ridolfi also ordered the convocation of a diocesan synod, for the reform of the clergy. The synod took place in the Cathedral of Imola on 14 June 1538, under the presidency of Canon Girolamo Ferri, the Cardinal's Vicar General. Bishop Alessandro Musotti (1579–1607) held a diocesan synod on 22 August 1584; its Constitutions were published by order of Cardinal Donghi in 1659. Bishop Rodolfo Paleotti (1611–1619) held a diocesan synod on 22 May 1614, and published its decrees. Bishop Ferdinando Millini (1619–1644) held three diocesan synods, in 1622, 1628, and 1638, whose Constitutions were also published by Cardinal Donghi. Donghi himself held a synod on 29 and 30 April 1659. Bishop Costanzo Zani, O.S.B. (1672–1694) held a diocesan synod in the Cathedral of Saint Cassianus on 29–31 March 1693.

In 1718, Bishop Ulisse Gozzadini (1710–1728) presided at a diocesan synod, whose decrees were published. Cardinal Giuseppe Accoramboni (1728–1739) conducted a diocesan synod on 25–27 October 1738. Cardinal Giovanni Carlo Bandi (1752–1784) held a synod in 1764.

Bishop Paolino Tribbioli (1913–1956) presided over a diocesan synod on 4–6 July 1938. A synod was held from 2009 to 2011 by Bishop Tommaso Ghirelli.

== Bishops of Imola ==
=== to 1200 ===
- Ignotus (before 378/379)

...

- Cornelius (first half of 5th century)
- Projectus (attested c. 429-c. 450)

...

- Pacatianus (502)

[Maurelius (542)]
...

- Ignotus (c. 597/598)

...

- Petrus (attested 861)
- Ignotus
- Sede vacante (886/888)
- Ignotus

...

- Joannes (attested 967)

...

- Paulus (attested 1029)
- Peregrinus
- Odalricus (attested 1053, 1060, 1063, 1174)
- Morandus
- Otho
- Ubaldus
- Otricus
- Benno (c. 1126–1130)
- Randuinus
- Gerardus
- Rodulphus (1147–1168)
- Arardus
- Henricus (1173–1193)
- Albertus Auxelletti (1193–1201)

=== 1200 to 1600 ===
- Jeremias (1202–1205)
- Mainardinus Aldigieri (1207–1249 ?)
- Tommaso Ubaldini (c. 1249–1269)
- Sinibaldus (1270–1297)
- Benedictus (1298-1299)
- Joannes Mutus de Papazurris (1300–1302)
- Matteo Orsini, O.P. (1302–1317)
- Raimboldus (1317–1341)
- Carolo Alidosi (1342–1353)
- Litus Alidosi (1354–1381)
- Guilelmo Alidoso (1382)
- Giacomo Carafa (1383–1384)
- Emmanuel Fieschi (1386–1390) (Roman Obedience)
- Antonio Calvi (1390–1395) (Roman Obedience)
- Giacomo Guidotti (1395–1399) (Roman Obedience)
- Nicolaus (1399–1402) (Roman Obedience)
- Francesco of Nice (de Nizza) (1399–1403) (Avignon Obedience)
- Ermanno Brancaleone (1402-1412) (Roman Obedience)
- Pietro Ondedei (1412–1450) (Pisan-Roman Obedience)
- Gaspare di San Giovanni, O.P. (1450–1457)
- Antonio Castellano de la Volta

Giovanni Dati, O.E.S.A. (1471) Bishop-elect

- Giorgio Bucchi (1471–1479)
- Giacomo Passarella da Cesena (1479–1488)
- Simone Bonadies (17 Sep 1488 –1511)
- Domenico Scribonio dei Cerboni (10 Feb 1511 – 1533 Resigned)

Cardinal Niccolò Ridolfi (1533–1546 Resigned) Administrator

- Girolamo Dandini (1546– 11 May 1552 Resigned)
- Anastasio Umberto Dandini, O.S.B. (1552–1558)

Sede vacante (1558–1560)

- Cardinal Vitellozzo Vitelli (1560–1561 Resigned) Administrator
- Francesco Guarini (1561–1569)
- Cardinal Giovanni Aldobrandini (1569–1573)
- Vincenzo Ercolano, O.P. (9 Feb 1573 – 27 Nov 1579)
- Alessandro Musotti (9 Dec 1579 – 23 Jan 1607 Died)

=== 1600 to 1900 ===
- Cardinal Giovanni Garzia Mellini (1607–1611)
- Rodolfo Paleotti (1611–1619)
- Ferdinando Millini (1619–1644)
- Mario Theodoli (1644–1646)
- Marco Antonio Coccini (1646–1651?)
- Cardinal Fabio Chigi (13 May 1652 – 7 Apr 1655 Elected, Pope)
- Cardinal Giovanni Stefano Donghi (2 Aug 1655 – 26 Feb 1663 Appointed, Bishop of Ferrara)
- Francesco Maria Ghislieri (1 Sep 1664 – 1672 Resigned)
- Costanzo Zani, O.S.B. (1672–1694)
- Cardinal Taddeo Luigi dal Verme (1696–1701)
- Cardinal Filippo Antonio Gualtieri (1701–1709)
- Cardinal Ulisse Giuseppe Gozzadini (19 Feb 1710 – 20 Mar 1728 Died)
- Giuseppe Accoramboni (12 Apr 1728 – 22 Feb 1739 Resigned)
- Giovanni Marelli, C.O. (23 Feb 1739 – 9 Feb 1752 Died)
- Giovanni Carlo Bandi (20 Mar 1752 – 23 Mar 1784 Died)
- Barnaba Chiaramonti, O.S.B. (14 Feb 1785 – 8 Mar 1816)
- Antonio Lamberto Rusconi (8 Mar 1816 – 1 Aug 1825 Died)
- Giacomo Giustiniani (13 Mar 1826 – 16 Dec 1832 Resigned)
- Giovanni Maria Mastai-Ferretti (17 Dec 1832 –1846)
- Cardinal Gaetano Baluffi (1846–1866)
- Vincenzo Moretti (1867–1871)
- Luigi Tesorieri (27 Oct 1871 – 2 Apr 1901 Died)

=== Since 1900 ===
- Francesco Baldassarri (15 Apr 1901 – 9 Nov 1912 Died)
- Paolino Giovanni Tribbioli, O.F.M. Cap. (9 Apr 1913 – 12 May 1956 Died)
- Benigno Carrara (12 May 1956 Succeeded – 12 Mar 1974 Retired)
- Luigi Dardani (12 Mar 1974 – 19 Jul 1989 Retired)
- Giuseppe Fabiani (19 Jul 1989 – 18 Oct 2002 Retired)
- Tommaso Ghirelli (18 Oct 2002 – 31 May 2019)
- Giovanni Mosciatti (31 May 2019 - )

== Bibliography ==
=== Reference works ===
- Gams, Pius Bonifatius (1873). Series episcoporum Ecclesiae catholicae: quotquot innotuerunt a beato Petro apostolo. Ratisbon: Typis et Sumptibus Georgii Josephi Manz. pp. 701–703. (in Latin)
- Eubel, Conradus, ed. (1913). Hierarchia catholica (in Latin). Vol. 1 (second ed.). Münster: Libreria Regensbergiana.
- Eubel, Conradus, ed. (1914). Hierarchia catholica (in Latin). Vol. 2 (second ed.). Münster: Libreria Regensbergiana.
- Eubel, Conradus; Gulik, Guilelmus (1923). Hierarchia catholica (in Latin). Vol. 3 (second ed.). Münster: Libreria Regensbergiana.
- Gauchat, Patritius (Patrice) (1935). Hierarchia catholica (in Latin). Vol. IV (1592-1667). Münster: Libraria Regensbergiana.
- Ritzler, Remigius; Sefrin, Pirminus (1952). Hierarchia catholica medii et recentis aevi (in Latin). Vol. V (1667-1730). Patavii: Messagero di S. Antonio.
- Ritzler, Remigius; Sefrin, Pirminus (1958). Hierarchia catholica medii et recentis aevi (in Latin). Vol. VI (1730-1799). Patavii: Messagero di S. Antonio.
- Ritzler, Remigius; Sefrin, Pirminus (1968). Hierarchia Catholica medii et recentioris aevi sive summorum pontificum, S. R. E. cardinalium, ecclesiarum antistitum series (in Latin). Vol. VII (1800–1846). Monasterii: Libr. Regensburgiana.
- Remigius Ritzler; Pirminus Sefrin (1978). Hierarchia catholica Medii et recentioris aevi (in Latin). Vol. VIII (1846–1903). Il Messaggero di S. Antonio.
- Pięta, Zenon (2002). Hierarchia catholica medii et recentioris aevi (in Latin). Vol. IX (1903–1922). Padua: Messagero di San Antonio. ISBN 978-88-250-1000-8.

=== Studies ===
- Alberghetti, Giuseppe (1810). Benacci, Giuseppe (ed.). Compendio della storia civile ecclesiastica & letteraria della città d'Imola (in Italian). Vol. Parte prima. Imola: tip. di B. Filippini. Parte seconda. 1810. Parte terza. 1810.
- Cappelletti, Giuseppe (1844). Le chiese d'Italia della loro origine sino ai nostri giorni, vol. II, Venezia 1844, pp. 189–240. (in Italian)
- Gaddoni, Serafino (1927). Le chiese della diocesi d'Imola. 4 vols. Imola. 1927. (in Italian)
- Kehr, Paul Fridolin (1906). Italia Pontificia Vol. V: Aemilia, sive Provincia Ravennas. Berlin: Weidmann, pp. 161–173. (in Latin).
- Lanzoni, Francesco (1927). Le diocesi d'Italia dalle origini al principio del secolo VII (an. 604), vol. II, Faenza 1927. (in Italian)
- Mancurti, Francesco Maria (2005). Memorie della chiesa cattedrale d'Imola incominciando dal quarto secolo sino alla metà del secolo diciottesimo, e più oltre ancora, descritte, e distribuite in sette libri dal canonico Francesco Maria Mancurti, col catalogo in fine de canonici, e de' mansionari della medesima, colla indicazione inoltre di tutti i benefici ecclesiastici in essa eretti, e colle iscrizioni sepolcrali, ed altri monumenti che vi si veggono (in Italian). Imola: Diocesi di Imola. ISBN 978-88-88115-10-8. [an old ms. from the diocesan archives]
- Manzoni, Antonio Maria (1719). Episcoporum Corneliensium sine irnolensium historia (in Latin). Faventii (Faenza): J.A. Archi.
- Ughelli, Ferdinando; Coleti, Niccolò (1717). Italia sacra sive De Episcopis Italiae, et insularum adjacentium (in Latin). Venice: apud Sebastianum Coleti. pp. 618–651.
- Zaccaria, Francesco Antonio (1820). Episcoporum Forocorneliensium series (in Latin). Vol. Tomus I. Imola: Beneccius. Francesco Antonio Zaccaria (1820). Tomus II.
