= Rodolfo Paleotti =

Most Reverend Rodolfo Paleotti
- Bishop of Imola
- Church: Catholic Church
- Diocese: Diocese of Imola
- In office: 1611–1619
- Predecessor: Giovanni Garzia Mellini
- Successor: Ferdinando Millini

Orders
- Consecration: 2 July 1611 by Giovanni Garzia Mellini

Rodolfo Paleotti (died 1619) was a Roman Catholic prelate who served as Bishop of Imola (1611–1619).

== Biography ==
On 27 June 1611, Rodolfo Paleotti was appointed during the papacy of Pope Paul V as Bishop of Imola. On 2 July 1611, he was consecrated bishop by Giovanni Garzia Mellini, Cardinal-Priest of Santi Quattro Coronati, with Marco Antonio Salomone, Bishop Emeritus of Sora, and Alessandro Borghi (bishop), Bishop Emeritus of Sansepolcro, serving as co-consecrators. He was installed on 15 October 1611. He served as Bishop of Imola until his death on 24 May 1619.

While bishop, he was the principal co-consecrator of Gilles de Souvre, Bishop of Comminges (1617).

== External links and additional sources ==
- Cheney, David M. "Diocese of Imola". Catholic-Hierarchy.org. (for Chronology of Bishops) ^{[self-published]}
- Chow, Gabriel. "Diocese of Imola (Italy)". GCatholic.org. (for Chronology of Bishops) ^{[self-published]}

Catholic Church titles
Preceded by Giovanni Garzia Mellini	Bishop of Imola; 1611–1619	Succeeded by Ferdinando Millini
