= Simone Bonadies =

Most Reverend Simone Bonadies
- Bishop of Rimini
- Church: Catholic Church
- Diocese: Diocese of Rimini
- In office: 1511–1518
- Predecessor: Vincenzo Carafa
- Successor: Fabio Cerri dell'Anguillara
- Previous post: Bishop of Imola (1488–1511)

Personal details
- Died: 18 January 1518

Simone Bonadies (died 1518) was a Roman Catholic prelate who served as Bishop of Rimini (1511–1518) and Bishop of Imola (1488–1511).

== Biography ==
On 17 Sep 1488, Simone Bonadies was appointed during the papacy of Pope Innocent VIII as Bishop of Imola. On 10 Feb 1511, he was appointed during the papacy of Pope Julius II as Bishop of Rimini. He served as Bishop of Rimini until his death on 18 Jan 1518.

== External links and additional sources ==
- Cheney, David M. "Diocese of Imola". Catholic-Hierarchy.org. (for Chronology of Bishops) ^{[self-published]}
- Chow, Gabriel. "Diocese of Imola (Italy)". GCatholic.org. (for Chronology of Bishops) ^{[self-published]}
- Cheney, David M. "Diocese of Rimini". Catholic-Hierarchy.org. (for Chronology of Bishops) ^{[self-published]}
- Chow, Gabriel. "Diocese of Rimini (Italy)". GCatholic.org. (for Chronology of Bishops) ^{[self-published]}

Catholic Church titles
Preceded by Giacomo Passarelli	Bishop of Imola; 1488–1511	Succeeded by Domenico Scribonio dei Cerboni
Preceded by Vincenzo Carafa	Bishop of Rimini; 1511–1518	Succeeded by Fabio Cerri dell'Anguillara
