= Ascanio Giacobazio =

Roman Catholic prelate

Most Reverend Ascanio Giacobazio
- Bishop of Anglona-Tursi
- Church: Catholic Church
- Diocese: Diocese of Anglona-Tursi
- In office: 1595–1612
- Predecessor: Nicolò Grana
- Successor: Bernardo Giustiniano

Orders
- Consecration: 1 May 1595 by Alessandro Ottaviano de' Medici

Personal details
- Died: 12 April 1612

Ascanio Giacobazio or Ascanio Giacovazzi (died 12 April 1612) was a Roman Catholic prelate who served as Bishop of Anglona-Tursi (1595–1612).

== Biography ==
On 10 April 1595, Ascanio Giacobazio was appointed Bishop of Anglona-Tursi by Pope Clement VIII. On 1 May 1595, he was consecrated bishop by Alessandro Ottaviano de' Medici, Archbishop of Florence, with Ludovico de Torres, Archbishop of Monreale, and Leonard Abel, Titular Bishop of Sidon, serving as co-consecrators. He served as Bishop of Anglona-Tursi until his resignation in 1609. He died on 12 April 1612.

== External links and additional sources ==
- Cheney, David M. "Diocese of Tursi-Lagonegro". Catholic-Hierarchy.org. (for Chronology of Bishops) ^{[self-published]}
- Chow, Gabriel. "Diocese of Tursi-Lagonegro (Italy)". GCatholic.org. (for Chronology of Bishops) ^{[self-published]}

Catholic Church titles
| Preceded by Nicolò Grana | Bishop of Anglona-Tursi; 1595–1612 | Succeeded by Bernardo Giustiniano |
