= Vincenzo Moretti =

Italian Roman Catholic cardinal

His Eminence Vincenzo Moretti
- Archbishop Emeritus of Ravenna
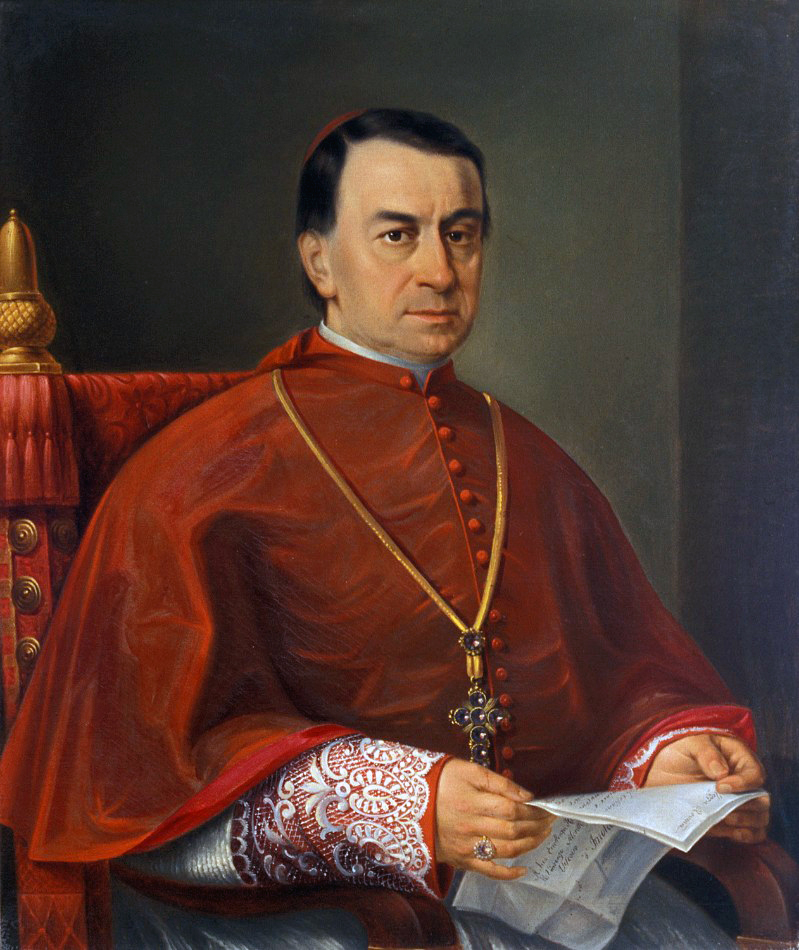
- Church: Roman Catholic Church
- Archdiocese: Ravenna
- See: Ravenna
- Appointed: 27 October 1871
- Term ended: 22 September 1879
- Predecessor: Enrico Orfei
- Successor: Giacomo Catani
- Other post: Cardinal-Priest of Santa Sabina (1877-81)
- Previous posts: Bishop of Comacchio (1855-60); Bishop of Cesena (1860-67); Bishop of Imola (1867-71)

Orders
- Ordination: 22 September 1838
- Consecration: 13 January 1856 by Costantino Patrizi Naro
- Created cardinal: 28 December 1877 by Pope Pius IX
- Rank: Cardinal-Priest

Personal details
- Born: Vincenzo Moretti; 14 November 1815 Orvieto, Papal States
- Died: 6 October 1881 (aged 65) Bologna, Kingdom of Italy
- Education: Collegio Romano

Vincenzo Moretti (14 November 1815 – 6 October 1881) was an Italian Roman Catholic cardinal and the Archbishop of Ravenna from 1871 until his resignation in 1879. He was elevated to the cardinalate in late 1877.

He served first as the Bishop of Comacchio (1855–60) and then as the Bishop of Cesena (1860-1867); he later served as the Bishop of Imola (1867–71) before being transferred to the Ravenna archbishopric. He participated in the 1878 conclave that elected Pope Leo XIII.

== Bibliography ==
- Annuario pontificio (in Italian). Roma: Tip. della Reverenda Camera Apostolica. 1870. p. 171.
- Martin Bräuer (2014). Handbuch der Kardinäle: 1846-2012 (in German). Berlin: De Gruyter. pp. 111–112. ISBN 978-3-11-026947-5.
- Remigius Ritzler; Pirminus Sefrin (1978). Hierarchia catholica Medii et recentioris aevi... A Pontificatu PII PP. IX (1846) usque ad Pontificatum Leonis PP. XIII (1903) (in Latin). Vol. VIII. Il Messaggero di S. Antonio. pp. 52, 168, 217, 320, 477.
