= Antonio Lamberto Rusconi =

His Eminence Antonio Lamberto Rusconi
- Bishop of Imola
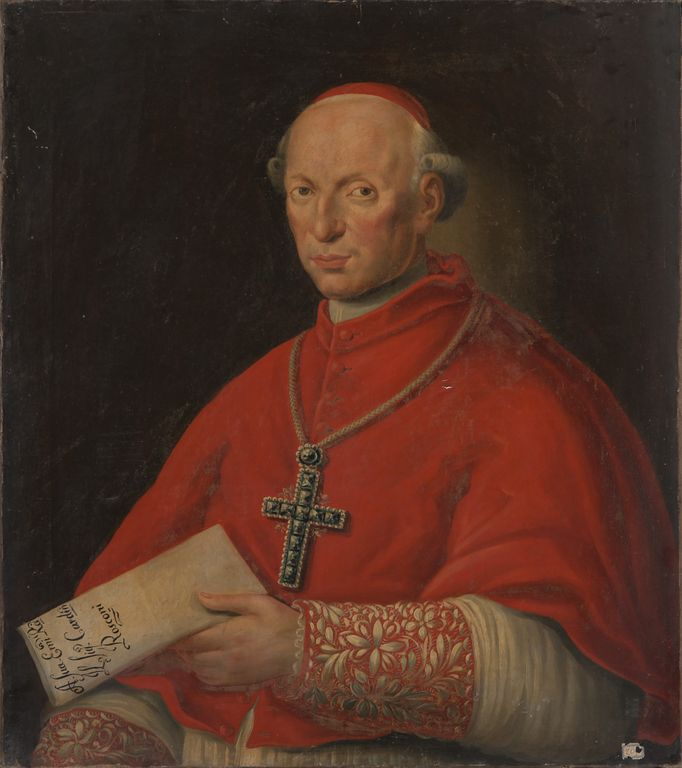
- Church: Roman Catholic Church
- Diocese: Imola
- See: Imola
- Appointed: 8 March 1816
- Term ended: 1 August 1825
- Predecessor: Barnaba Chiaramonti
- Successor: Giacomo Giustiniani
- Other post: Cardinal-Priest of Santi Giovanni e Paolo (1816-25)

Orders
- Ordination: 2 January 1803
- Consecration: 21 March 1816 by Pope Pius VII
- Created cardinal: 8 March 1816 by Pope Pius VII
- Rank: Cardinal-Priest

Personal details
- Born: Antonio Lamberto Rusconi; 19 June 1743 Cento, Bologna, Papal States
- Died: 1 August 1825 (aged 82) Imola, Papal States
- Parents: Domenico Bartolomeo Rusconi; Maria Marta Manari
- Education: University of Bologna
Styles of Antonio Lamberto Rusconi
- Reference style: His Eminence
- Spoken style: Your Eminence
- Informal style: Cardinal
- See: Imola

Antonio Lamberto Rusconi, J.U.D. (19 June 1743 – 1 August 1825) was an Italian cardinal who served as bishop of Imola.

Rusconi was born in Cento within the archdiocese of Bologna of a patrician family. He was the son of Domenico Bartolomeo Rusconi and Maria Marta Manari. He was educated studying law and economic sciences at the University of Bologna. He obtained a doctorate in utroque iure, both canon and civil law.

== Early life ==
He served as a canon of the collegiate church of San Biagio in Cento in 1763. He went to Rome in 1765 to continue his studies. He entered the Roman prelature in the pontificate of Pope Clement XIV, when he was 30 years old. He served as a relator of the Sacred Congregation of the Good Government from 1775 and as such, he visited several localities of the Papal States in the provinces of Sabina, Marittima e Campagna, Benevento and Pontecorvo. He served as a civil auditor of the Camerlengo of the Holy Roman Church, Cardinal Carlo Rezzonico. After the first restoration of the papal government in Rome, Pope Pius VII named him head of the particular deputation for the Grascia on 9 July 1800. He served as an auditor of the Sacred Roman Rota for Bologna from February 1801; he entered in functions on 15 December 1801 and was sworn in on 8 January 1802. He received the diaconate on 1 January 1803.

== Priesthood ==
He was ordained on 2 January 1803. Member of a congregation formed by Cardinal Agostino Rivarola from 11 May 1814, after the second restoration of the papal government in Rome; he was charged with reestablishing the order in the Pontifical Gregorian University, the Archiginnasio dell Sapienza, schools, libraries and museums of the city of Rome; he was also in charge with the administration of the postal service and urban works.

== Cardinalate ==
He was created and proclaimed Cardinal-Priest of Ss. Giovanni e Paolo in the consistory of 8 March 1816.

== Episcopate ==
He was appointed bishop of Imola on 8 March 1816. He was consecrated on 21 March in the Pope's private chapel, Rome, by Pope Pius VII, formerly Barnaba Chiaramonti, cardinal bishop of Imola. Pope Pius was assisted by Francesco Bertazzoli, archbishop of Edessa in partibus infidelium, and by Giuseppe Bartolomeo Menocchio, bishop of Porfireone in partibus infidelium, papal sacristan. Rusconi was appointed as legate in Romagna on 9 February 1820. He participated in the conclave of 1823, which elected Pope Leo XII. He died in 1825 at the age of 82.

Catholic Church titles
Preceded by Barnaba Chiaramonti	Bishop of Imola; 1816–1825	Succeeded by Giacomo Giustiniani
