= Ferdinando Millini =

Most Reverend Ferdinando Millini
- Bishop of Imola
- Church: Catholic Church
- Diocese: Diocese of Imola
- In office: 1619–1644
- Predecessor: Rodolfo Paleotti
- Successor: Mario Theodoli

Orders
- Consecration: 15 Sep 1619 by Giambattista Leni

Personal details
- Born: Jan 1590
- Died: 1644 (age 54)

Ferdinando Millini (1590–1644) was a Roman Catholic prelate who served as Bishop of Imola (1619–1644).

== Biography ==
Ferdinando Millini was born in January 1590. He was the illegitimate son of Paolo Millini, brother of Cardinal Giovanni Garzia Mellini.

On 17 Jun 1619, at the age of only 21, he was appointed Bishop of Imola by Pope Paul V, for which he required a special dispensation because he was below the canonical age for ordination and consecration. This dispensation was issued on 26 June 1619. On 15 Sep 1619, he was consecrated a bishop by Giambattista Leni, Bishop of Ferrara, with Ulpiano Volpi, Archbishop Emeritus of Chieti, and Francesco Sacrati, Titular Archbishop of Damascus, serving as co-consecrators.

Shortly after taking possession of the diocese of Imola, Bishop Millini conducted a general visitation of the diocese, and then, on 12 and 13 April 1622, held a diocesan synod and had its Constitutions published. He held a second synod on 15 May 1628, and again published the Constitutions. He held a third synod in 1638.

He redecorated the Episcopal Palace in Imola in a more elegant style, and built a country villa at Turano. He decorated the attached church. He built a new church for the convent of the Capucines. He admitted the Hermits of Saint Peter of Pisa into the diocese and gave them the Church of S. Giuseppe and the religious house next door.

On a commission from Pope Urban VIII, he successfully mediated the differences between the Duke of Modena and the Duke of Parma. He also acted as quartermaster for the papal troops fighting in the duchy of Ferrara.

Ferdinando Millini served as Bishop of Imola until his death on 13 June 1644.

While bishop, on 22 April 1635, he was the principal co-consecrator of Stefano Durazzo, who became Archbishop of Genoa (1635) and a Cardinal.

Catholic Church titles
Preceded by Rodolfo Paleotti	Bishop of Imola; 1619–1644	Succeeded by Mario Theodoli
