= Alessandro Deti =

Italian Roman Catholic prelate

Most Reverend Alessandro Deti
- Bishop of Anglona-Tursi
- Church: Catholic Church
- Diocese: Diocese of Anglona-Tursi
- In office: 1632–1637
- Predecessor: Giovanni Battista Deti
- Successor: Marco Antonio Coccini

Orders
- Consecration: 9 May 1632 by Giulio Cesare Sacchetti

Personal details
- Died: Jan 1637

Alessandro Deti, also known as Alessandro Deto, was a Roman Catholic prelate who held the office as Bishop of Anglona-Tursi from 1632 to 1637, before dying in January of that year.

== Biography ==
On 26 April 1632, Alessandro Deti was appointed during the papacy of Pope Urban VIII as Bishop of Anglona-Tursi. On 9 May 1632, he was consecrated bishop by Giulio Cesare Sacchetti, Bishop of Fano, with Angelo Cesi, Bishop of Rimini, and Giovanni Battista Scanaroli, Titular Bishop of Sidon. serving as co-consecrators. He served as Bishop of Anglona-Tursi until his death in January 1637. While bishop, he was the principal co-consecrator of Pietro Niccolini, Archbishop of Florence (1632).

== External links and additional sources ==
- Cheney, David M. "Diocese of Tursi-Lagonegro". Catholic-Hierarchy.org. (for Chronology of Bishops) ^{[self-published]}
- Chow, Gabriel. "Diocese of Tursi-Lagonegro (Italy)". GCatholic.org. (for Chronology of Bishops) ^{[self-published]}

Catholic Church titles
Preceded by Giovanni Battista Deti	Bishop of Anglona-Tursi; 1632–1637	Succeeded by Marco Antonio Coccini
