= Giacomo Triga =

Italian painter

Giacomo Triga (1674 - 1746) was an Italian painter, active in Rome, as a painter of religious subjects. He served for a time as court painter to the Marquis Gerolamo Theodoli.

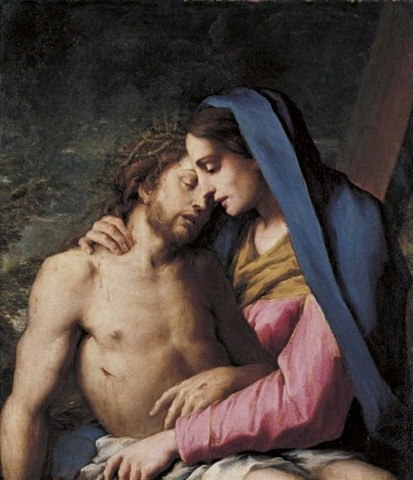
Pietà

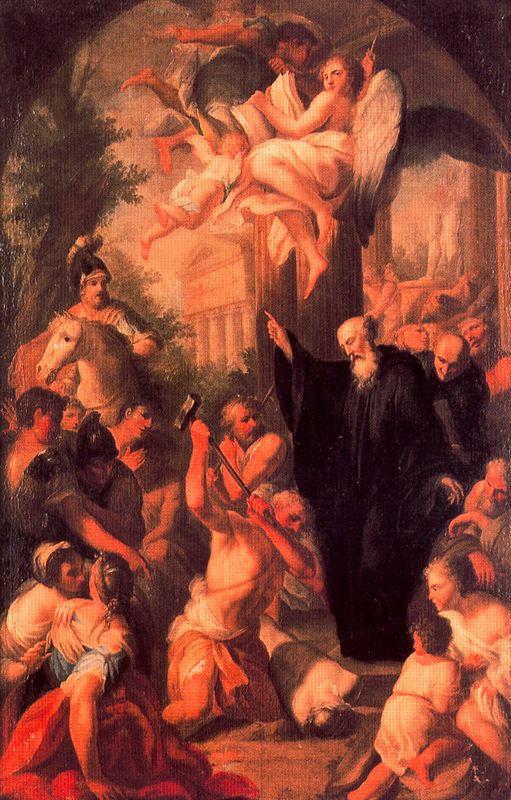
St Benedict destroys the idol of Apollo

== Life ==
Giacomo Triga was born in Rome into a family of Marche origins. His father was a bricklayer. Triga trained under Benedetto Luti. He subsequently became court painter for the Marquis Gerolamo Theodoli. The young Pietro Bianchi served as his apprentice.

In 1715 he received a papal commission to paint the Meeting of Saints Ignatius and Polycarp for San Clemente al Laterano. In 1726 he painted the Martyrdom of Saint Paul for Santi Giovanni e Paolo al Celio.

He painted a fresco depicting the Glory of San Nicola for the church of San Nicola ai Prefetti in Rome. The work was commissioned circa 1729–1730 by his patron, the Marquis Gerolamo Theodoli.

The Marquis refurbished the family chapel at Santa Maria del Popolo The paintings were restored and refreshed by Triga.

He was a member of the Accademia di San Luca and the congregation of the Virtuosi del Pantheon. Triga died in Rome in 1746.
