= Anastasio Umberto Dandini =

Most Reverend Anastasio Umberto Dandini
- Bishop of Imola
- Church: Catholic Church
- Diocese: Diocese of Imola
- In office: 1552–1558
- Predecessor: Girolamo Dandini
- Successor: Vitellozzo Vitelli (cardinal)

Personal details
- Died: 25 March 1558 Imola, Italy

Anastasio Umberto Dandini, O.S.B. was a Roman Catholic prelate who served as Bishop of Imola (1552–1558).

== Biography ==
Anastasio Umberto Dandini was ordained a priest in the Order of Saint Benedict. On 11 May 1552, he was appointed during the papacy of Pope Julius III as Bishop of Imola succeeding his uncle Girolamo Dandini. He served as Bishop of Imola until his death on 25 Mar 1558.

== External links and additional sources ==
- Cheney, David M. "Diocese of Imola". Catholic-Hierarchy.org. (for Chronology of Bishops) ^{[self-published]}
- Chow, Gabriel. "Diocese of Imola (Italy)". GCatholic.org. (for Chronology of Bishops) ^{[self-published]}

Catholic Church titles
Preceded by Girolamo Dandini	Bishop of Imola; 1552–1558	Succeeded by Vitellozzo Vitelli (cardinal)
