= Theodoli Chapel =

Theodoli Chapel Cappella Theodoli
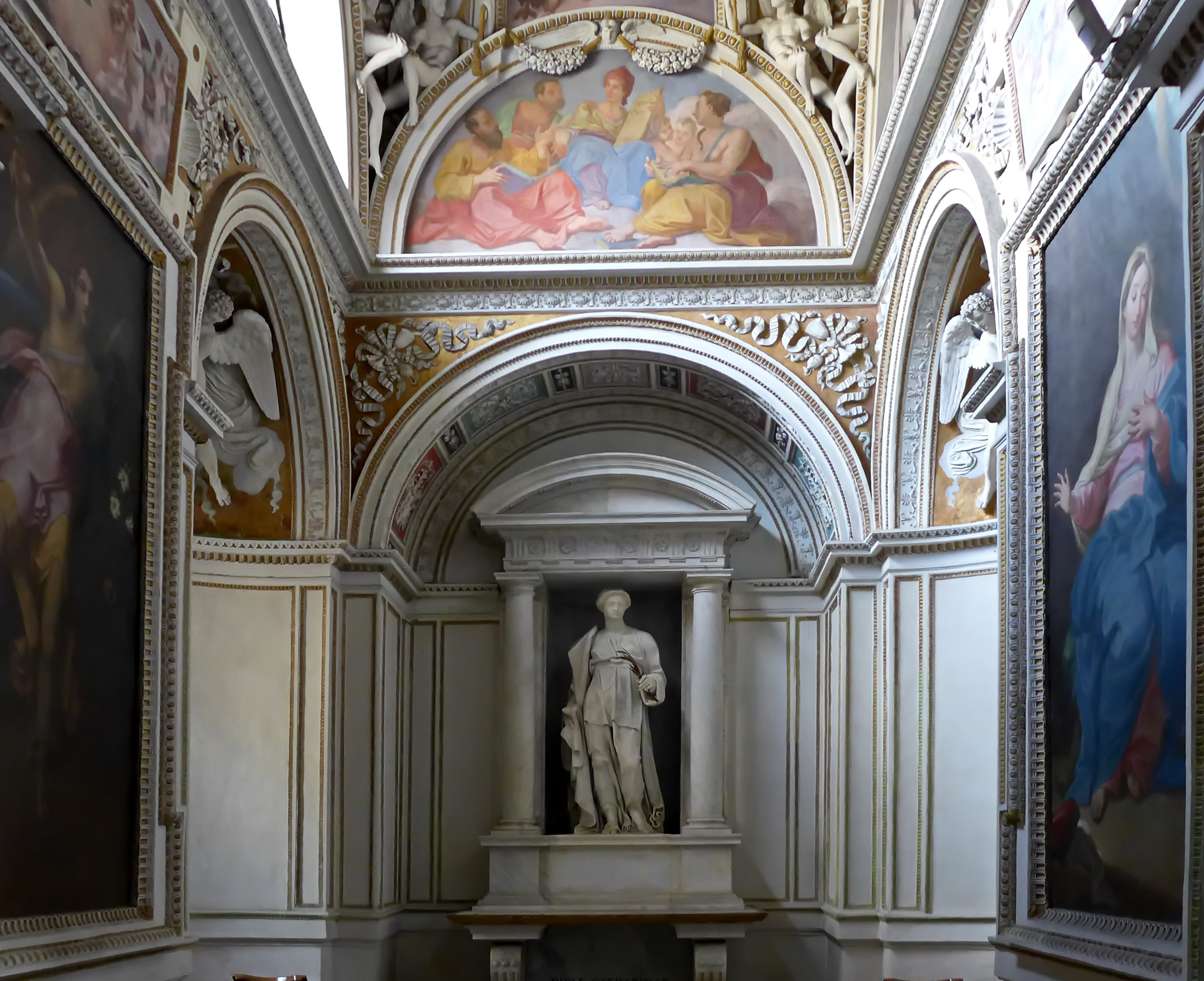

Religion
- Status: side chapel

Location
- Location: Basilica of Santa Maria del Popolo, Rome
- Interactive map of Theodoli Chapel; Cappella Theodoli
- Coordinates: 41.911389°N 12.476389°E

Architecture
- Type: rectangular chapel with three recesses
- Style: Renaissance
- Founder: Traiano Alicorni, Girolamo Theodoli
- Completed: 1575

The Theodoli Chapel or Chapel of Saint Catherine «del Calice» (Italian: Cappella Theodoli, Cappella di Santa Catarina del Calice) in the Basilica of Santa Maria del Popolo in Rome is an important monument of Roman Mannerism. Although less known than some of the other side chapels of the same church it is a major work in the oeuvre of Giulio Mazzoni. The chapel opens at the end of the left arm of the transept next to the famous Cerasi Chapel.

== History ==
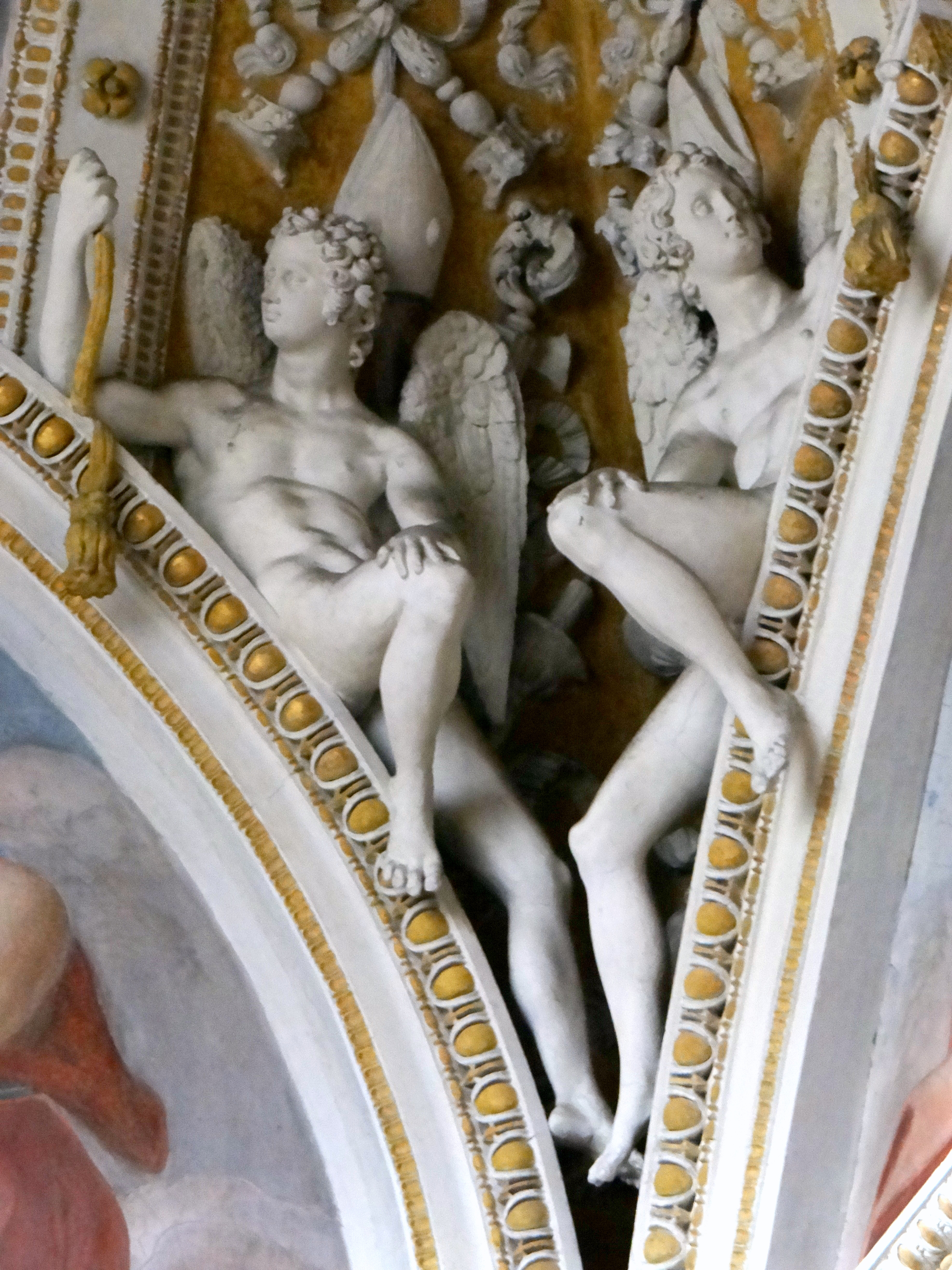
Stucco angels in the corner of the ceiling with the symbols of episcopal authority in the background.

The construction of the chapel coincides with the renovation of the whole building in the mid-sixteenth century. On 10 December 1552 the Vicar-General of the Lombard Congregation allowed the Augustinians to assign two empty chapels to new holders: one of them was located "apud cappella Fusari vulgariter nuncupata la Madonina” ("by the Foscari Chapel, commonly called la Madonnina") and it had been requested by Traiano Alicorni, a Milanese nobleman and protonotary apostolic.

On 27 June 1553 the chapel was granted to Alicorni, and re-dedicated to Saints Lucy, Nazarius and Celsus. The dedication to the most important martyrs of Milan is easily explained by the origins of the Alicorni family. After the death of Traiano Alicorni the property was inherited by his sons, Fausto and Giovanni Battista. The latter renounced his rights on 11 July 1569 in favor of his brother who began to build a tomb in memory of their father. Soon, however, the chapel was returned to the Augustinians, who assigned it to Girolamo Theodoli, the titular bishop of Cádiz, on 24 December 1569.

The two families were linked by common interests and roots in the town of Forlì. The new owner employed the same artist, Giulio Mazzoni of Piacenza, who had already been entrusted by the Alicorni, and maintained the original dedication of the chapel with the addition of Saints Jerome, Catherine and John the Baptist.

The work on the inner decoration had already been started by Traiano Alicorni. He commissioned Giulio Mazzoni in a contract dated to 15 October 1555. The artist undertook the task for the considerable sum of 800 scudi and pledged to finish it within two years. He was still working on it ten years later. Previously the Theodoli Chapel was thought be a late work of Mazzoni but this was disproved by the discovery of the contract.

The iconographic themes of the paintings help to differentiate the two commissions: the vault was certainly painted during the ownership of the Alicorni family, everything in the lower regions and the marble statue of Saint Catherine belong to the Theodoli phase, while the pertinence of the lunettes depends on their interpretation.

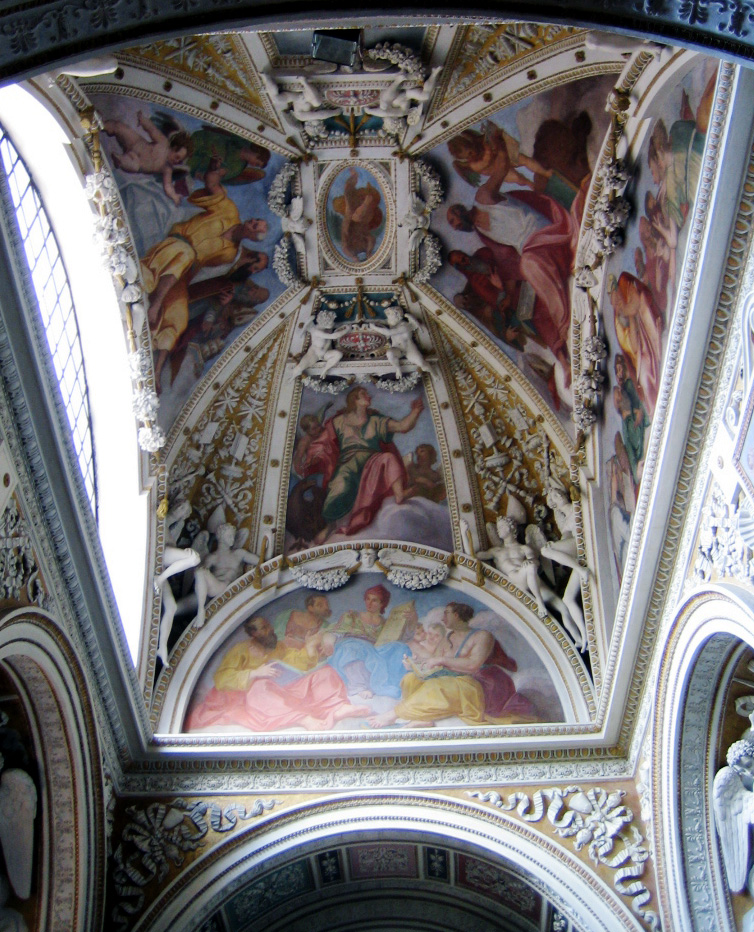
The paintings of the vault

Originally the chapel was called Santa Caterina «del Calice» or «del Cadice» to distinguish it from the Chapel of Santa Caterina «del Portogallo» in the right aisle. There are stucco chalices with ribbons and vases on the spandrels and the statue of Saint Catherine was holding up an antique chalice at least until the first quarter of 18th century (it was definitely missing at the time of the apostolic visitation in 1824 and later replaced by a bronze palm). The symbol of the chalice alluded to the city of Cádiz and the bishopric - although it can be noted that Girolamo Theodoli never set foot in Spain. In 1564 he was forced to resign because his long absence made his position untenable but at the same time he obtained a generous annual income of 3000 scudi. This certainly helped him to acquire and decorate a chapel in the prestigious basilica of Santa Maria del Popolo a few years later.

The choice of Saint Catherine as the main patron saint of the chapel can be partly explained by the fact that she was honored as a family saint among the Theodoli. She was also the namesake of the bishop's mother, Catarina Bezzi. (The other two patron saints were also namesakes, Jerome for the bishop himself, John the Baptist for his uncle, Bishop Giovanni Ruffo Theodoli and his designated heir, Giovanni Theodoli.) Also as relative newcomers in Rome, the Theodoli "needed to augment their history to compete with the old Roman nobility. [...] As Saint Catherine stands for informed Christian wisdom and strength of virtue against all heresy, so, too, do the Theodoli [...] connect themselves to these ideas", argues Cynthia Stollhans.

The completion of the Theodoli Chapel could be placed around 1575 because Mazzoni returned to Piacenza in the next year. The chapel was refurbished by Marquis Girolamo Theodoli about 150 years later. The large stucco cartouche above the entrance arch with the coat of arms of the Theodoli family probably belongs to this phase. The paintings were restored and refreshed by Giacomo Triga, the court painter of marquis. The 18th century redecoration is probably related to the Jubilee Year of 1725 but the intervention did not significantly alter the 16th century aspect of the chapel.

== Description ==
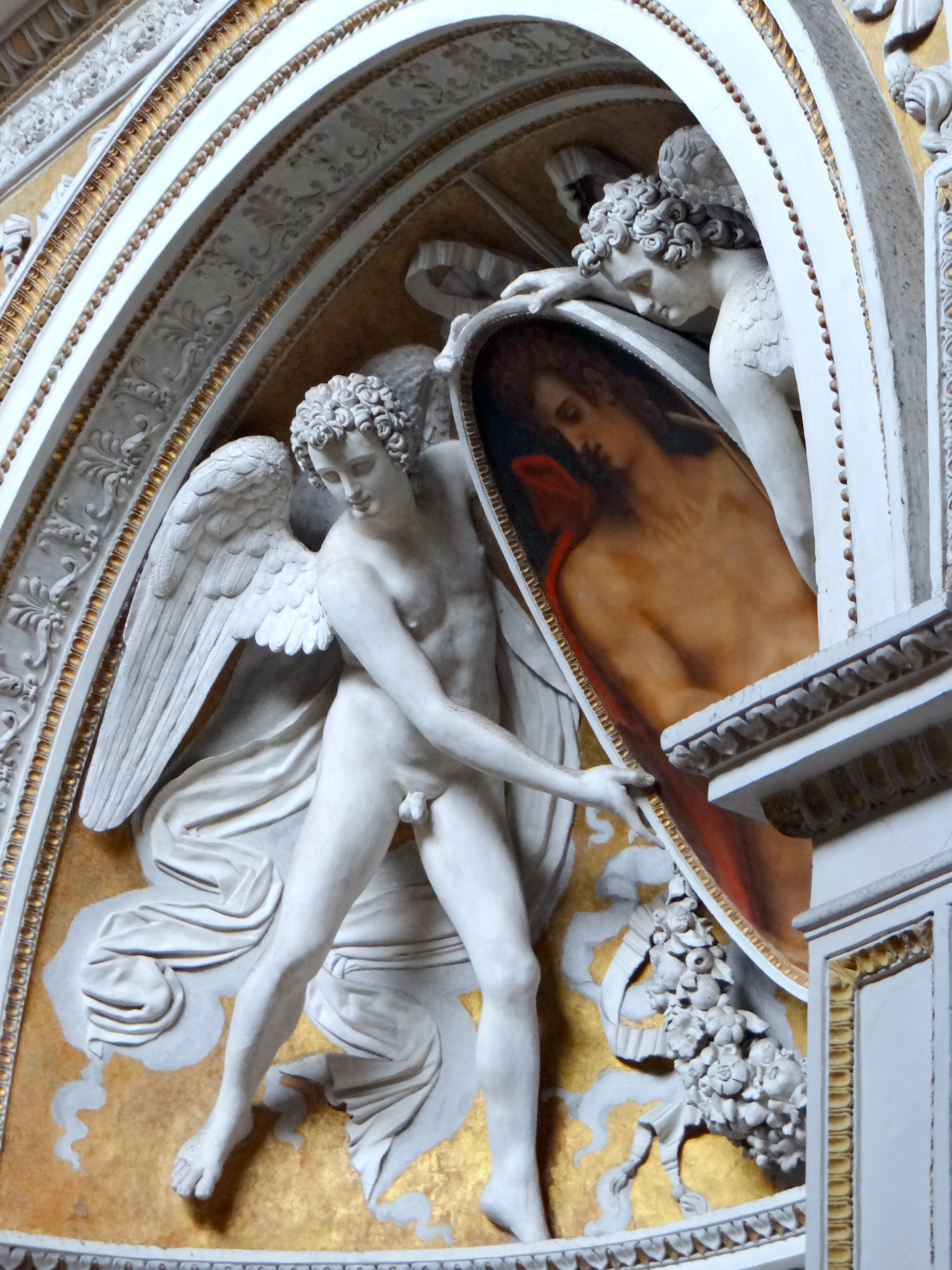
White stucco angels holding a medaillon of St John the Baptist.

According to art historian Patrizia Tosini the altar statue is a mature work of the artist and opened a new era in Mannerist sculpture with its solemn and soft cloths, proto-classicist attitude, composure and chiaroscuro features, „far removed from the rigidity and hyperbole of his contemporaries”. Even the setting of the statue (documented in its present form from the middle of the 17th century) in a Tuscan-style altar made entirely of white marble, evokes more the coldness of certain 19th century funerary monuments, than the colorful and imaginative architectural structures of mid-sixteenth century Roman art. The statue bears the signature of the artist on its pedestal: JULIUS MAZZONUS PLACENTINUS PICTOR ET SCULPTOR. A more conspicuous inscription on the base states: DIVAE CATHARINAE VIRG ET MART DICATUM ("dedicated to Saint Catherine, virgin and martyr"). The traditional attribute of the saint, the "breaking wheel" appears at her side but the instrument of torture is hardly noticeable.

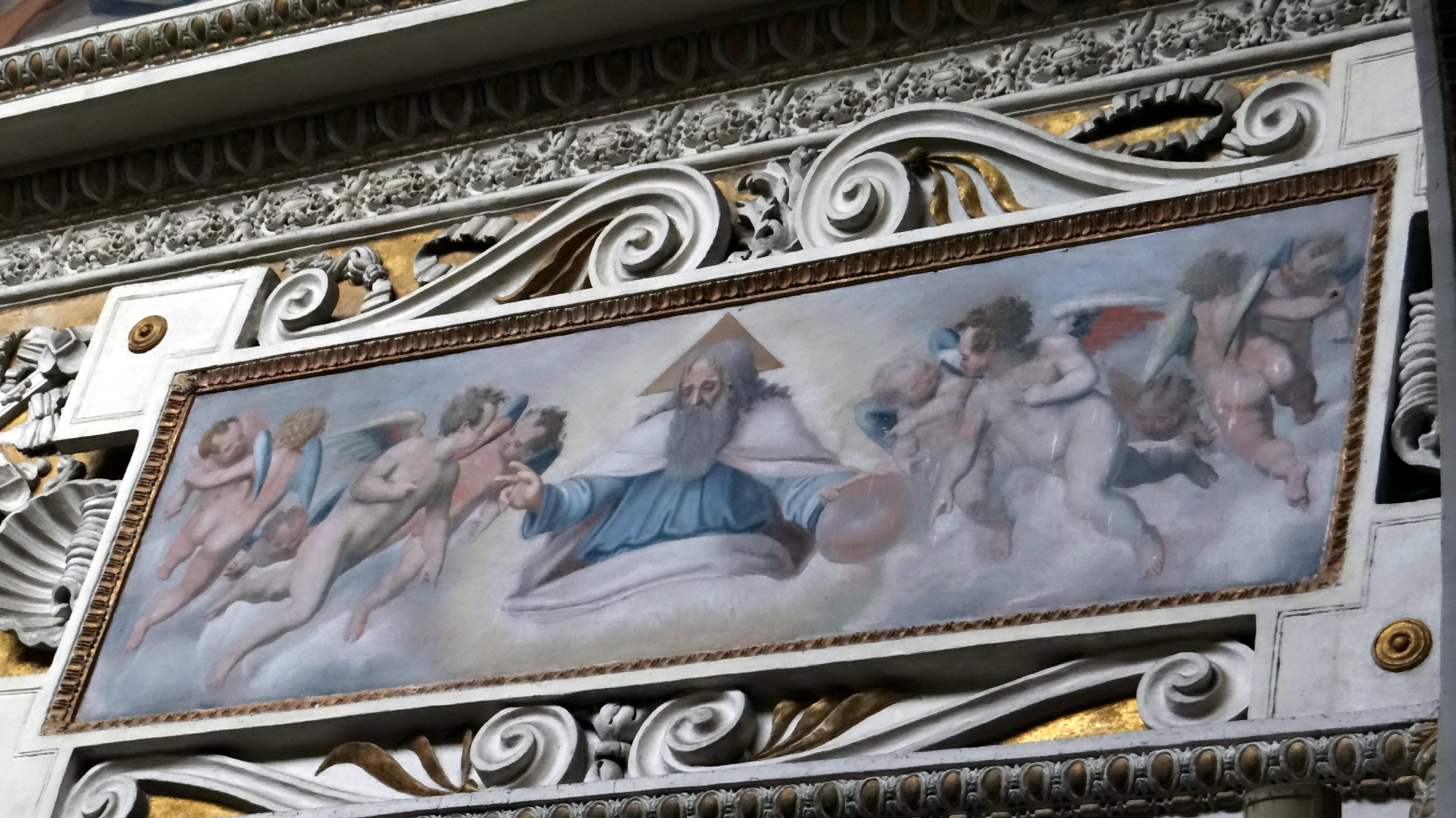
God the Father among angels on the right hand wall.

The vault is divided into trapezoidal panels which are separated by delicate white and gold stucco bands of vases and candelabra. Pairs of dainty stucco angels are resting on the edges of the lunettes in the corners. The trapezoidal panels are filled with paintings of the Four Evangelists with their traditional symbols and angels. In the central medallion an Angel with a laurel wreath appears. Saint Matthew and Saint Mark are accompanied by the four Doctors of the Church: Pope Gregory the Great and St. Ambrose with the former, St. Augustine and St. Jerome with the latter. According to the modern critics significant parts of the painted decoration were executed by Mazzoni while others are contributions of his workshop. The differentiation was made more difficult by a repainting of the frescoes in the 18th century (especially the figure of St. John the Evangelist, the corresponding lunette and St Luke).

There are different interpretations for the paintings in the three lunettes. The fresco on the right side undoubtedly depicts Saint Jerome Teaching among a large group of followers. The other two are simply described by Tosini as "Sybils and Prophets" but Cynthia Stollhans proposed a more complex explanation which takes into account the historic background and the overall iconographic program of the chapel. Thus the scene above the statue is The Disputation of Saint Catherine with the Philosophers, the most famous episode from the life of the saint when she convinced 50 of the best pagan philosophers and orators about the truth of Christianity. The painting shows her in an elevated position with three philosophers reading books and immersed in deep conversation. In the background a pair of little angels appear as heavenly muses. The scene above the entrance was identified by Stollhans as Saint Catherine Teaching. This shows the saint in the middle of a small group of two helping angels, a man and a half-nude woman, all of them studying scrolls. Possibly the fresco depicts the incarcerated Catherine converting Porphyrius, the captain of the imperial guard, another well-known episode from the Golden Legend. The lunettes depict both Saint Catherine and Saint Jerome in similar roles as teachers, preachers, theologians and patrons of learning.

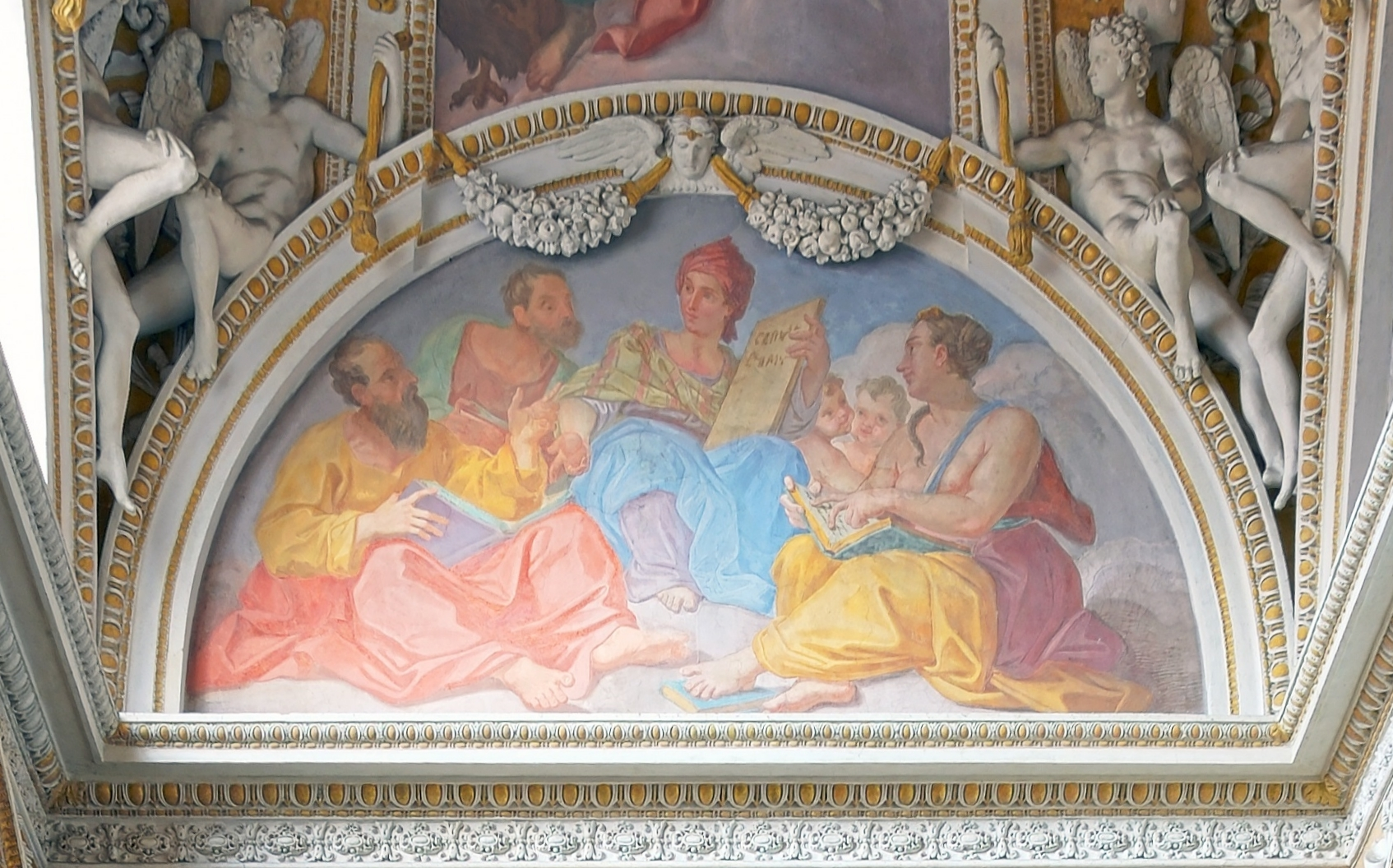
The Disputation of Saint Catherine

The two lateral apses with medallions of Sts. Jerome and John the Baptist celebrate the two male patron saints of Girolamo Theodoli. The painted medallions, which are decorated with ribbons and festoons, are held by pairs of white stucco angels depicted as naked young men. With their lightness and elegance these statues are the best parts of the stucco decoration.

There are two large paintings of the Virgin of the Annunciation and the Angel of the Annunciation on the side walls; the first was repainted from scratch by Giacomo Triga in the beginning of the 18th century, whereas the second was only retouched and retained its typically Mannerist style. Above them two smaller panels depict God the Father among angels and the Dove of the Holy Spirit among angels.

One element of the decoration is a bit enigmatic: the presence of two plaster statues of Saints Peter and Paul which are perhaps the works of one of Mazzoni’s assistants. Their artistic quality is visibly inferior to the other stucco statues. The two sculptures have no iconographic relevance to the dedication of the chapel, and could possibly be justified in the light of the adjacent Cerasi Chapel which was previously dedicated to the patrons of Rome.

The entrance of the chapel is closed by a wrought iron railing. The entrance arch is much lower than the corresponding arch of the transept and its outer surface is decorated by the stucco coats-of-arms of the noble Theodoli family. The soffit of the arch is divided into rectangular panels and bands with floral and foliate stucco ornaments against red or green background. The soffit of the arch above the shallow niche of the altar is decorated in a similar way.

== Gallery ==
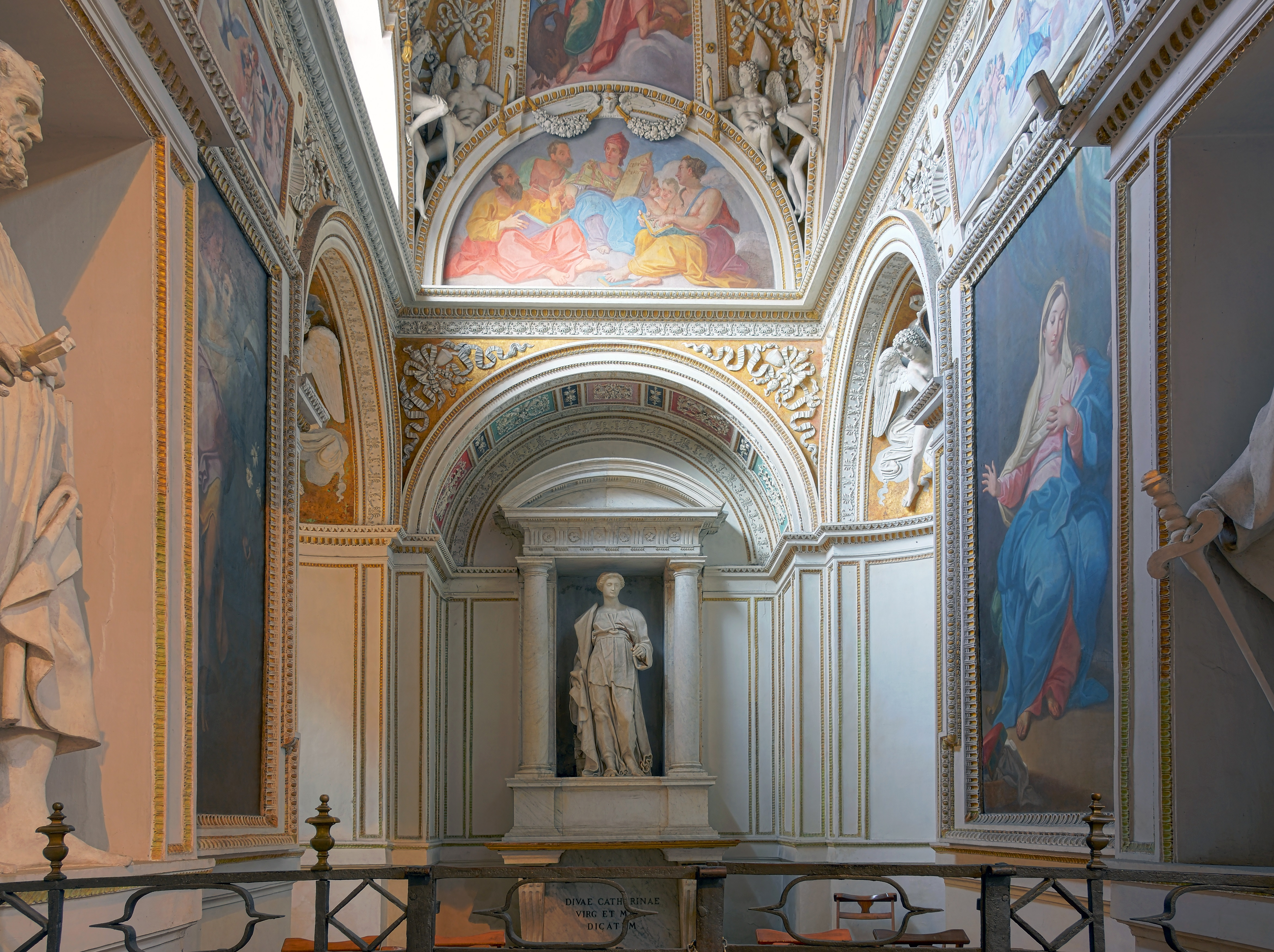
General view

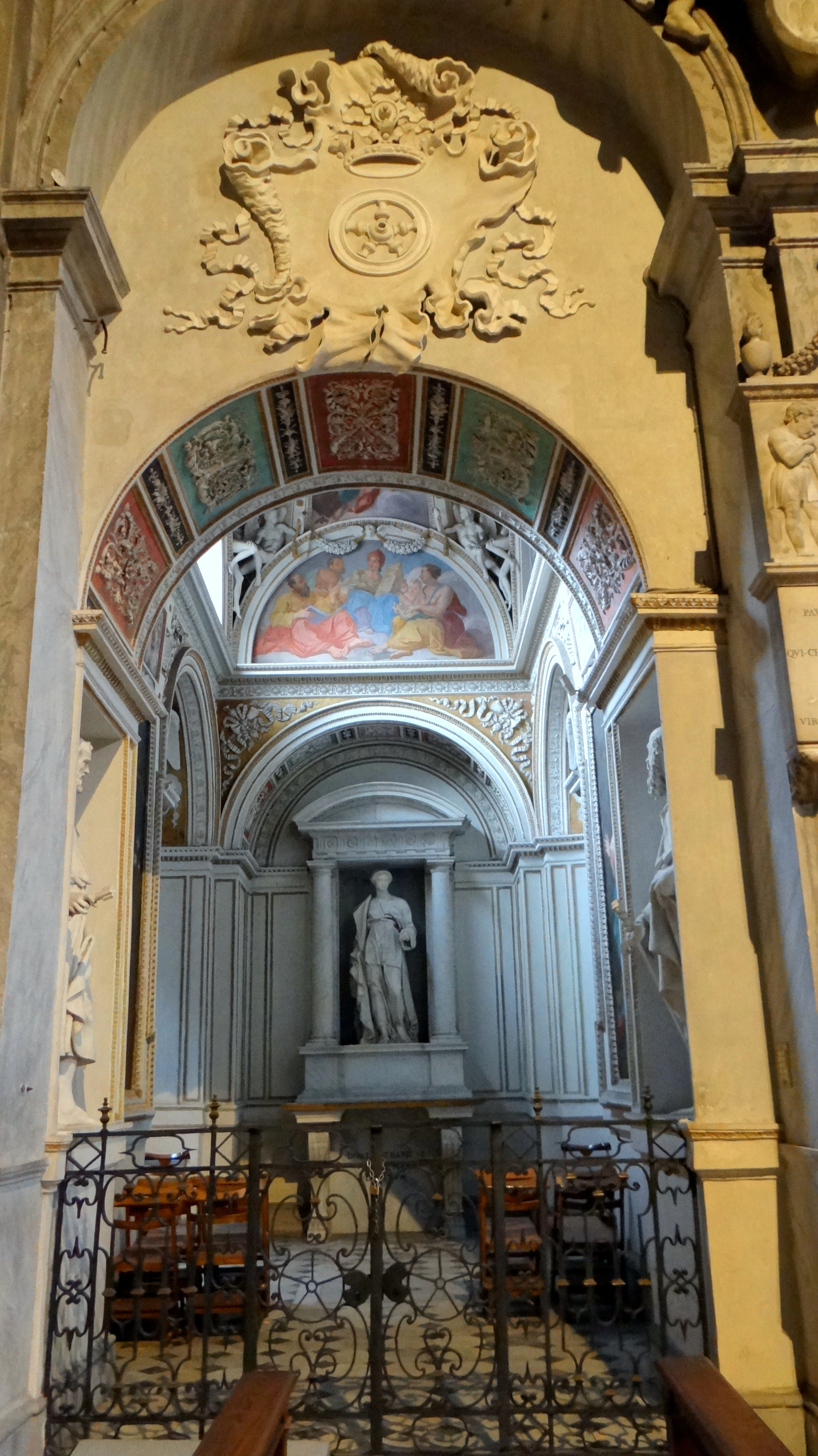
The entrance arch with the Theodoli coat-of-arms.

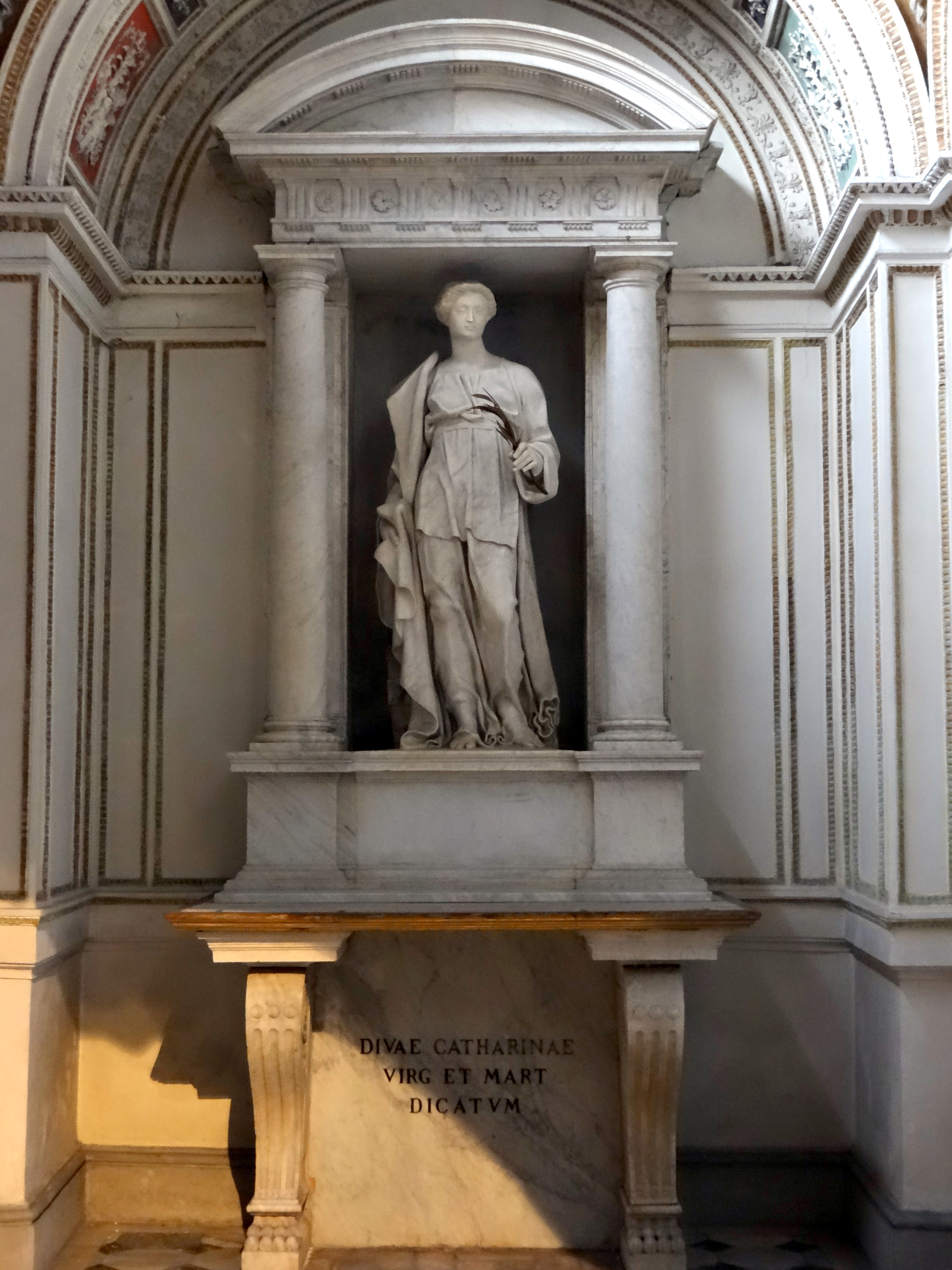
The statue of Saint Catherine.

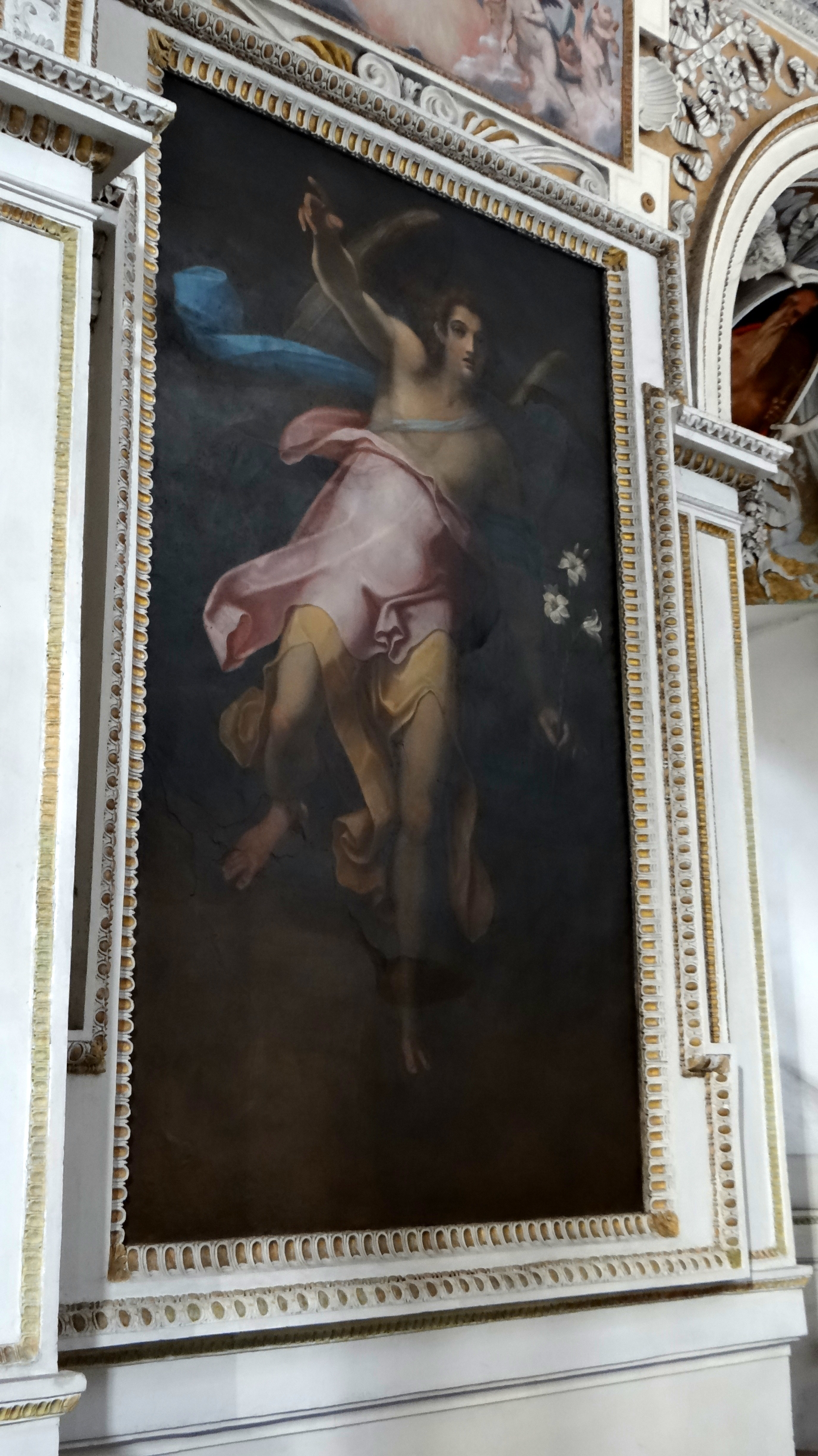
The Angel of the Annunciation by Giulio Mazzoni.

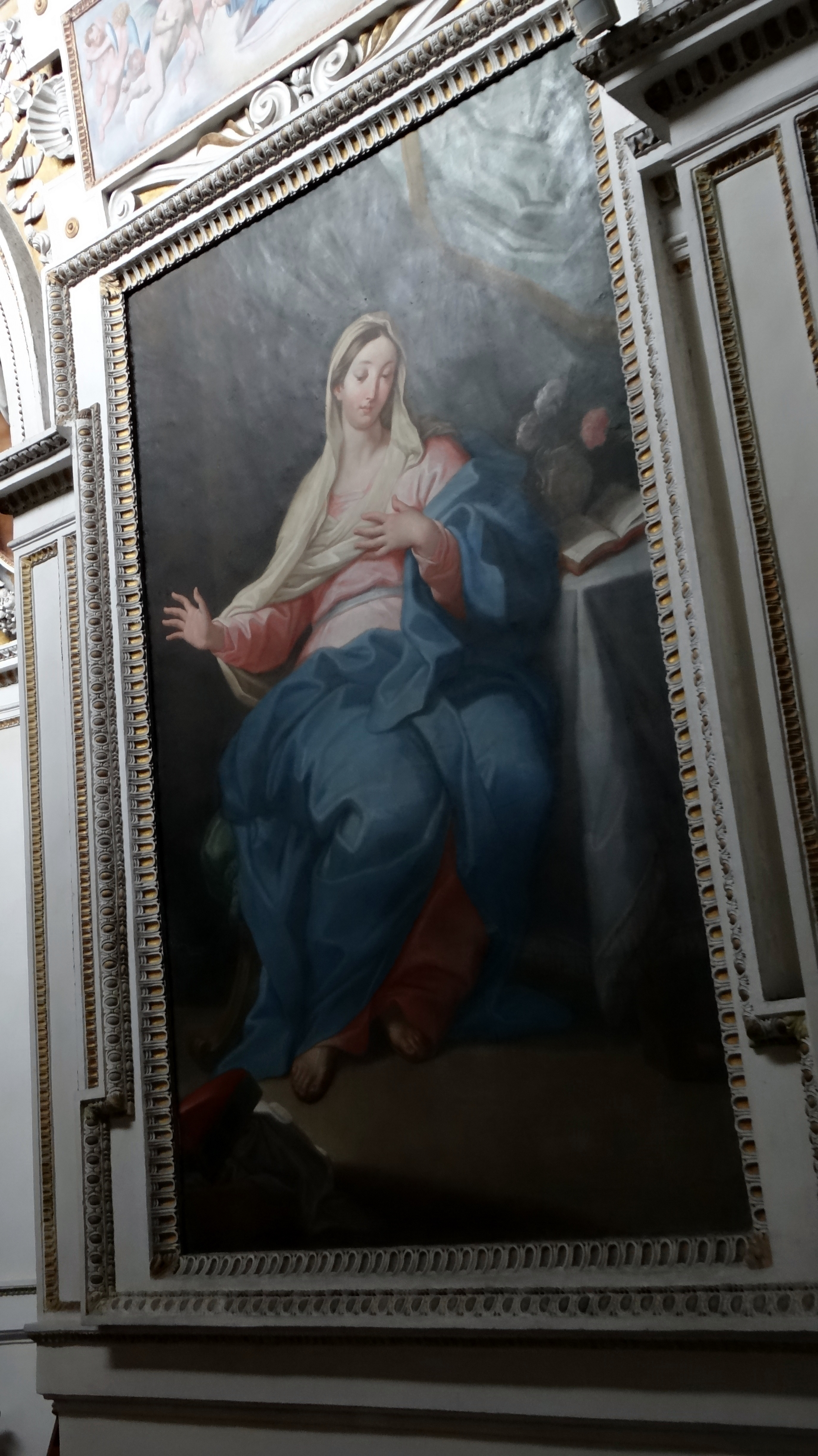
The Virgin of the Annunciation by Giacomo Triga.

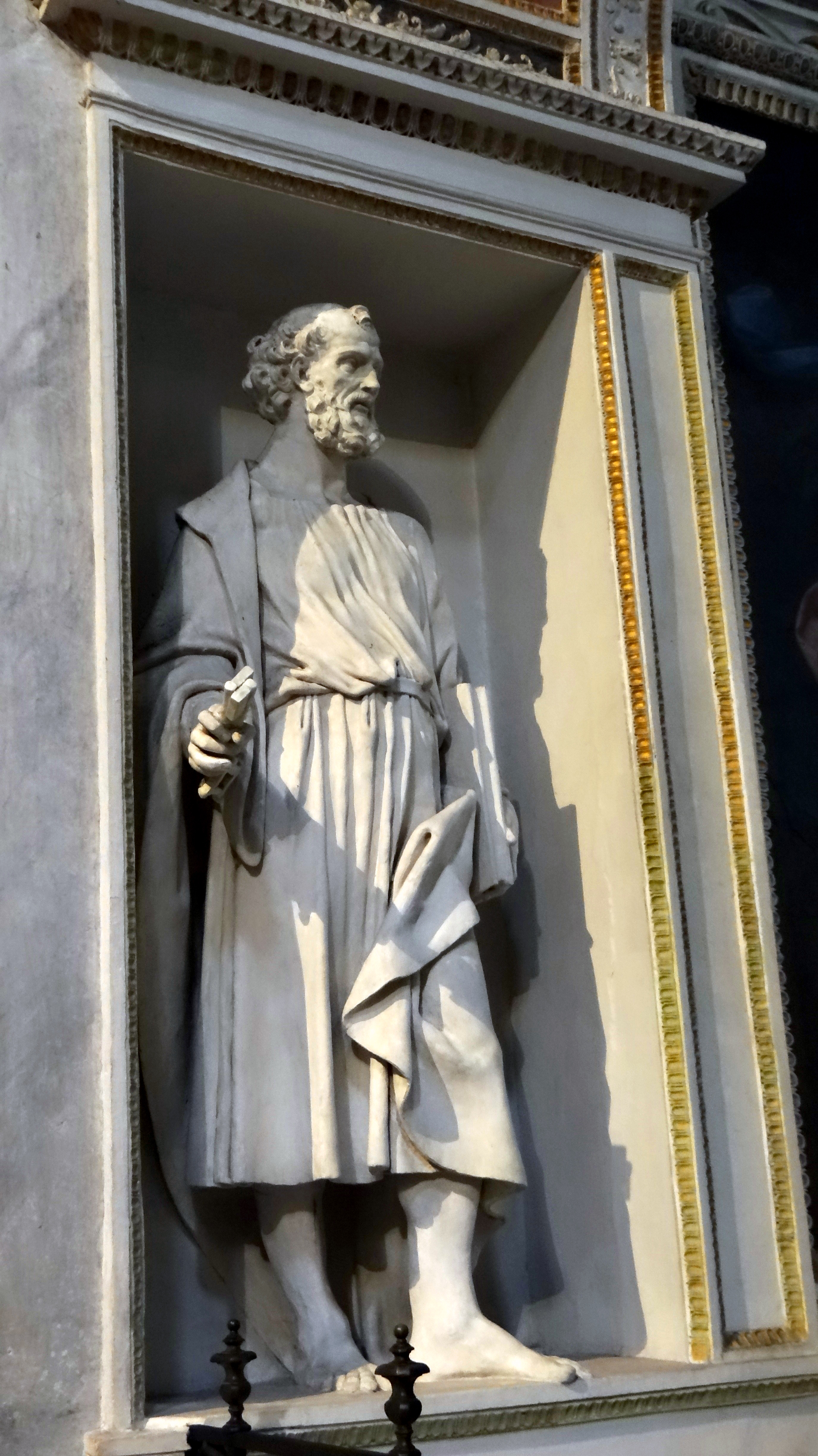
The plaster statue of Saint Peter.

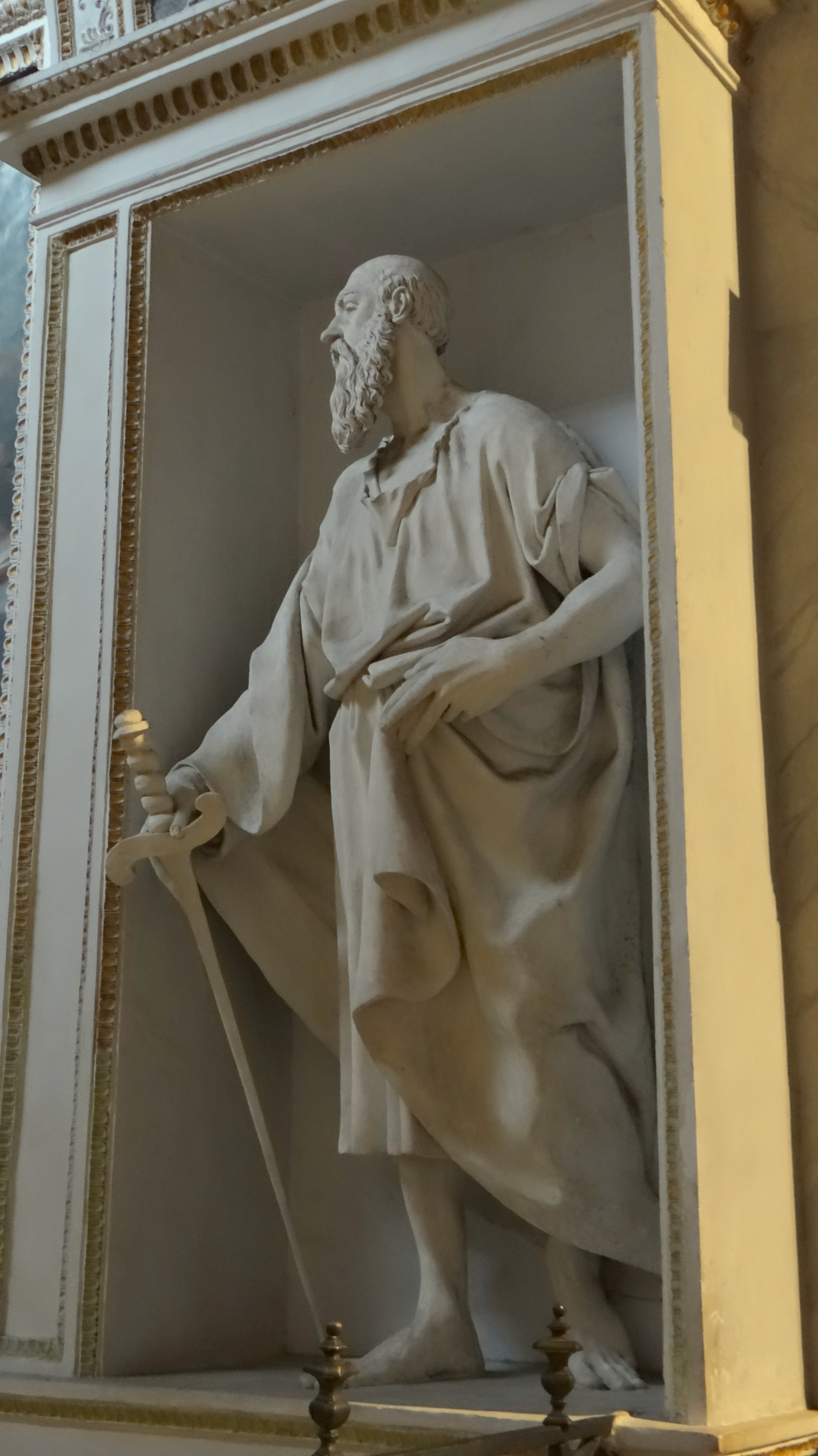
The plaster statue of Saint Paul.

== Bibliography ==
- Patrizia Tosini: La cappella Alicorni Theodoli e la decorazione di Giulio Mazzoni da Piacenza, in I. Miarelli Mariani, M. Richiello (a cura di), Santa Maria del Popolo. Storia e restauri, 2 voll., Poligrafico dello Stato, Roma 2009, II, pp. 489–507
