= Giulio Mazzoni =

Italian painter

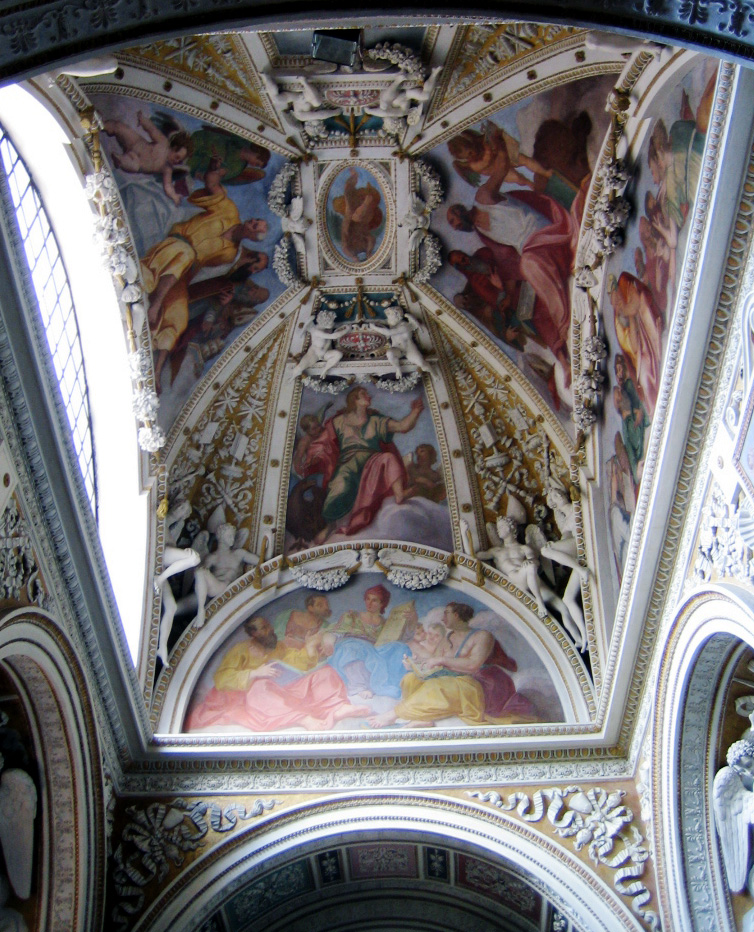
The ceiling of the Theodoli chapel at the basilica of Santa Maria del Popolo in Rome, Italy, containing stuccoes by Giulio Mazzoni

Giulio Mazzoni (1525–1618) was an Italian painter and stuccoist, active during the Renaissance period. He was born in Piacenza, but studied in Rome under Daniele da Volterra, and was active about the year 1568. He helped decorate the Palazzo Spada. He also painted a canvas of the Four Evangelists for the Cathedral of Piacenza.

One of the major works in his oeuvre is the Theodoli Chapel in the Basilica of Santa Maria del Popolo which is a gem of Roman Mannerism. Mazzoni was commissioned by Traiano Alicorni in 1555 to decorate his chapel in the basilica. The work was restarted by a new patron, Girolamo Theodoli, the Bishop of Cádiz after 1569 and finished around 1575. Mazzoni created a harmonious and iconographically coherent ensemble of delicate stuccos, frescos and paintings with the classicising statue of Saint Catherine in the focus of the space.

He was probably related to the sculptor Guido Mazzoni.

== Bibliography ==
- Bryan, Michael (1889). Walter Armstrong & Robert Edmund Graves (ed.). Dictionary of Painters and Engravers, Biographical and Critical. Vol. II L-Z. London: George Bell and Sons. pp. 127–128.
- Arturo, Pettorelli (1922). Giulio Mazzoni de Piacenza, Pittore e Scultore. Rome: Alfieri & Lacroix.

Attribution:
