= Gerolamo Theodoli =

Marchese Gerolamo (or Girolamo) Theodoli (1677–17 October 1766) was an Italian nobleman and architect, best known for designing the Teatro Argentina in Rome.

== Life ==
Gerolamo Theodoli was born in Rome in 1677 to Carlo and Francesca Sacchetti Theodoli, the last descendant of the Roman branch of the Marquises of San Vito. The Theodolis were originally from Forli. Cardinal Mario Theodoli was his great-uncle. He was also related to Pope Innocent XIII. His sister Flavia married Ferdinando Bolognetti, of the lords of Vicovaro.

In 1697, he succeeded his father as Marquis of San Vito and Earl of Ciciliano. In the spring of 1709, at the request of Pope Clement XI, he was among the knights accompanying Frederick IV of Denmark during his visit to Rome.

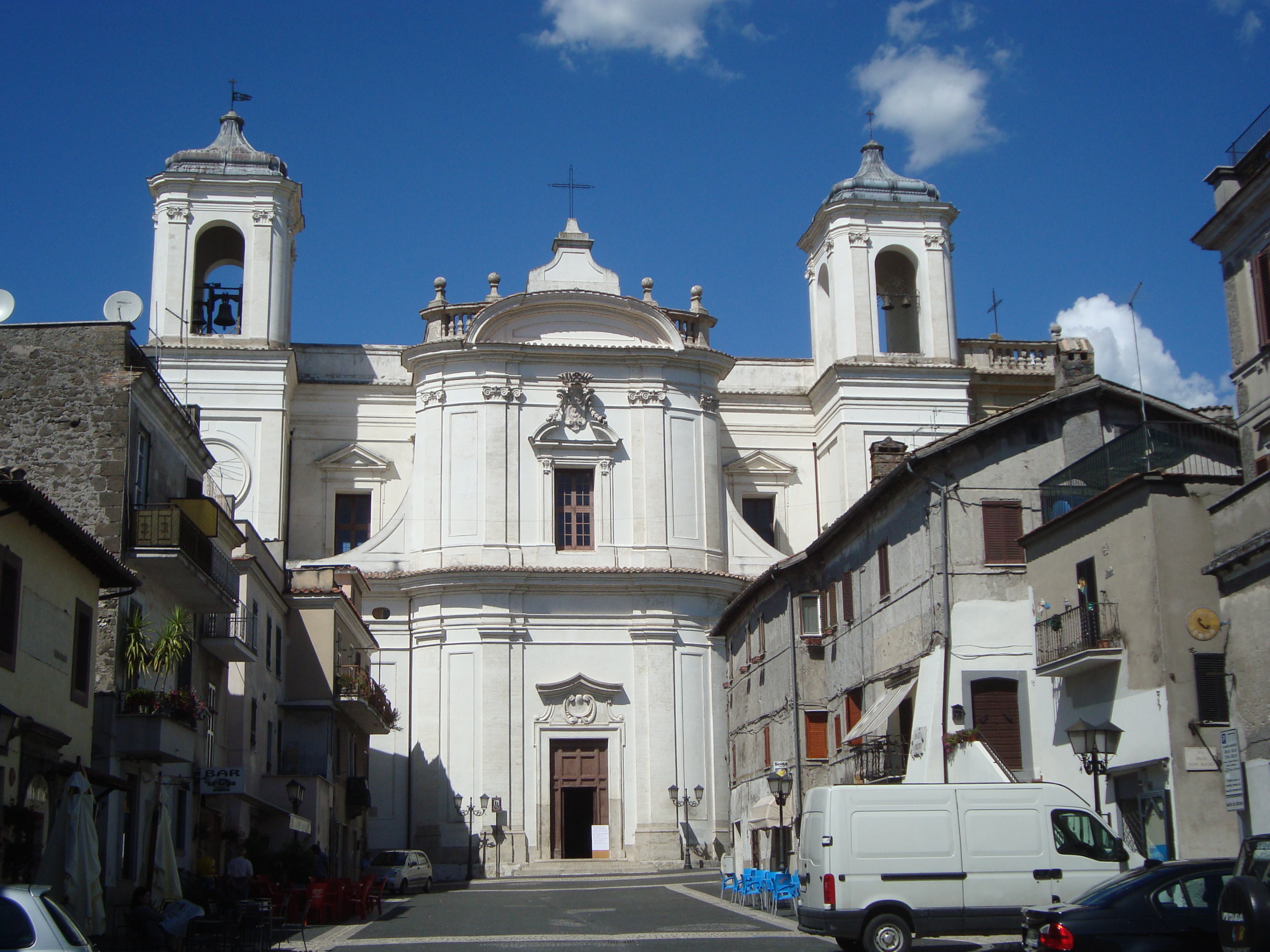
Eglise San Pietro Apostolo de Vicovaro

Theodoli was a member of the literary society Accademia degli Arcadi. Interested in poetry, theater and music, he wrote sonnets and theatrical comedies. He was also a member of the Accademia di San Luca, where one of his students was Giovanni Antinori.

Theodoli refurbished the family chapel in S. Maria del Popolo. Giacomo Triga, his court painter, restored and refreshed the paintings.

== Architect ==
In 1715, he designed the bell tower for S. Biagio in San Vito Romano. He also designed the bell tower for Santa Maria dei Miracoli, and the church of San Pietro at Vicovaro, near Tivoli for his nephew, Giacomo Bolognetti. He was commissioned by Pope Clement XII to manage the restoration of the Porta San Paolo. Theodoli did not receive payment for his work as an architect.

In 1731, he designed the Teatro Argentina with the auditorium laid out in the traditional horseshoe shape. In 1751, he undertook the reconstruction of Santi Marcellino e Pietro al Laterano.

At Ciciliano, children playing with a ball hit a wall so hard that it dislodged some of the facing to reveal a fresco of the Virgin Mary. Theodoli built S. Maria della Palla (It. palla/ball) to house the image. It was completed in 1759.

He died in Rome on October 10, 1766; he was buried in the family chapel in S. Maria del Popolo.

== See also ==
- Theodoli Chapel (Santa Maria del Popolo)

== Bibliography ==
- Spesso, Marco, "Gerolamo Theodoli", in Bulzoni (ed.), La cultura architettonica a Roma nel secolo XVIII (Roma, 1991; br., pp. 244, 16 ill., cm 17x24 - Arte, architettura, urbanistica series), ISBN 88-7119-348-2
