= Augusto Theodoli =

Italian prelate

His Eminence Augusto Theodoli
- Cardinal-Deacon of Santa Maria della Scala
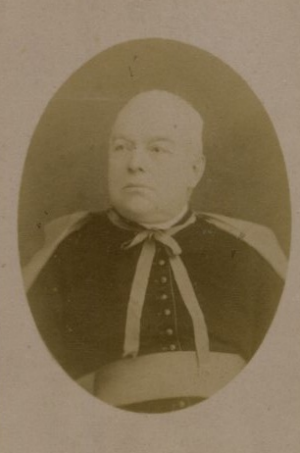
- Theodoli in 1885.
- Church: Roman Catholic Church
- Appointed: 10 June 1886
- Term ended: 22 January 1897
- Predecessor: Pietro Lasagni
- Successor: Girolamo Maria Gotti

Orders
- Created cardinal: 7 June 1886 by Pope Leo XIII
- Rank: Cardinal-Deacon

Personal details
- Born: Augusto Theodoli; 18 September 1819 Rome, Papal States
- Died: 26 June 1892 (aged 72) Rome, Kingdom of Italy
- Buried: Campo Verano
- Parents: Giacomo Theodoli; Maria Camassei
- Motto: Vicissim incumbimus victoriæ

Augusto Theodoli (18 September 1819 – 26 June 1892) was an Italian prelate of the Catholic Church who, as the son of a noble family, filled assignments that associated him closely with the papal household, ceremonies, and basilicas. He became a cardinal in 1889.

== Biography ==
Augustine Theobaldi was born in Rome on 18 September 1819, into a noble family. He was related to Cardinal Mario Theodoli (1601–1650). Though his behavior when young would not have suggested it, he chose a clerical career.

During the reign of Pope Gregory XVI, he became a canon of Santa Maria Maggiore. Under Pope Pius IX, in 1847, he became a canon of the Lateran Basilica. In 1850, he was charged with delivering the red biretta to the new Cardinal Maximilian Sommerau-Beeckh, archbishop of Olmutz, in Vienna.

He was relator of the Sacred Consulta from 1856 to 1866 and became auditor of the Apostolic Signatura on 26 January 1866.

On 9 June 1866, he became financial secretary of the Congregation of the Reverend Fabric of St. Peter, the curial department responsible for the maintenance and decoration of St. Peter's Basilica. In that position, he played a role in organizing the celebration of the 18th centennial of the martyrdom of Saints Peter and Paul, the First Vatican Council, the restoration of the colonnade, the replating with lead of the dome, and the renovation of the chapel of the Most Blessed Sacrament and the choir.

In 1874, while he was on holiday outside Rome at Certosa di Trisulti, he was captured by bandits and had to pay a large ransom to secure his release.

On 30 March 1882, he was appointed majordomo and prefect of the Pontifical Palaces. Pope Leo XIII created him a cardinal deacon in the consistory of 7 June 1886; and Theodoli received his red biretta and was assigned the deaconry of Santa Maria della Scala on 10 June 1886. On 18 March 1889, he was named a member of the Council for the Administration of the Patrimony of the Apostolic See.

He died in Rome on 26 June 1892 after a brief illness. He was buried in his family's tomb in Campo Verano cemetery.
