= Lily Conrad, Marchesa Theodoli =

American-Italian novelist

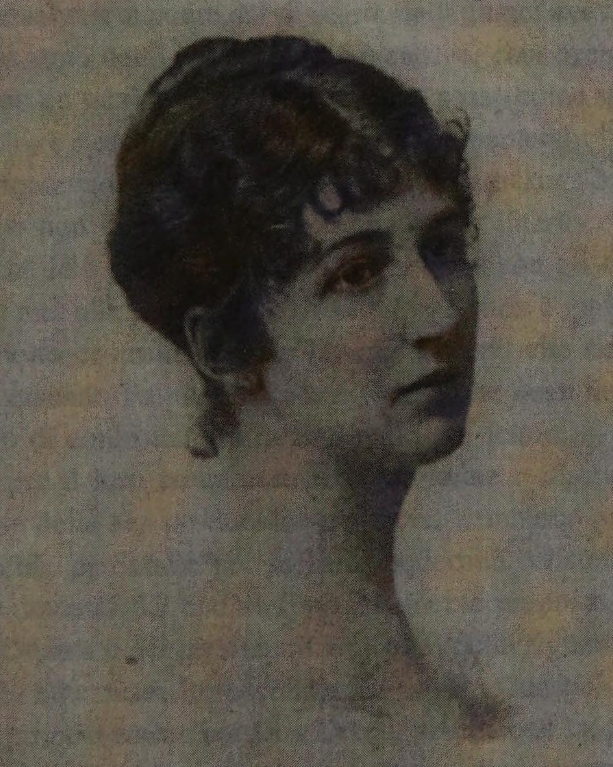
- Born: 1850; New Orleans
- Died: 1908 (aged 57–58); Rome
- Occupation: Novelist

Lily Conrad, Marchesa Theodoli (1850–1908) was an American-Italian novelist.

Lily Conrad was born in 1850 in New Orleans, the daughter of the Confederate officer William K. Conrad. After her father's death, she and her mother relocated to Rome, where her mother married the Marchese Francesco Cavalletti. Lily Conrad was educated at the Sacro Cuore della Trinità dei Monti.

In Rome, as a young woman Lily Conrad was pursued by many would-be suitors, including the novelist Frances Marion Crawford. One of those would-be suitors reportedly committed suicide by shooting himself in front of a portrait of her. In 1874, Conrad married the Marchese Alfonso Theodoli (1845–1910). They had two sons.

Lily Theodoli died in 1908 in Rome.

== Bibliography ==
- Under Pressure: Scenes from Roman Life. 2 vol. London: Macmillan, 1892.
- Candiduccia: Scenes from Roman Life. 2 vol. London: Kegan Paul, 1894.
