= Giuseppe Petrocchi =

Italian Catholic prelate (born 1948)

His Eminence Giuseppe Petrocchi
- Cardinal; Archbishop Emeritus of L'Aquila
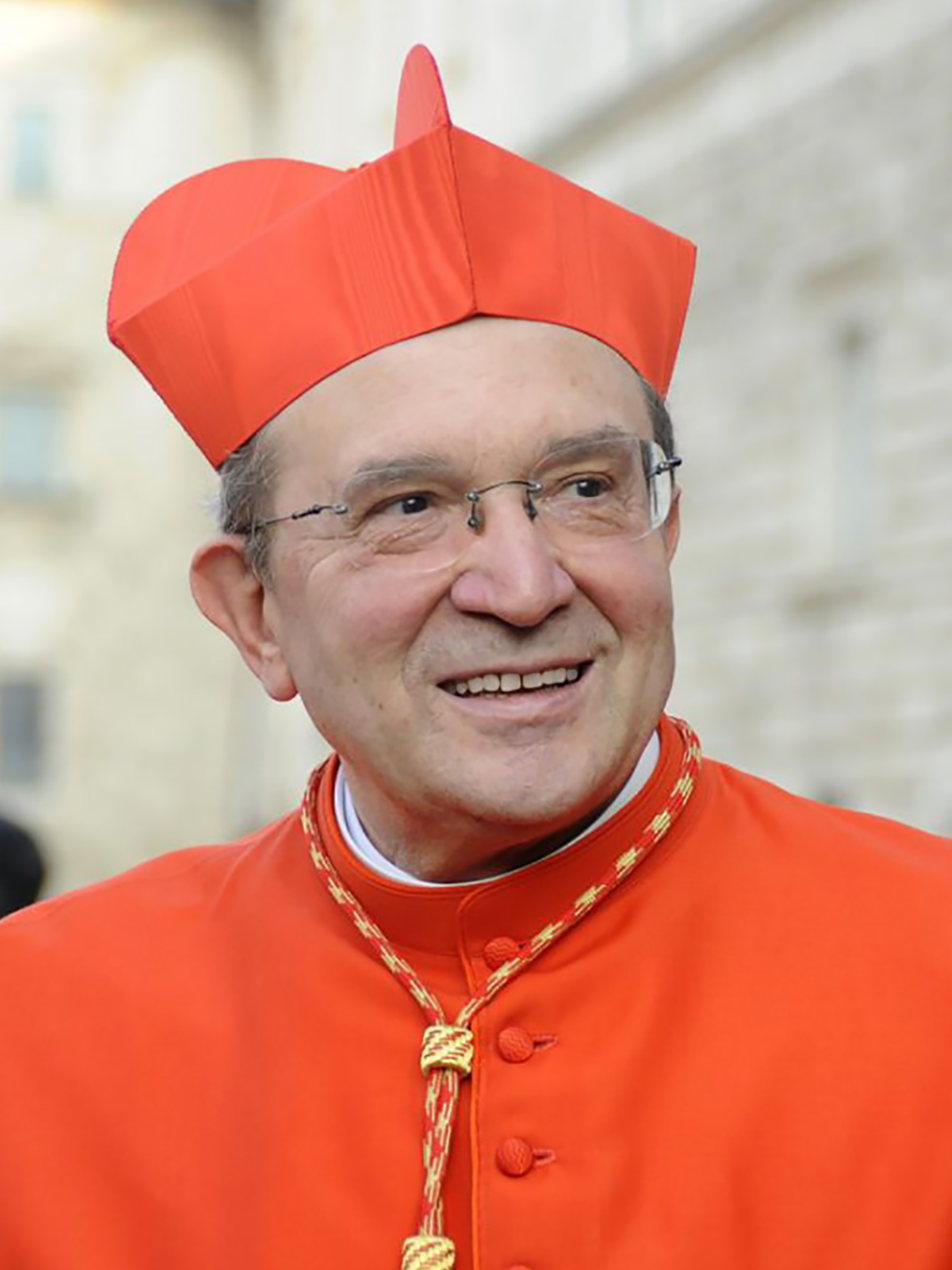
- Petrocchi in 2018
- Church: Catholic Church
- Archdiocese: L'Aquila
- See: L'Aquila
- Appointed: 8 June 2013
- Installed: 7 July 2013
- Term ended: 1 August 2024
- Predecessor: Giuseppe Molinari
- Successor: Antonio D'Angelo
- Other post: Cardinal-Priest of San Giovanni Battista dei Fiorentini (2018–)
- Previous post: Bishop of Latina-Terracina-Sezze-Priverno (1998–2013)

Orders
- Ordination: 14 September 1973 by Marcello Morgante
- Consecration: 20 September 1998 by Silvano Montevecchi
- Created cardinal: 28 June 2018 by Pope Francis
- Rank: Cardinal-Priest

Personal details
- Born: Giuseppe Petrocchi; 19 August 1948 (age 78) Ascoli Piceno, Italy
- Education: Pontifical Roman Major Seminary; Pontifical Lateran University; Sapienza University of Rome; University of Macerata
- Motto: Ante omnia caritas (Above all, love)
- Coat of arms

Giuseppe Petrocchi (born 19 August 1948) is an Italian Catholic prelate who served as Archbishop of L'Aquila from 2013 to 2024. Pope Francis made him a cardinal on 28 June 2018.

== Life ==
Giuseppe Petrocchi was born on 19 August 1948 in Ascoli Piceno.

Petrocchi commenced his ecclesial studies in his home diocese on 4 October 1965 where he finished his high school education before being sent to the Pontifico Seminario Romano Maggiore in September 1967. He completed his studies at the Lateran where he obtained a bachelor's degree before pursuing further studies at Sapienza University of Rome and at the University of Macerata.

He was ordained to the priesthood on 14 September 1973 in the church of San Pietro Martire and began work as a teacher and pastor. Pope John Paul II appointed him Bishop of Latina-Terracina-Sezze-Priverno on 27 June 1998 and he received episcopal consecration the following 20 September in Ascoli Piceno from Bishop Silvano Montevecchi, the co-consecrators being Bishops Domenico Pecile and Marcello Morgante. He took possession of his diocese on 18 October.

He was appointed Archbishop of L'Aquila on 8 June 2013, took possession the following month, and received the pallium from the Pope on 29 June 2013 in Saint Peter's Basilica. On 28 June 2018 Pope Francis made Archbishop Petrocchi a cardinal, assigning him the titular church of San Giovanni Battista dei Fiorentini.

On 22 September 2018 Petrocchi was appointed a member of the Pontifical Commission for Vatican City State, of the Congregation for Catholic Education on 6 October 2018, and of the Congregation for the Causes of Saints on 27 April 2019. In April 2020 he was appointed to head a second commission that was to study the question of the ordination of women to the diaconate.

Pope Francis accepted his resignation as archbishop on 1 August 2024.

He participated as a cardinal elector in the 2025 papal conclave that elected Pope Leo XIV.

== See also ==
- Cardinals created by Francis

Catholic Church titles
| Preceded by Domenico Pecile | Bishop of Latina-Terracina-Sezze-Priverno; 27 June 1998 – 8 June 2013 | Succeeded by Mariano Crociata |
| Preceded by Giuseppe Molinari | Archbishop of L'Aquila; 8 June 2013 – 1 August 2024 | Succeeded by Antonio D'Angelo |
| Preceded by Carlo Caffarra | Cardinal-Priest of San Giovanni Battista dei Fiorentini; 28 June 2018 – present | Incumbent |
