= De Noya =

De Noya is a surname. Notable people with the surname include:

- Belkisyole Alarcón de Noya (born 1952), Venezuelan medic
- Nicolás de Noya (died 1511), Italian prelate
- Roberto de Noya (died 1515), Italian prelate
