= Delio Lucarelli =

Italian Roman Catholic prelate (1939–2024)

- Bishop Emertus of Rieti
- Appointed: 30 November 1996
- Term ended: 15 May 2015
- Predecessor: Giuseppe Molinari
- Successor: Domenico Pompili

Orders
- Ordination: 29 June 1965 by Vincenzo Del Signore
- Consecration: 6 January 1997 by Pope John Paul II

Personal details
- Born: 24 November 1939 Fano, Italy
- Died: 29 January 2024 (aged 84) Rieti, Italy
- Motto: In verbo tuo
- Coat of arms

Styles of Delio Lucarelli
- Reference style: His Excellency; The Most Reverend
- Spoken style: Your Excellency
- Religious style: Bishop

Delio Lucarelli (24 November 1939 – 29 January 2024) was an Italian Roman Catholic prelate. He served as bishop of Rieti from 1997 to 2015.

== Early life and ordination ==
Lucarelli was born in Fano, an episcopal seat in the province of Pesaro and Urbino, on 24 November 1939. He studied at the Pontifical Marche Regional Seminary "Pio XI" in Fano. On 29 June 1965, Lucarelli was ordained a priest by Bishop Vincenzo Del Signore. After ordination he carried out his pastoral work as parochial vicar in Lucrezia, where he remained from 1965 to 1967, and San Michele al Fiume, a hamlet of Mondavio, from 1967 to 1970. In that year, he was appointed educator and animator at the regional seminary of Fano, where he then held the position of pro-rector and subsequently rector, from 1972 to 1988. On 13 June 1978, he received the honorary title of Chaplain of His Holiness from Pope Paul VI. In 1988, he was appointed general secretary for Italy of the Pontifical Society of Saint Peter the Apostle.

== Bishop ==
On 30 November 1996, Lucarelli was appointed by Pope John Paul II as bishop of Rieti; he succeeded Giuseppe Molinari, previously appointed coadjutor archbishop of L'Aquila. On 6 January 1997, he received episcopal consecration, in St. Peter's Basilica in Vatican City, through the imposition of the hands of the pontiff himself, co-consecrating archbishops Giovanni Battista Re and Myroslav Marusyn. On 2 February, he took possession of the diocese. On 4 December 2002, Lucarelli called the diocesan synod; having concluded the work, and on 2 February 2006, he promulgated the synod book. Lucarelli resigned from his position due to the fact that he had reached the age limit, from the pastoral governance of the diocese of Rieti, which was accepted by Pope Francis on 15 May 2015. He was succeeded by Domenico Pompili, of the clergy of Anagni-Alatri, until then undersecretary of the Italian Episcopal Conference. He remained apostolic administrator of the diocese until the entry of his successor on 5 September.

== Death ==
Lucarelli died on 29 January 2024, at the age of 84.

Catholic Church titles
Preceded by Giuseppe Molinari	Bishop of Rieti; 1997–2015	Succeeded by Domenico Pompili
