= Carlo de Angelis =

Italian Roman Catholic prelate

Most Reverend Carlo de Angelis
- Bishop of Acerra
- Church: Catholic Church
- Diocese: Diocese of Acerra
- In office: 1674–1690
- Predecessor: Placido Carafa
- Successor: Carolus de Tilly
- Previous post: Bishop of L'Aquila (1663–1674)

Orders
- Consecration: 26 August 1663 by Francesco Maria Brancaccio

Personal details
- Born: 1620 Naples, Italy
- Died: September 1690 (age 70) Acerra, Italy

Carlo de Angelis (1620 – September 1690) was a Roman Catholic prelate who served as Bishop of Acerra (1674–1690) and Bishop of L'Aquila (1663–1674).

== Biography ==
Carlo de Angelis was born in Naples, Italy in 1620. On 26 January 1663, he was selected as Bishop of L'Aquila and confirmed by Pope Alexander VII on 13 August 1663. On 26 August 1663, he was consecrated bishop by Francesco Maria Brancaccio, Bishop of Viterbo e Tuscania, with Giovanni Antonio Capobianco, Bishop of Siracusa, serving as co-consecrator. On 8 July 1674, he was selected as Bishop of Acerra and confirmed by Pope Clement X on 17 December 1674. He served as Bishop of Acerra until his death in September 1690.

== External links and additional sources ==
- Cheney, David M. "Diocese of Acerra". Catholic-Hierarchy.org. (for Chronology of Bishops) ^{[self-published]}
- Chow, Gabriel. "Diocese of Acerra (Italy)". GCatholic.org. (for Chronology of Bishops) ^{[self-published]}
- Cheney, David M. "Archdiocese of L'Aquila". Catholic-Hierarchy.org. (for Chronology of Bishops) ^{[self-published]}
- Chow, Gabriel. "Metropolitan Archdiocese of L'Aquila". GCatholic.org. (for Chronology of Bishops) ^{[self-published]}

Catholic Church titles
Preceded by Francesco Tello de León	Bishop of L'Aquila; 1663–1674	Succeeded by Giovanni de Torrecilla y Cárdenas
Preceded by Placido Carafa	Bishop of Acerra; 1674–1690	Succeeded by Carolus de Tilly
