= Salvatore Giovanni Rinaldi =

Italian Roman Catholic bishop

- Bishop Emeritus of Acerra
- Church: Catholic Church
- Diocese: Diocese of Acerra
- In office: 7 December 1999 – 18 September 2013
- Predecessor: Antonio Riboldi
- Successor: Antonio Di Donna

Orders
- Ordination: 2 July 1961 by Adolfo Binni
- Consecration: 29 January 2000 by Michele Giordano

Personal details
- Born: 3 May 1937 (age 89) Cimitile, Province of Naples, Kingdom of Italy

Salvatore Giovanni Rinaldi (born 3 May 1937 in Cimitile) is a retired Italian Roman Catholic bishop.

Ordained to the priesthood in 1961, Rinaldi was named bishop of the Roman Catholic Diocese of Acerra, Italy in 2002 and retired on 18 September 2013.
