= León Cortés =

León Cortés may refer to:

- León Cortés Castro (canton), a canton in San José Province, Costa Rica
- León Cortés Castro, politician from Costa Rica

== See also ==
- Leon Còrdas
- Leone Cortese
- Leon Cortez
