= Marcello d'Aste =

16th-century Catholic cardinal

His Eminence Marcello d'Aste
- Cardinal-Priest of Santi Silvestro e Martino ai Monti; Archbishop (Personal Title) of Ancona e Numana
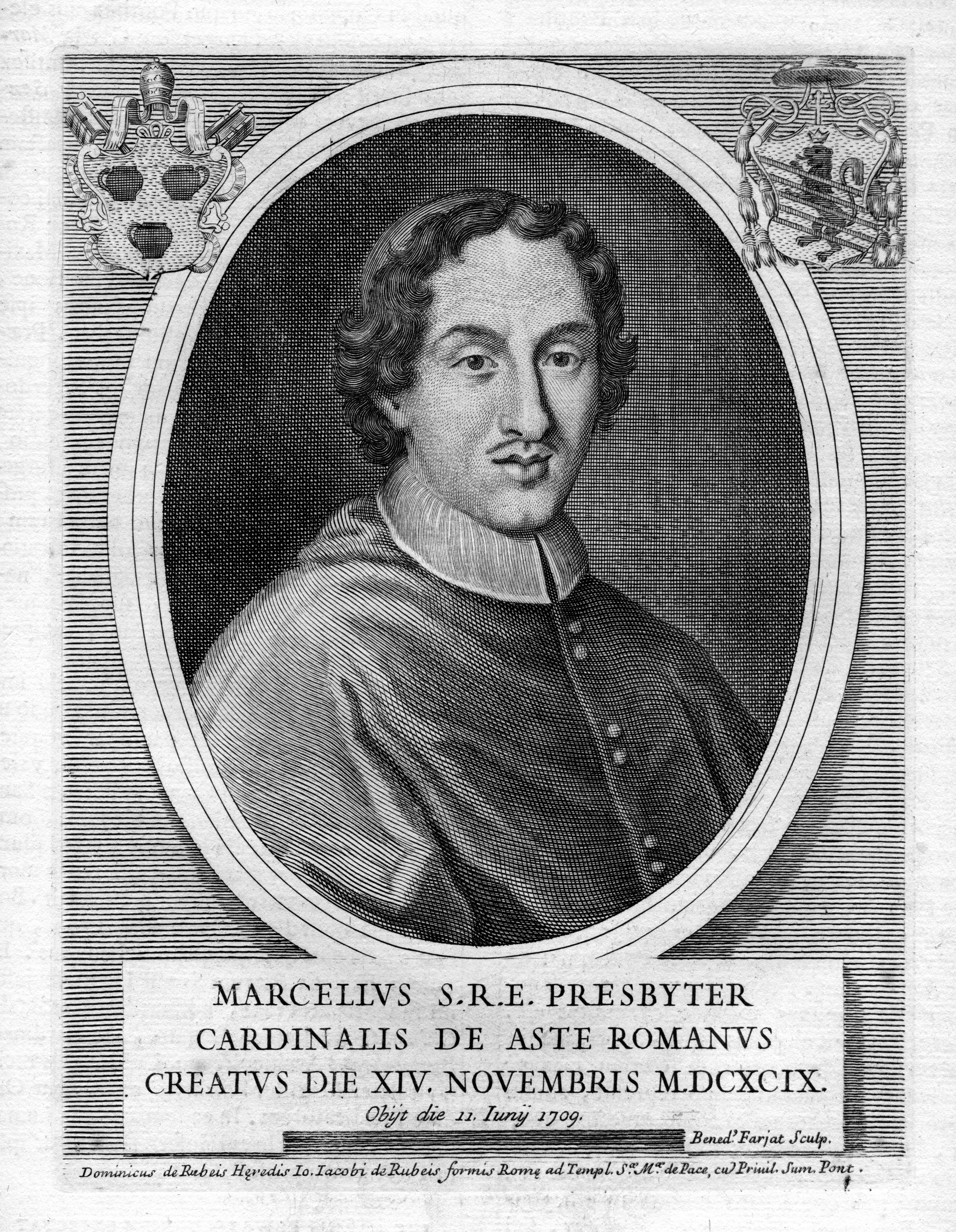
- Engraving of d'Aste by Benoît Farjat
- Church: Catholic Church

Orders
- Consecration: 13 Jan 1692 by Galeazzo Marescotti

Personal details
- Born: 21 Jul 1657 Aversa, Italy
- Died: 11 Jun 1709 (age 51)

Marcello d'Aste (1657–1709) was a Roman Catholic cardinal.

== Biography ==
On 13 Jan 1692, he was consecrated bishop by Galeazzo Marescotti, Cardinal-Priest of Santi Quirico e Giulitta, with Giuseppe Bologna, Archbishop of Capua, and Stefano Giuseppe Menatti, Titular Bishop of Cyrene, serving as co-consecrators.

== Episcopal succession ==
Episcopal succession of Marcello d'Aste

While bishop, he was the principal consecrator of:

- Ulrich von Federspiel, Bishop of Chur (1693);

and the principal co-consecrator of:

- Andrea Deodati, Archbishop of Rossano (1697);
- Giuseppe Rodoero, Bishop of Acerra (1697);
- Luigi Ruzini, Bishop of Bergamo (1698); and
- Pietro Spínola, Bishop of Ajaccio (1698);

Catholic Church titles
Preceded by Francesco Boccapaduli	Titular Archbishop of Athenae; 1691–1700	Succeeded by Filippo Antonio Gualtieri
Preceded by Bartolomeo Menatti	Apostolic Nuncio to Switzerland; 1692–1695	Succeeded by Michelangelo dei Conti
Preceded by	Secretary of the Congregation of Bishops and Regulars; 1695–1698	Succeeded by
Preceded by Giannicolò Conti	Archbishop (Personal Title) of Ancona e Numana; 1700–1709	Succeeded by Giovanni Battista Bussi
Preceded by Opizio Pallavicini	Cardinal-Priest of Santi Silvestro e Martino ai Monti; 1700–1709	Succeeded by Giuseppe Maria Tomasi di Lampedusa
