= Azzano Decimo =

Azzano Decimo Dassan (Friulian)
- Comune
- Comune di Azzano Decimo
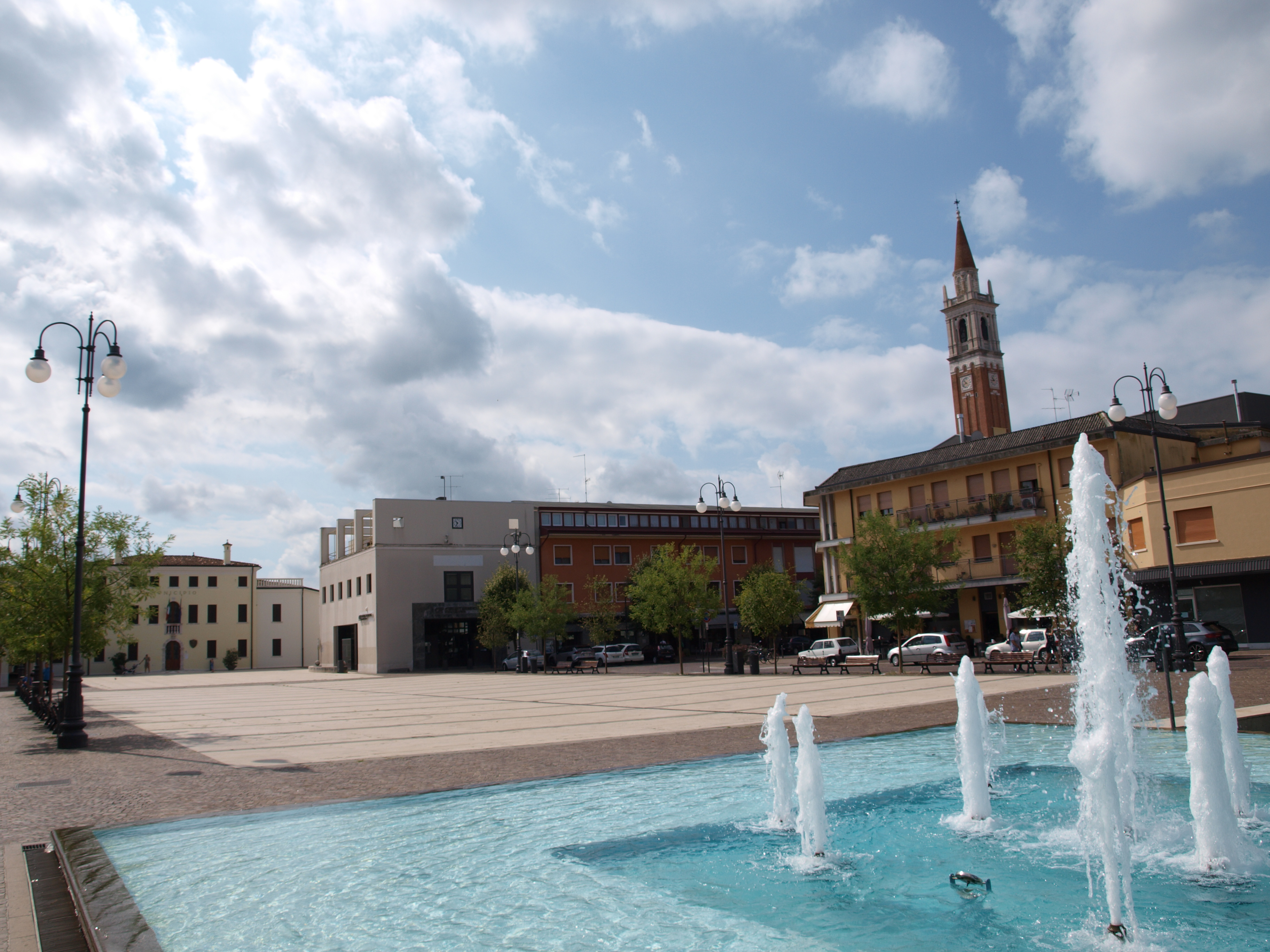

- Location within Italy Location within Friuli-Venezia Giulia
- Coordinates: 45°53′N 12°43′E
- Country: Italy
- Region: Friuli-Venezia Giulia
- Province: Pordenone (PN)
- Frazioni: Corva, Fagnigola, Tiezzo

Area
  - Total: 51.4 km^{2} (19.8 sq mi)
- Elevation: 14 m (46 ft)

Population (Dec. 2004)
  - Total: 13,711
  - Density: 267/km^{2} (691/sq mi)
- Demonym: Azzanesi
- Time zone: UTC+1 (CET)
  - Summer (DST): UTC+2 (CEST)
- Postal code: 33082
- Dialing code: 0434
- Website: Official website

Azzano Decimo (Western Friulian: Dassan) is a comune (municipality) in the regional decentralization entity of Pordenone, in the Italian region of Friuli-Venezia Giulia, located about 90 kilometres (56 mi) northwest of Trieste and about 11 kilometres (7 mi) southeast of Pordenone. As of 31 December 2004, it had a population of 13,711 and an area of 51.4 square kilometres (19.8 mi^{2}).

The municipality of Azzano Decimo contains the frazioni (boroughs) of Corva, Fagnigola, and Tiezzo.

Azzano Decimo borders the following municipalities: Chions, Fiume Veneto, Pasiano di Pordenone, Pordenone, Pravisdomini.

== Demographic evolution ==
Historical population

Year	Pop.	±%
1861	?	—
1871	5,121	—
1881	5,567	+8.7%
1901	6,976	+25.3%
1911	9,750	+39.8%

Year	Pop.	±%
1921	10,826	+11.0%
1931	10,488	−3.1%
1936	9,808	−6.5%
1951	9,506	−3.1%
1961	8,714	−8.3%

Year	Pop.	±%
1971	9,413	+8.0%
1981	11,516	+22.3%
1991	11,949	+3.8%
2001	12,880	+7.8%

Source: Data from ISTAT

== People ==
- Hubert Badanai (1895–1986), Canadian automobile dealer and politician
- Mario Peressin (1923–1999), Archbishop of L'Aquila from 1983 to 1998
