= Carlo degli Ariosti =

Italian Roman Catholic prelate

Most Reverend Carlo degli Ariosti
- Bishop of Acerra
- Church: Catholic Church
- Diocese: Diocese of Acerra
- In office: 1527–1532
- Predecessor: Juan de Vich
- Successor: Gianvincenzo Carafa

Personal details
- Died: 1532 Acerra, Italy

Carlo degli Ariosti (died 1532) was a Roman Catholic prelate who served as Bishop of Acerra (1527–1532).

== Biography ==
On 28 January 1527, Carlo degli Ariosti was appointed during the papacy of Pope Clement VII as Bishop of Acerra. He served as Bishop of Acerra until his death in 1532.

== External links and additional sources ==
- Cheney, David M. "Diocese of Acerra". Catholic-Hierarchy.org. (for Chronology of Bishops) ^{[self-published]}
- Chow, Gabriel. "Diocese of Acerra (Italy)". GCatholic.org. (for Chronology of Bishops) ^{[self-published]}

Catholic Church titles
Preceded by Juan de Vich	Bishop of Acerra; 1527–1532	Succeeded by Gianvincenzo Carafa
