= Gianvincenzo Carafa =

Italian Roman Catholic bishop and cardinal

- Cardinal-Bishop of Palestrina
- Church: Catholic Church
- Diocese: Suburbicarian Diocese of Palestrina
- In office: 4 August 1539 – 28 August 1541
- Predecessor: Antonio Sanseverino
- Successor: Alessandro Cesarini
- Previous posts: Administrator of Anagni (1534-1541); Cardinal-Priest of Santa Maria in Trastevere (1537-1539); Administrator of Acerra (1535-1539); Cardinal-Priest of Santa Prisca (1537); Cardinal-Priest of Santa Pudenziana (1528-1537); Administrator of Anglona (1528-1536); Administrator of Acqui (1528-1534); Archbishop of Naples (1505-1530); Bishop of Rimini (1497-1505)

Orders
- Created cardinal: 21 November 1527 by Pope Clement VII

Personal details
- Born: 1477 Naples, Kingdom of Naples
- Died: 28 August 1541 (aged 63–64) Naples, Kingdom of Naples, Spanish Empire

Gianvincenzo Carafa (1477 – 28 August 1541) was an Italian Roman Catholic bishop and cardinal.

== Biography ==
A member of the della Stadera branch of the House of Carafa, Gianvincenzo Carafa was born in Naples in 1477, the son of Fabrizio Carafa, signore of Torre del Greco, and Aurelia Tolomei.

He was the half-nephew of Cardinal Oliviero Carafa.

Early in his career, he became a canon deacon of the cathedral chapter of Naples Cathedral.

On 13 September 1497 he was elected Bishop of Rimini. He was the administrator of the diocese until he reached the canonical age of 27; he was elevated to bishop on 1 April 1504, with dispensation for not yet reaching the canonical age. He occupied the see until 24 June 1530, when he resigned in favor of his nephew Francesco Carafa.

He participated in the Fifth Council of the Lateran (1512–17). Pope Julius II wanted to make him a cardinal but Ferdinand II of Aragon, who was then occupying the Kingdom of Naples, objected to the promotion of Neapolitans. Pope Leo X made him an Assistant at the Pontifical Throne. On 2 December 1521, during the sede vacante following the death of Pope Leo X, the College of Cardinals elected him governor of Rome; he occupied this post until 1522, when Pope Adrian VI was elected.

Pope Clement VII made him a cardinal priest in the consistory of 21 November 1527. He received the red hat and the titular church of Santa Pudenziana on 27 April 1528.

He was the administrator of the see of Anglona from 31 August 1528 to 6 September 1536, when he resigned in favor of his nephew Oliverio Carafa. He was Camerlengo of the Sacred College of Cardinals from 8 January 1533 to 9 January 1534.

He participated in the papal conclave of 1534 that elected Pope Paul III.

From 26 July 1535 until 21 April 1539 he was the administrator of the see of Acerra. He opted for the titular church of Santa Prisca on 23 July 1537, and for Santa Maria in Trastevere on 28 November 1537. On 4 August 1539 he opted for the order of cardinal bishops and received the suburbicarian see of Palestrina. When Pope Paul III went to Vicenza, Cardinal Carafa was legate a latere in Rome.

He died in Naples on 28 August 1541 and is buried in Naples Cathedral.

== See also ==
- Catholic Church in Italy

Catholic Church titles
Preceded by Oliviero Carafa	Bishop of Rimini; 1497–1505	Succeeded by Simone Bonadies
Preceded by Oliviero Carafa	Archbishop of Naples; 1505–1530	Succeeded by Francesco Carafa
Preceded by Matthäus Schinner	Cardinal-Priest of Santa Pudenziana; 1528–1537	Succeeded by Rodolfo Pio
Preceded by Giovanni Antonio Scotti	Administrator of Anglona; 1528–1536	Succeeded by Pietro Paolo Parisio
Preceded by Domenico Solino	Administrator of Acqui; 1528–1534	Succeeded by Pierre Van Der Worst
Preceded by Corrado Cerbaria	Administrator of Anagni; 1534–1541	Succeeded by Pedro Gómez Sarmiento de Villandrando
Preceded by Carlo degli Ariosti	Administrator of Acerra; 1535–1539	Succeeded by Pietro Paolo de Thisis
Preceded by Andrea Della Valle	Cardinal-Priest of Santa Prisca; 1537	Succeeded by Rodolfo Pio
Preceded by Antonio Sanseverino	Cardinal-Priest of Santa Maria in Trastevere; 1537–1539	Succeeded by Marino Grimani
Preceded by Angelo Capranica	Cardinal-Bishop of Palestrina; 1539–1541	Succeeded by Jean Balue
