= Vincenzo Pagano =

Italian Catholic prelate

Most Reverend Vincenzo Pagano
- Bishop of Acerra
- Church: Catholic Church
- Diocese: Diocese of Acerra
- In office: 1606–1644
- Predecessor: Juan Gurrea
- Successor: Mansueto Merati

Personal details
- Born: 1572 Naples, Italy
- Died: 1644 (age 72) Acerra, Italy

Vincenzo Pagano, C.R. (1572–1644) was a Catholic prelate who served as Bishop of Acerra (1606–1644).

== Biography ==
Vincenzo Pagano was born in Naples, Italy in 1572 and ordained a priest in the Congregation of Clerics Regular of the Divine Providence. On 20 November 1606, he was appointed during the papacy of Pope Paul V as Bishop of Acerra. He served as Bishop of Acerra until his death in 1644.

== External links and additional sources ==
- Cheney, David M. "Diocese of Acerra". Catholic-Hierarchy.org. (for Chronology of Bishops) ^{[self-published]}
- Chow, Gabriel. "Diocese of Acerra (Italy)". GCatholic.org. (for Chronology of Bishops) ^{[self-published]}

Catholic Church titles
Preceded by Juan Gurrea	Bishop of Acerra; 1606–1644	Succeeded by Mansueto Merati
