= Giovanni Battista del Tufo =

Italian Roman Catholic prelate

Most Reverend Giovanni Battista del Tufo
- Bishop of Acerra
- Church: Catholic Church
- Diocese: Diocese of Acerra
- In office: 1587–1603
- Predecessor: Marcello Maiorana
- Successor: Juan Gurrea

Orders
- Ordination: March 1572
- Consecration: 13 December 1587

Personal details
- Born: 1543 Naples, Italy
- Died: 13 June 1622 (age 79) Acerra, Italy

Giovanni Battista del Tufo, C.R. (1543 – 13 June 1622) was a Roman Catholic prelate who served as Bishop of Acerra (1587–1603).

== Biography ==
Giovanni Battista del Tufo was born in Naples, Italy in 1543 and ordained a deacon on 20 May 1570 and a priest in the Congregation of Clerics Regular of the Divine Providence in March 1572. On 17 August 1587, he was appointed during the papacy of Pope Sixtus V as Bishop of Acerra. On 13 December 1587, he was consecrated bishop. He served as Bishop of Acerra until his resignation on 23 June 1603. He died on 13 June 1622.

== Episcopal succession ==
While bishop, he was the principal co-consecrator of:

- Jerónimo Bernardo de Quirós, Bishop of Castellammare di Stabia (1601);
- Pietro Antonio Da Ponte, Bishop of Troia (1607);
- Timocrate Aloigi, Bishop of Cagli (1607);
- Fabrizio Degli Afflitti, Bishop of Boiano (1608);
- Girolamo Asteo, Bishop of Veroli (1608);
- Michael Consoli, Bishop of Sora (1609);
- François-Etienne Dulci, Archbishop of Avignon (1609);
- Pedro de Mata y Haro, Bishop of Belcastro (1609);
- Pedro Ruiz Valdivieso, Archbishop of Messina (1609);
- Giovanni Antonio Angrisani, Archbishop of Sorrento (1612);
- Pietro Emo, Titular Bishop of Larissa in Syria and Coadjutor Bishop of Crema (1612);
- Nicola Antonio Spinelli, Bishop of Alessano (1612);
- Fulvio Tesorieri, Bishop of Belcastro (1612);
- Muzio Vitali, Bishop of Vieste (1613);
- Girolamo Pignatelli, Archbishop of Rossano (1615);
- Vincenzo Periti, Bishop of Lavello (1615); and
- Achille Caracciolo, Bishop of Potenza (1616).

== External links and additional sources ==
- Cheney, David M. "Diocese of Acerra". Catholic-Hierarchy.org. (for Chronology of Bishops) ^{[self-published]}
- Chow, Gabriel. "Diocese of Acerra (Italy)". GCatholic.org. (for Chronology of Bishops) ^{[self-published]}

Catholic Church titles
Preceded by Marcello Maiorana	Bishop of Acerra; 1587–1603	Succeeded by Juan Gurrea
