= Vincenzo Lanfranchi =

Italian Catholic bishop (1609–1676)

Most Reverend Vincenzo Lanfranchi
- Archbishop of Acerenza e Matera
- Church: Catholic Church
- In office: 1665–1676
- Predecessor: Giambattista Spínola (seniore)
- Successor: Antonio del Río Colmenares

Orders
- Consecration: 17 May 1660 by Marcantonio Franciotti

Personal details
- Born: 1609 Naples, Italy
- Died: 6 Sep 1676 (age 67)

Vincenzo Lanfranchi, C.R. (1609–1676) was a Roman Catholic prelate who served as Archbishop of Acerenza e Matera (1665–1676) and Bishop of Trivento (1660–1665).

== Biography ==
Vincenzo Lanfranchi was born Naples, Italy in 1609 and ordained a priest in the Congregation of Clerics Regular of the Divine Providence. On 5 May 1660, he was appointed during the papacy of Pope Alexander VII as Bishop of Trivento. On 17 May 1660, he was consecrated bishop by Marcantonio Franciotti, Cardinal-Priest of Santa Maria della Pace, with Ottaviano Carafa, Titular Archbishop of Patrae, and Stefano Brancaccio, Titular Archbishop of Hadrianopolis in Haemimonto, serving as co-consecrators. On 7 Dec 1665, he was appointed during the papacy of Pope Alexander VII as Archbishop of Acerenza e Matera. He served as Archbishop of Acerenza e Matera until his death on 6 Sep 1676.

== External links and additional sources ==
- Cheney, David M. "Diocese of Trivento". Catholic-Hierarchy.org. (for Chronology of Bishops) ^{[self-published]}
- Chow, Gabriel. "Diocese of Trivento (Italy)". GCatholic.org. (for Chronology of Bishops) ^{[self-published]}
- Cheney, David M. "Archdiocese of Acerenza". Catholic-Hierarchy.org. (for Chronology of Bishops) ^{[self-published]}
- Chow, Gabriel. "Archdiocese of Acerenza (Italy)". GCatholic.org. (for Chronology of Bishops ^{[self-published]}

Catholic Church titles
Preceded by Giovanni Battista Ferruzzo	Bishop of Trivento; 1660–1665	Succeeded by Ambrogio Maria Piccolomini
Preceded by Giambattista Spínola (seniore)	Archbishop of Acerenza e Matera; 1665–1676	Succeeded by Antonio del Río Colmenares
