= Marcello Maiorana =

Italian Roman Catholic prelate

Most Reverend Marcello Maiorana
- Bishop of Acerra
- Church: Catholic Church
- Diocese: Diocese of Acerra
- In office: 1581–1586
- Predecessor: Scipione Salernitano
- Successor: Giovanni Battista del Tufo

Personal details
- Died: 13 November 1586 Acerra, Italy

Marcello Maiorana, C.R. (died 13 November 1586) was a Roman Catholic prelate who served as Bishop of Acerra (1581–1586) and Bishop of Crotone (1578–1581).

== Biography ==
Marcello Maiorana was ordained a priest in the Congregation of Clerics Regular of the Divine Providence. On 6 October 1578, he was appointed during the papacy of Pope Gregory XIII as Bishop of Crotone.

On 13 November 1581, he was transferred by Pope Gregory XIII to the diocese of Acerra. He served as Bishop of Acerra until his death on 13 November 1586.

While bishop, he was the principal co-consecrator of William Chisholm, Bishop of Vaison (1585).

== External links and additional sources ==
Catholic Church titles
Preceded by Cristóbal Berrocal	Bishop of Crotone; 1578–1581	Succeeded by Giuseppe Faraoni
Preceded by Scipione Salernitano	Bishop of Acerra; 1581–1586	Succeeded by Giovanni Battista del Tufo
