= Antonio Santucci (bishop) =

Italian Catholic bishop (1928–2018)

- Bishop of Trivento
- Church: Catholic Church
- Diocese: Diocese of Trivento
- In office: 8 May 1985 – 17 October 2005
- Predecessor: Antonio Valentini
- Successor: Domenico Angelo Scotti

Orders
- Ordination: 1 July 1951
- Consecration: 22 June 1985 by Bernardin Gantin

Personal details
- Born: 30 October 1928 Magliano de' Marsi, Province of L'Aquila, Kingdom of Italy
- Died: 26 September 2018 (aged 89) Magliano de' Marsi, Abruzzo, Italy

Antonio Santucci (30 October 1928 – 26 September 2018) was an Italian Catholic bishop.

Santucci was born in Italy and was ordained to the priesthood in 1951. He served as bishop of the Diocese of Trivento, Italy, from 1985 to 2005.
