= Carolus de Tilly =

Italian Roman Catholic prelate

Most Reverend Carolus de Tilly
- Bishop of Monopoli
- Church: Catholic Church
- Diocese: Diocese of Monopoli
- In office: 1697–1698
- Predecessor: Giuseppe Cavalieri
- Successor: Gaetano De Andrea
- Previous post: Bishop of Acerra (1692–1697)

Orders
- Ordination: 19 September 1665
- Consecration: 27 January 1692 by Marcantonio Barbarigo

Personal details
- Born: 1642 Villerupt
- Died: 1698 (age 56) Monopoli, Italy

Carolus de Tilly or Carlo de Tilly (1642–1698) was a Roman Catholic prelate who served as Bishop of Monopoli (1697–1698) and Bishop of Acerra (1692–1697).

== Biography ==
Carolus de Tilly was born in Villerupt in 1642 and ordained a priest on 19 September 1665. On 21 January 1692, he was appointed during the papacy of Pope Innocent XII as Bishop of Acerra. On 27 January 1692, he was consecrated bishop by Marcantonio Barbarigo, Bishop of Corneto e Montefiascone, with Giovan Donato Giannoni Alitto, Bishop of Ruvo, and Pietro Vecchia (bishop), Bishop of Molfetta, serving as co-consecrators. On 3 June 1697, he was appointed during the papacy of Pope Innocent XII as Bishop of Monopoli. He served as Bishop of Monopoli until his death in 1698.

== Episcopal succession ==
While bishop, he was the principal co-consecrator of:

- Giovanni Stefano Pastori, Bishop of Ventimiglia (1695);
- Vincenzo della Marra, Bishop of Alessano (1695); and
- Daniele Scoppa, Bishop of Nola (1695).

== External links and additional sources ==
- Cheney, David M. "Diocese of Monopoli". Catholic-Hierarchy.org. (for Chronology of Bishops) ^{[self-published]}
- Chow, Gabriel. "Diocese of Monopoli". GCatholic.org. (for Chronology of Bishops) ^{[self-published]}
- Cheney, David M. "Diocese of Acerra". Catholic-Hierarchy.org. (for Chronology of Bishops) ^{[self-published]}
- Chow, Gabriel. "Diocese of Acerra (Italy)". GCatholic.org. (for Chronology of Bishops) ^{[self-published]}

Catholic Church titles
Preceded by Carlo de Angelis	Bishop of Acerra; 1692–1697	Succeeded by Giuseppe Rodoero
Preceded by Giuseppe Cavalieri	Bishop of Monopoli; 1697–1698	Succeeded by Gaetano De Andrea
