= Giuseppe Rodoero =

17th-century Catholic bishop

Most Reverend Giuseppe Rodoero
- Bishop of Acerra
- Church: Catholic Church
- Diocese: Diocese of Acerra
- In office: 1697–1699
- Predecessor: Carolus de Tilly
- Successor: Benito Noriega

Orders
- Consecration: 7 July 1697 by Bandino Panciatici

Personal details
- Born: 18 October 1643 San Martin Montes Corbini, Italy
- Died: October 1699 (age 55) Acerra, Italy

Giuseppe Rodoero (1643–1699) was a Roman Catholic prelate who served as Bishop of Acerra (1697–1699).

== Biography ==
Giuseppe Rodoero was born in San Martin Montes Corbini, Italy on 18 October 1643. On 1 July 1697, he was appointed during the papacy of Pope Innocent XII as Bishop of Acerra. On 7 July 1697, he was consecrated bishop by Bandino Panciatici, Cardinal-Priest of San Pancrazio, with Prospero Bottini, Titular Archbishop of Myra, and Marcello d'Aste, Titular Archbishop of Athenae, serving as co-consecrators. He served as Bishop of Acerra until his death in October 1699.

== External links and additional sources ==
- Cheney, David M. "Diocese of Acerra". Catholic-Hierarchy.org. (for Chronology of Bishops) ^{[self-published]}
- Chow, Gabriel. "Diocese of Acerra (Italy)". GCatholic.org. (for Chronology of Bishops) ^{[self-published]}

Catholic Church titles
Preceded by Carolus de Tilly	Bishop of Acerra (1697–1699)	Succeeded by Benito Noriega
