= Raniero di Forcona =

Raniero (died 30 December 1077), was a bishop of the Catholic Church in Italy, venerated as a saint by the Catholic Church, after his name was included in the Roman Martyrology by Cesare Baronio.

== Hagiography ==
He was the Bishop of Forcona (the bishopric later moved to L'Aquila) in the on 6 May 1065 he participated in a synod held in Rome by Pope Alexander II; in a letter dated 18 January 1072, Alexander II congratulated him for the good administration of his Church, guaranteed his goods and rights.

He died on 30 December 1077.

== Veneration ==
Cesare Baronio, based on unknown "ancient monuments" from the diocese of L'Aquila, included his celebration on 30 December in the Roman Martyrology, but there is no other evidence of an ancient cult of his.

In the Roman Martyrology reformed according to the decrees of the Second Vatican Council and promulgated in 2001 by Pope John Paul II, his panegyric can be read on 30 December.

== Bibliography ==
- The Roman Martyrology. Reformed according to the decrees of the Second Vatican Ecumenical Council and promulgated by Pope John Paul II , LEV, Vatican City 2004.
- Filippo Caraffa and Giuseppe Morelli (eds.), Bibliotheca Sanctorum (BSS), 12 vols., Instituto Juan XXIII of the Pontifical Lateran University, Rome 1961–1969.

== See also ==
- Roman Catholic Archdiocese of L'Aquila
