= Vincenzo de Corbis =

Most Reverend Vincenzo de Corbis
- Bishop of Acerra
- Church: Catholic Church
- Diocese: Diocese of Acerra
- In office: 1511–1512
- Predecessor: Nicolás de Noya
- Successor: Juan de Vich

Personal details
- Died: 1512 Acerra, Italy

Vincenzo de Corbis (died) was a Roman Catholic prelate who served as Bishop of Acerra (1511–1512).

On 22 August 1511, Vincenzo de Corbis was appointed during the papacy of Pope Julius II as Bishop of Acerra. He served as Bishop of Acerra until his death in 1512.

== External links and additional sources ==
- Cheney, David M. "Diocese of Acerra". Catholic-Hierarchy.org. (for Chronology of Bishops) ^{[self-published]}
- Chow, Gabriel. "Diocese of Acerra (Italy)". GCatholic.org. (for Chronology of Bishops) ^{[self-published]}

Catholic Church titles
Preceded by Nicolás de Noya	Bishop of Acerra; 1511–1512	Succeeded by Juan de Vich
