= Gianfrancesco Sanseverino =

Italian Roman Catholic prelate

Most Reverend Gianfrancesco Sanseverino
- Bishop of Acerra
- Church: Catholic Church
- Diocese: Diocese of Acerra
- In office: 1556–1559
- Predecessor: Giampaolo da Pisa
- Successor: Giovanni Fabrizio Sanseverino

Gianfrancesco Sanseverino was a Roman Catholic prelate who served as Bishop of Acerra (1556–1559).

== Biography ==
On 6 July 1556, Gianfrancesco Sanseverino was appointed during the papacy of Pope Paul IV as Bishop of Acerra. He served as Bishop of Acerra until his resignation in 1559.

== External links and additional sources ==
- Cheney, David M. "Diocese of Acerra". Catholic-Hierarchy.org. (for Chronology of Bishops) ^{[self-published]}
- Chow, Gabriel. "Diocese of Acerra (Italy)". GCatholic.org. (for Chronology of Bishops) ^{[self-published]}

Catholic Church titles
Preceded by Giampaolo da Pisa	Bishop of Acerra; 1556–1559	Succeeded by Giovanni Fabrizio Sanseverino
