= Juan Vázquez Coronado de Sayás =

Italian Roman Catholic prelate

Most Reverend Juan Vázquez Coronado de Sayás
- Bishop of Acerra
- Church: Catholic Church
- Diocese: Diocese of Acerra
- In office: 1568–1571
- Predecessor: Giovanni Fabrizio Sanseverino
- Successor: Scipione Salernitano

Personal details
- Born: Spain
- Died: 1571 Acerra, Italy

Juan Vázquez Coronado de Sayás (died 1571) was a Roman Catholic prelate who served as Bishop of Acerra (1568–1571).

== Biography ==
Juan Vázquez Coronado de Sayás was born in Spain. On 23 July 1568, he was appointed during the papacy of Pope Pius V as Bishop of Acerra. He served as Bishop of Acerra until his death in 1571.

== External links and additional sources ==
- Cheney, David M. "Diocese of Acerra". Catholic-Hierarchy.org. (for Chronology of Bishops) ^{[self-published]}
- Chow, Gabriel. "Diocese of Acerra (Italy)". GCatholic.org. (for Chronology of Bishops) ^{[self-published]}

Catholic Church titles
Preceded by Giovanni Fabrizio Sanseverino	Bishop of Acerra; 1568–1571	Succeeded by Scipione Salernitano
