= Giovanni de Torrecilla y Cárdenas =

Catholic bishop (1623–1688)

Most Reverend Giovanni de Torrecilla y Cárdenas
- Archbishop of Brindisi
- Church: Catholic Church
- Archdiocese: Archdiocese of Brindisi
- In office: 1681–1688
- Predecessor: Manuel de la Torre (archbishop)
- Successor: Francesco Ramírez
- Previous post: Bishop of L'Aquila (1676–1681)

Orders
- Consecration: 28 October 1676 by Pietro Francesco Orsini de Gravina

Personal details
- Born: 2 April 1623 Almería, Spain
- Died: 24 June 1688 (age 65) Brindisi, Italy

Giovanni de Torrecilla y Cárdenas (2 April 1623 – 24 June 1688) was a Roman Catholic prelate who served as Archbishop of Brindisi (1681–1688) and Bishop of L'Aquila (1676–1681).

== Biography ==
Giovanni de Torrecilla y Cárdenas was born in Almería, Spain on 2 April 1623. On 10 November 1675, he was selected as Bishop of L'Aquila and confirmed by Pope Innocent XI on 19 October 1676. On 28 October 1676, he was consecrated bishop by Pietro Francesco Orsini de Gravina, Archbishop of Manfredonia, with Angelo della Noca, Archbishop Emeritus of Rossano, and Prospero Bottini, Titular Archbishop of Myra, serving as co-consecrators. On 17 March 1681, he was appointed during the papacy of Pope Innocent XI as Archbishop of Brindisi. He served as Archbishop of Brindisi until his death on 24 June 1688.

== External links and additional sources ==
- Cheney, David M. "Archdiocese of L'Aquila". Catholic-Hierarchy.org. (for Chronology of Bishops)
- Chow, Gabriel. "Metropolitan Archdiocese of L'Aquila". GCatholic.org. (for Chronology of Bishops)
- Cheney, David M. "Archdiocese of Brindisi-Ostuni". Catholic-Hierarchy.org. (for Chronology of Bishops)
- Chow, Gabriel. "Archdiocese of Brindisi-Ostuni". GCatholic.org. (for Chronology of Bishops)

Catholic Church titles
Preceded by Carlo de Angelis	Bishop of L'Aquila; 1676–1681	Succeeded by Arcangelo de Chilento
Preceded by Manuel de la Torre (archbishop)	Archbishop of Brindisi; 1681–1688	Succeeded by Francesco Ramírez
