= Juan Gurrea =

Spanish Roman Catholic prelate

Most Reverend Juan Gurrea
- Bishop of Acerra
- Church: Catholic Church
- Diocese: Diocese of Acerra
- In office: 1603–1606
- Predecessor: Giovanni Battista del Tufo
- Successor: Vincenzo Pagano

Personal details
- Born: 1540 Zaragoza, Spain
- Died: 1606 (age 66) Acerra, Italy

Juan Gurrea or Giovanni Gorrea (1540–1606) was a Roman Catholic prelate who served as Bishop of Acerra (1603–1606).

== Biography ==
Juan Gurrea was born in Zaragoza, Spain in 1540. On 23 June 1603, he was appointed during the papacy of Pope Clement VIII as Bishop of Acerra. He served as Bishop of Acerra until his death in 1606.

== External links and additional sources ==
- Cheney, David M. "Diocese of Acerra". Catholic-Hierarchy.org. (for Chronology of Bishops) ^{[self-published]}
- Chow, Gabriel. "Diocese of Acerra (Italy)". GCatholic.org. (for Chronology of Bishops) ^{[self-published]}

Catholic Church titles
Preceded by Giovanni Battista del Tufo	Bishop of Acerra; 1603–1606	Succeeded by Vincenzo Pagano
