= Francesco Ramírez =

Roman Catholic prelate (1648–1715)

Most Reverend Francesco Ramírez
- Archbishop (Personal Title) of Agrigento
- Church: Catholic Church
- Diocese: Diocese of Agrigento
- In office: 1697–1715
- Predecessor: Francesco Maria Rini
- Successor: Anselmo de la Peña

Orders
- Consecration: 6 March 1689 by Galeazzo Marescotti

Personal details
- Born: 14 February 1648 Estremera, Spain
- Died: 27 August 1715 (age 67) Agrigento, Italy

Francesco Ramírez, O.P. (14 February 1648 – 27 August 1715) was a Roman Catholic prelate who served as Archbishop (Personal Title) of Agrigento (1697–1715) and Archbishop of Brindisi (1689–1697).

== Biography ==
Francesco Ramírez was born in Estremera, Spain on 14 February 1648 and ordained a priest in the Order of Preachers. On 28 February 1689, he was appointed during the papacy of Pope Innocent XI as Archbishop of Brindisi. On 6 March 1689, he was consecrated bishop by Galeazzo Marescotti, Cardinal-Priest of Santi Quirico e Giulitta, with Alberto Mugiasca, Bishop of Alessandria della Paglia, and Alberto Sebastiano Botti, Bishop of Albenga, serving as co-consecrators. On 26 August 1697, he was appointed during the papacy of Pope Innocent XII as Archbishop (Personal Title) of Agrigento. He served as Bishop of Agrigento until his death on 27 August 1715.

== External links and additional sources ==
- Cheney, David M. "Archdiocese of Agrigento". Catholic-Hierarchy.org. (for Chronology of Bishops) ^{[self-published]}
- Chow, Gabriel. "Metropolitan Archdiocese of Agrigento". GCatholic.org. (for Chronology of Bishops) ^{[self-published]}
- Cheney, David M. "Archdiocese of Brindisi-Ostuni". Catholic-Hierarchy.org. (for Chronology of Bishops) ^{[self-published]}
- Chow, Gabriel. "Archdiocese of Brindisi-Ostuni". GCatholic.org. (for Chronology of Bishops) ^{[self-published]}

Catholic Church titles
Preceded by Giovanni de Torrecilla y Cárdenas	Archbishop of Brindisi; 1689–1697	Succeeded by Agustín Antonio de Arellano
Preceded by Francesco Maria Rini	Archbishop (Personal Title) of Agrigento; 1697–1715	Succeeded by Anselmo de la Peña
