= Placido Carafa =

Italian Roman Catholic prelate

Most Reverend Placido Carafa
- Bishop of Acerra
- Church: Catholic Church
- Diocese: Diocese of Acerra
- In office: 1662–1672
- Predecessor: Mansueto Merati
- Successor: Carlo de Angelis

Personal details
- Born: 1615 Naples, Italy
- Died: 31 December 1672 (age 57) Naples, Italy

Placido Carafa, C.R. (1615 – 31 December 1672) was a Roman Catholic prelate who served as Bishop of Acerra (1662–1672).

== Biography ==
Placido Carafa was born in Naples, Italy in 1615 and ordained a priest in the Congregation of Clerics Regular of the Divine Providence. On 26 March 1662, he was selected as Bishop of Acerra and confirmed by Pope Alexander VII on 9 April 1663. He served as Bishop of Acerra until his death on 31 December 1672 in Naples, Italy.

== External links and additional sources ==
- Cheney, David M. "Diocese of Acerra". Catholic-Hierarchy.org. (for Chronology of Bishops) ^{[self-published]}
- Chow, Gabriel. "Diocese of Acerra (Italy)". GCatholic.org. (for Chronology of Bishops) ^{[self-published]}

Catholic Church titles
Preceded by Mansueto Merati	Bishop of Acerra; 1662–1672	Succeeded by Carlo de Angelis
