= Diocese of Trivento =

Latin Catholic ecclesiastical territory in Italy

Coordinates: 41.7667°N 14.5500°E

Diocese of Trivento Dioecesis Triventinus

Catholic
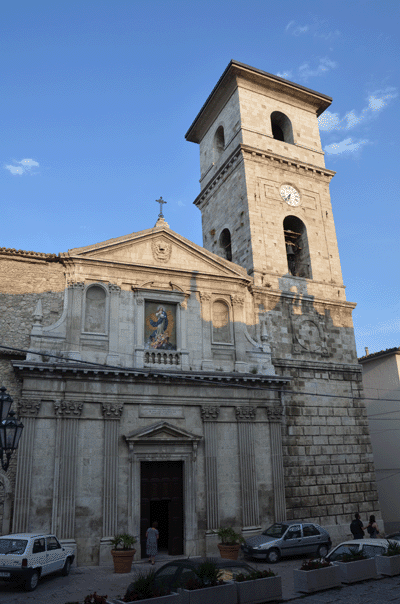
- Cattedrale dei Santi Nazario, Celso e Vittore

Location
- Country: Italy
- Ecclesiastical province: Campobasso-Boiano

Statistics
- Area: 1,234 km^{2} (476 sq mi)
- Population: Total; Catholics: (as of 2023); 47,800 (est.) ▼; 47,400 (est.) ▼
- Parishes: 58

Information
- Denomination: Catholic Church
- Sui iuris church: Latin Church
- Rite: Roman Rite
- Established: 10th Century
- Cathedral: Cattedrale di Ss. Nazaroi, Celso e Vittore
- Secular priests: 41 (diocesan) ▼13 (Religious Orders) ▲5 Permanent Deacons ▲

Current leadership
- Pope: Leo XIV
- Bishop: Camillo Cibotti
- Bishops emeritus: Domenico Angelo Scotti

Website
- www.diocesitrivento.it

The Diocese of Trivento (Latin: Dioecesis Triventinus) is a Latin Church ecclesiastical territory or diocese of the Catholic Church in Italy. The Diocese of Trivento is a suffragan diocese in the ecclesiastical province of the metropolitan Archdiocese of Campobasso-Boiano, in the ecclesiastical region of Abruzzo-Molise, southern Italy. Trivento is approximately 100-110 kilometers (roughly 62-68 miles) north-northwest of Benevento, in the civil Campobasso province, in the administrative region of Molise.

The cathedral of the diocese is the Cattedrale di Ss. Nazario, Celso e Vittore, Trivento. The other major sanctuary is at Canneto, in the commune Roccavivara, founded in the fourth century and until the tenth dependent on Montecassino.

== History ==
According to local legend the earliest bishop of Trivento was St. Castus, sent to Trivento by Pope Clement I at the end of the 1st century. Some seek to save the appearances by assigning him to the fourth century. The legend, which first appears in a document of the 14th century, has been disproved.

The Diocese of Trivento (the Latin adjective is: Triventinus) was established as a suffragan of the Archdiocese of Benevento.

In 946, Pope Agapetus II consecrated a Benedictine monk and priest named Leo as bishop of Trivento. He immediately received a protest from Archbishop Joannes of Benevento, who demonstrated with documents that he possessed the right to consecrate the bishops of Trivento. The pope admitted his mistake and gave way, deposed Leo from the diocesan seat, and advised the people of Trivento, under pain of excommunication, that they should not receive Leo or allow him to carry out episcopal functions. In passing, the archbishop notes that Trivento had been his and his predecessors' suffragan antiquitus.

In the Liber Censuum of 1192, the diocese of Trivento is listed as a suffragan of the archdiocese of Benevento. Bishop Giacomo (1290–1315), however, obtained from Pope Boniface VIII on 9 August 1296, the privilege of exemption from the jurisdiction of the archbishop of Benevento for himself for life.

In his war against Pope Gregory IX and then the College of Cardinals, the Emperor Frederick II passed through Trivento in 1241, and requisitioned all the gold, silver, jewels, and vestments belonging to the Church, which he sold and used to pay for his expedition.

On 30 June 1474, in the bull "Ad Apostolicae dignitatis," Pope Sixtus IV granted the bishops of Trivento exemption from the jurisdiction of the archbishops of Benevento, though still requiring them to attend the synods of the archbishop.

The diocese of Trivento, in 1532, had a population of 4,461 fuochi, or c. 20, 075 persons. When Bishop Carolus Scaglia (1631–1645) made his ad limina visit to Rome in 1643, he reported that the population was c. 35,000 persons, about 25,000 of whom were communicants.

Since the city of Trivento was near the northern border of the diocese, many bishops considered it more convenient to spend much of their time in Anglona, which was nearer the center of the diocese, and nearly twice the size of the episcopal city.

=== Changes of dynasties ===
In 1446, Pope Eugenius IV granted the Emperor Frederick III (Habsburg) the privilege of nominating a candidate to an episcopal vacancy in his lands. The privilege was renewed for successive emperors, until Sixtus IV made it permanent in 1480. In September 1523, the Emperor Charles V obtained the privilege for all the bishoprics in the Spanish church, and in 1529 it was extended to twenty-five of the 130 bishoprics in the Kingdom of Naples. Trivento was one of these.

By the Peace of Utrecht (1713), the kingdom of the Two Sicilies (including Naples) passed from the House of Bourbon to the House of Habsburg. By the Treaty of Vienna (1738), Naples passed under the control of King Charles III of Spain (Charles VII of Naples). Charles died on 6 October 1759, and was succeeded by Ferdinand IV of Naples. In 1818, in a new concordat with the kingdom of Naples, Pope Pius VII conceded to the kings the privilege of nominating candidates to all the dioceses in his kingdom.

In 1977 the diocese of Trivento gained territory from the Benedictine Territorial Abbacy of Montecassino, and lost territory to the Diocese of Sulmona.

=== Chapter and cathedral ===
The cathedral in Trivento is dedicated to Saints Nazarius, Celsus, and Victor. It was served by an ecclesiastical corporation called the Chapter, which was headed by five dignities, with six canons. The Chapter was presided over by the Archdeacon. In 1679, there were three dignities and eight canons. In 1756, there were five dignities and twelve canons.

=== Synods ===
Bishop Alfonso Mariconda, O.S.B. (1717–1730) held his first diocesan synod in Trivento in 1726, and his second from 31 May to 2 June 1727. The proceedings and relevant documents were published.

The diocesan priestly seminary was erected by Bishop Giulio Cesare Mariconda (Moriconi, Moriconda), O.F.M. (1582–1606).

== Extent of diocese ==
The diocese is currently divided for administrative purposes into four deaneries: Agnone, Carovilli, Frosolone and Trivento, which extend over 40 civil communes (municipalities) in three civil administrative provinces :

- in the civil Province of Campobasso: Trivento, Casalciprano, Castropignano, Duronia, Fossalto, Molise, Montefalcone nel Sannio, Pietracupa, Roccavivara, Salcito, San Biase e Torella del Sannio;
- in the civil Province of Isernia: Agnone, Bagnoli del Trigno, Belmonte del Sannio, Capracotta, Carovilli, Castel del Giudice, Castelverrino, Chiauci, Civitanova del Sannio, Frosolone, Montenero Val Cocchiara, Pescolanciano, Pescopennataro, Pietrabbondante, Poggio Sannita, Rionero Sannitico, San Pietro Avellana, Sant'Angelo del Pesco e Vastogirardi;
- in the civil Province of Chieti: Borrello, Castelguidone, Castiglione Messer Marino, Celenza sul Trigno, Roio del Sangro, Rosello, San Giovanni Lipioni, Schiavi di Abruzzo e Torrebruna.

== Bishops of Trivento ==
=== To 1379 ===
...

○ [ Leo, O.S.B.]

...

- Gaidulfus (1001–1015?)
- [Liutulphus 1015)]

...

- Maifredus (c. 1043)

...

- Alferius (1084)
- Giovanni (c. 1109–1115)

...

- Giovanni (1160–?)
- Raone (1175–?)
- Ignotus (1196 – ? )
- Tommaso (1226–1237)
- [Ignotus] (1237–1240)
- Riccardo (1240–?)
- Nicolaus (1256–?)
- Odorico (1258–?)
- Luca, O.F.M. (1258–1266)
- Pace (1266–?)
- Giacomo (1290–1315)
- Natimbene, O.E.S.A. (1334–1344)
- Giordano Curti (1344 – 1348.05.30), next Metropolitan Archbishop of Messina (Sicily, Italy) (1348.05.30 – 1348)
- Pietro dell'Aquila, O.F.M. (1348–1361)
- Guglielmo M. Farinerio, O.F.M. (1356–1368)
- Francesco De Ruberto (1370–1379)

=== From 1379 to 1684 ===
- Ruggiero De Carcasils (1379–1409), Roman Obedience
- Pietro Ferillo (1387–?), Avignon Obedience
- Giacomo of Gaeta (1409–c. 1421), Roman Obedience
- Giovanni Masi (1421–1451)
- Giacomo De Tertiis, O.S.B. (1452.09.27 – ?)
- Tommaso Carafa (1473.08.13 – ?), previously Bishop of Pozzuoli (Italy) (1470 – 1473.08.13)
- Bonifacio Troiano (1498–?)
- Leonardo Carmini (Leonardo Corbera) (21 Nov 1498 – 1502 Died)
- Tommaso Caracciolo (archbishop of Capua) (16 Mar 1502 – 1540 Resigned)
- Matteo Griffoni Pioppi, O.S.B. (15 Nov 1540 – 9 Apr 1567 Died)
- Giovanni Fabrizio Sanseverino (1568–1581)
- Giulio Cesare Mariconda, O.F.M. (1582–1606)
- Paolo del Lago, O.F.M. (1607–1621)
- Girolamo Costanzo (1623–1627)

Sede vacante (1627 – 1630)

- Martín de León Cárdenas, O.S.A. (1630–1631)
- Carolus Scaglia, Can. Reg. S.Geor (1631–1645)
- Giovanni Battista Capacci (16 Jul 1646 – 1652 Died)
- Giovanni de la Cruz, O.F.M. (20 Jan 1653 – 1654 Died)
- Giovanni Battista Ferruzzo, C.O. (14 Jan 1655 – Aug 1658 Died)
- Vincenzo Lanfranchi, C.R. (5 May 1660 – 7 Dec 1665)
- Ambrogio Maria Piccolomini, O.S.B. (1666–1675)

Sede vacante (1675 – 1679)

- Diego Ibáñez de la Madrid y Bustamente (1679–1684)

=== From 1684 to 1913 ===
- Antonio Tortorelli, O.F.M. (1684–1715)
- Alfonso Miraconda, O.S.B. (1717–1730)
- Fortunato Palumbo, O.S.B. (18 Dec 1730 – 19 Jul 1753 Died)
- Giuseppe Maria Carafa, C.R. (1754–1756)
- Giuseppe Pitocco (19 Jul 1756 – 30 May 1771)
- Gioacchino Paglione (23 Sep 1771 – Dec 1790)
- Luca Nicola de Luca (1792–1819)
- Bernardino D'Avolio, O.F.M. Cap. (21 Feb 1820 – 18 Jul 1821 Died)
- Giovanni De Simone, C.M. (19 Apr 1822 – 3 Jul 1826 Confirmed, Bishop of Conversano)
- Michele Arcangelo Del Forno (9 Apr 1827 – 18 Mar 1830 Resigned)
- Antonio Perchiacca (2 Jul 1832 – 26 Nov 1836 Died)
- Benedetto Terenzio (19 May 1837 – 27 Jan 1854 Died)
- Luigi Agazio, O.F.M. (23 Jun 1854 – 1 Feb 1887 Died)
- Domenico (Daniele) Tempesta, O.F.M. (14 Mar 1887 – 4 Jun 1891 Appointed, Bishop of Troia)
- Giulio Vaccaro (4 Jun 1891 – 30 Nov 1896 Appointed, Coadjutor Archbishop of Trani e Barletta (e Nazareth e Bisceglie))
- Carlo Pietropaoli (1897–1913)

=== Since 1913 ===
- Antonio Lega (25 May 1914 – 1921), appointed Coadjutor Archbishop of Ravenna
- Geremia Pascucci (1922–1926)
- Attilio Adinolfi (1928–1931), appointed Bishop of Anagni
- Giovanni Giorgis (1931–1937), appointed Bishop of Fiesole
- Epimenio Giannico (1937–1957)
- Pio Agostino Crivellari, O.F.M. (1958–1966)

Sede vacante (1966–1972)

- Achille Palmerini (1972–1975)
- Enzio d'Antonio (1975–1977), resigned
- Antonio Valentini (1977 – 1984), appointed Archbishop of Chieti
- Antonio Santucci (8 May 1985 – 17 Oct 2005), retired
- Domenico Angelo Scotti (17 Oct 2005 – 5 Jun 2017), retired
- Claudio Palumbo (2017–2024), appointed Bishop of Termoli-Larino
- Camillo Cibotti (2025–Present)

== See also ==
- List of Catholic dioceses in Italy

== Sources ==
=== Episcopal lists ===
- Eubel, Conradus, ed. (1913). Hierarchia catholica (in Latin). Vol. I (second ed.). Münster: Libreria Regensbergiana.
- Eubel, Conradus, ed. (1914). Hierarchia catholica (in Latin). Vol. II (second ed.). Münster: Libreria Regensbergiana.
- Eubel, Conradus; Gulik, Guilelmus (1923). Hierarchia catholica (in Latin). Vol. III (second ed.). Münster: Libreria Regensbergiana.
- Gams, Pius Bonifatius (1873). Series episcoporum Ecclesiae catholicae: quotquot innotuerunt a beato Petro apostolo (in Latin). Ratisbon: Typis et Sumptibus Georgii Josephi Manz. pp. 852–853.
- Gauchat, Patritius (Patrice) (1935). Hierarchia catholica (in Latin). Vol. IV (1592-1667). Münster: Libraria Regensbergiana.
- Ritzler, Remigius; Sefrin, Pirminus (1952). Hierarchia catholica medii et recentis aevi (in Latin). Vol. V (1667-1730). Patavii: Messagero di S. Antonio.
- Ritzler, Remigius; Sefrin, Pirminus (1958). Hierarchia catholica medii et recentis aevi (in Latin). Vol. VI (1730-1799). Patavii: Messagero di S. Antonio.

=== Studies ===
- Berardinelli, G.M. (2005). Cenni storici sulla chiesa vescovile di Trivento. (in Italian). Trivento: Tecnografica 2005.
- Cappelletti, Giuseppe (1870). Le chiese d'Italia: dalla loro origine sino ai nostri giorni (in Italian). Vol. vigesimo primo (21). Venezia: G. Antonelli. pp. 469–473.
- Cocozza, Valeria (2013). Chiesa e società a Trivento. Storia di una diocesi di regio patronato in età spagnola, Thesis laureate 2012-2013.
- Cocozza, Valeria (2017). Trivento e gli Austrias. Carriere episcopali, spazi sacri e territorio in una diocesi di regio patronato. (in Italian). Palermo: Quaderni - Mediterranea - ricerche storiche.
- D'Avino, Vincenzio (1848). Cenni storici sulle chiese arcivescovili, vescovili, e prelatizie (nullius) del regno delle due Sicilie. Napoli: Ranucci 1848. Pp. 692-702. [text by Canon Giuseppe Berardinelli]
- De Simone, E. (1993). I vescovi di Trivento. Da San Casto a S. Ecc. Pio Augusto Crivellari. (in Italian). Trivento: Tecnografica, 1993.
- Grimaldi, Ginesio (1743). Ragioni delle chiese, cappelle e luoghi pii ecclesiastic! della diocesi di Trivento. Napoli 1743.
- Iasiello, Italo M. (2007). Samnium: assetti e trasformazioni di una provincia dell'Italia tardoantica., Bari: Edipuglia 2007. pp. 139–140.
- Kamp, (Norbert (1973). Kirche und Monarchie im staufischen Königreich Sizilien. Prosopographische Grundlegung. Bistümer und Bischöfe des Königreichs 1194-1266. Vol 1: Abruzzen und Kampanien. (in German). München, 1973. Pp. 303-306.
- Kehr, Paulus Fridolin (1962). Italia pontificia. Regesta pontificum Romanorum. Vol. IX: Samnia – Apulia – Lucania. Berlin: Weidmann. (in Latin). pp. 193-197.
- Lanzoni, Francesco (1927). Le diocesi d'Italia dalle origini al principio del secolo VII (an. 604). (in Italian) vol. I, Faenza 1927, p. 379.
- Maselli, G. (1934). La Diocesi di Trivento. Agnone 1934.
- Ughelli, Ferdinando; Coleti, Nicolaus (1717). Italia sacra, sive de episcopis Italiae, et insularum adjacentium (in Latin). Vol. 1 T(omus primus). Venezia: Apud Sebastianum Coleti. pp. 1327–1333.

=== External links ===
- Chow, Gabriel, GCatholic.org, "Diocese of Trivento" [Google map - data for all sections]
