= Giampaolo da Pisa =

Italian Roman Catholic prelate

Most Reverend Giampaolo da Pisa
- Bishop of Acerra
- Church: Catholic Church
- Diocese: Diocese of Acerra
- In office: 1539–1554
- Predecessor: Gianvincenzo Carafa
- Successor: Gianfrancesco Sanseverino

Orders
- Consecration: 4 April 1540 by Alfonso Oliva

Personal details
- Died: 1554 Acerra, Italy

Giampaolo da Pisa or Pietro Paolo de Thisis (died 1554) was a Roman Catholic prelate who served as Bishop of Acerra (1539–1554).

== Biography ==
On 21 April 1539, Giampaolo da Pisa was appointed during the papacy of Pope Paul III as Bishop of Acerra. On 4 April 1540, he was consecrated bishop by Alfonso Oliva, Bishop of Bovino. He served as Bishop of Acerra until his death in 1554.

== External links and additional sources ==
- Cheney, David M. "Diocese of Acerra". Catholic-Hierarchy.org. (for Chronology of Bishops) ^{[self-published]}
- Chow, Gabriel. "Diocese of Acerra (Italy)". GCatholic.org. (for Chronology of Bishops) ^{[self-published]}

Catholic Church titles
Preceded by Gianvincenzo Carafa	Bishop of Acerra; 1539–1554	Succeeded by Gianfrancesco Sanseverino
