= Francesco Carafa =

16th-century Italian bishop

Most Reverend Francesco Carafa
- Archbishop of Naples
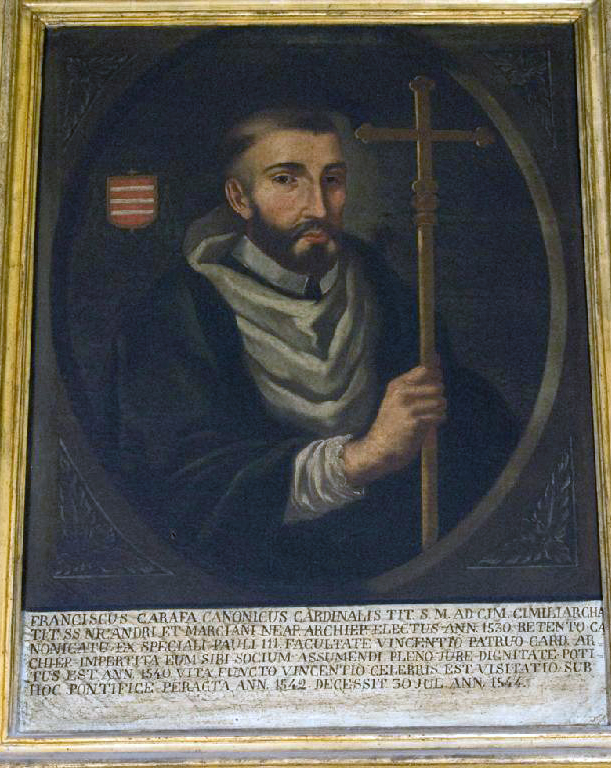
- Church: Catholic Church
- Archdiocese: Archdiocese of Naples
- In office: 1530–1544
- Predecessor: Gianvincenzo Carafa
- Successor: Ranuccio Farnese (cardinal)

Personal details
- Died: 30 July 1544 Naples, Kingdom of Naples

Francesco Carafa (died 30 July 1544) was a Roman Catholic prelate who served as Archbishop of Naples from his appointment by Pope Clement VII on 24 January 1530 until his death.

Catholic Church titles
Preceded by Gianvincenzo Carafa	Archbishop of Naples; 1530–1544	Succeeded by Ranuccio Farnese
