= Carlo Martini (nuncio) =

Italian priest and theologian

- Archbishop of L'Aquila
- Church: Catholic Church
- Archdiocese: Archdiocese of L'Aquila
- In office: 2 June 1973 – 31 December 1983
- Predecessor: Costantino Stella
- Successor: Mario Peressin
- Previous posts: Apostolic Delegate to Mexico (1970-1973); Apostolic Nuncio to Chile (1967-1970); Apostolic Nuncio to the Philippines (1963-1967); Titular Archbishop of Abari (1961-1973); Apostolic Nuncio to Paraguay (1958-1963)

Orders
- Ordination: 4 October 1936 by Ersilio Menzani
- Consecration: 29 October 1961 by Antonio Samorè

Personal details
- Born: 1 October 1913 Fontana Fredda (southeast of Cadeo), Province of Piacenza, Kingdom of Italy
- Died: 16 July 1986 (aged 72) Piacenza, Emilia-Romagna, Italy
- Coat of arms

Carlo Martini (1 October 1913 – 16 July 1986) was an Italian prelate of the Catholic Church who worked in the diplomatic service of the Holy See from 1937 to 1973 and then served for ten years as Archbishop of L'Aquila.

== Biography ==
He was born in Fontana Fredda, part of Cadeo, in the Province of Piacenza on 1 October 1913.

Before deciding to become a priest, he studied at the lower technical institute of Fiorenzuola d'Arda. He then entered the seminary of Piacenza. In 1929 he began studying philosophy and theology at Collegio Alberoni.

On 4 October 1936 he was ordained a priest.

The same year he became a student at the Pontifical Lateran University, where he obtained a doctorate in canon law in 1939.

He completed the course of study at the Pontifical Ecclesiastical Academy in 1937. He entered the diplomatic service of the Holy See and served in several nunciatures, as secretary in Spain from 1940 to 1942 and in Cuba from 1942 to 1948; then in Rome at the Secretariat of State until 1951; then as auditor in Colombia from 1951 to 1954 and as councilor in Spain.

On 25 March 1958, Pope Pius XII named him apostolic nuncio to Paraguay. He was the youngest nuncio at the time.

On 5 October 1961, Pope John XXIII appointed him titular archbishop of Abari, and on 29 October he received his episcopal consecration in the Piacenza Cathedral from Archbishop Antonio Samorè. Pope Paul VI named him apostolic nuncio to the Philippines on 29 November 1963, apostolic nuncio to Chile on 5 August 1967, and apostolic delegate to Mexico on 6 July 1970.

On 2 June 1973, Pope Paul appointed him Archbishop of L'Aquila. On 31 December 1983, Pope John Paul accepted his resignation presented for health reasons. He retired to the "Cerati" Residence for Clergy in Piacenza, where he continued to perform confirmations and perform the functions of a bishop as needed.

He died in Piacenza on 16 July 1986 at the age of 72. On 19 July his funeral was celebrated by Cardinal Agostino Casaroli, his classmate at the Pontifical Ecclesiastical Academy, in Piacenza cathedral.

Catholic Church titles
Preceded by Salvatore Siino	Apostolic Nuncio to the Philippines; 1963-1967	Succeeded by Carmine Rocco
