= Nicolás de Noya =

Italian prelate

Most Reverend Nicolás de Noya
- Bishop of Acerra
- Church: Catholic Church
- Diocese: Diocese of Acerra
- In office: 1504–1511
- Predecessor: Roberto de Noya
- Successor: Vincenzo de Corbis

Personal details
- Died: 1511 Acerra, Italy

Nicolás de Noya, O.P. or Pedro de Noya (died 1511) was an Italian Roman Catholic prelate who served as Bishop of Acerra (1504–1511).

== Biography ==
Nicolás de Noya was ordained a priest in the Order of Preachers. On 15 April 1504, he was appointed during the papacy of Pope Julius II as Bishop of Acerra. He served as Bishop of Acerra until his death in 1511.

== External links and additional sources ==
- Cheney, David M. "Diocese of Acerra". Catholic-Hierarchy.org. (for Chronology of Bishops) ^{[self-published]}
- Chow, Gabriel. "Diocese of Acerra (Italy)". GCatholic.org. (for Chronology of Bishops) ^{[self-published]}

Catholic Church titles
Preceded by Roberto de Noya	Bishop of Acerra; 1504–1511	Succeeded by Vincenzo de Corbis
