= Palazzo Arcivescovile (L'Aquila) =

- Interactive map of the Palazzo Arcivescovile (L'Aquila) area
- Alternative names: Palazzo dell'Arcivescovado

General information
- Status: under restoration
- Type: Palace
- Architectural style: Neo-Renaissance
- Location: Abruzzo, L'Aquila, Italy, Dome Square
- Coordinates: 42.348913°N 13.397126°E
- Current tenants: Seat of the Archdiocese of L'Aquila Diocesan Museum.
- Construction started: 1683
- Renovated: 1859

Design and construction
- Architect: Costantino Costantini

The Palazzo Arcivescovile, also palazzo dell’Arcivescovado, is a historic palace in Aquila, seat of the Archdiocese of L'Aquila.

== History ==
The Archdiocese of L'Aquila was established in 1256 with the papal bull of Pope Alexander IV, thanks to the transfer of the diocese of Forcona to the new city and its elevation to archdiocese. Starting from the 13th century and for the first centuries of its existence, the episcopate found its seat in the buildings adjacent to the southern front of the cathedral, where a valuable mixed civic and religious block was consolidated, especially in the Fourteenth century.

In 1683, the bishop Ignacio de la Cerda decided to build a large new palace overlooking the Piazza del Duomo that closed the space between the cathedral and the palazzo de' Nardis, so that the entire urban core of the episcope — including the oratory of Santa Maria della Pietà of the confraternity of the same name — found itself obscured from public view. The building was later renovated in the 18th century following the 1703 L'Aquila earthquake.

The current forms of the Archbishop's Palace are to be referred to the reconstruction carried out from 1859 by the bishop, and architect, Luigi Filippi, who revolutionised the entire complex; during this phase, to replace the previous chapel, the oratory of San Luigi Gonzaga (L'Aquila)] was also built, located in the courtyard of the episcope and from that moment on dedicated exclusively to seminarians.

The 2009 L'Aquila earthquake caused major collapses in the complex, which is now undergoing consolidation and restoration.

== Description ==
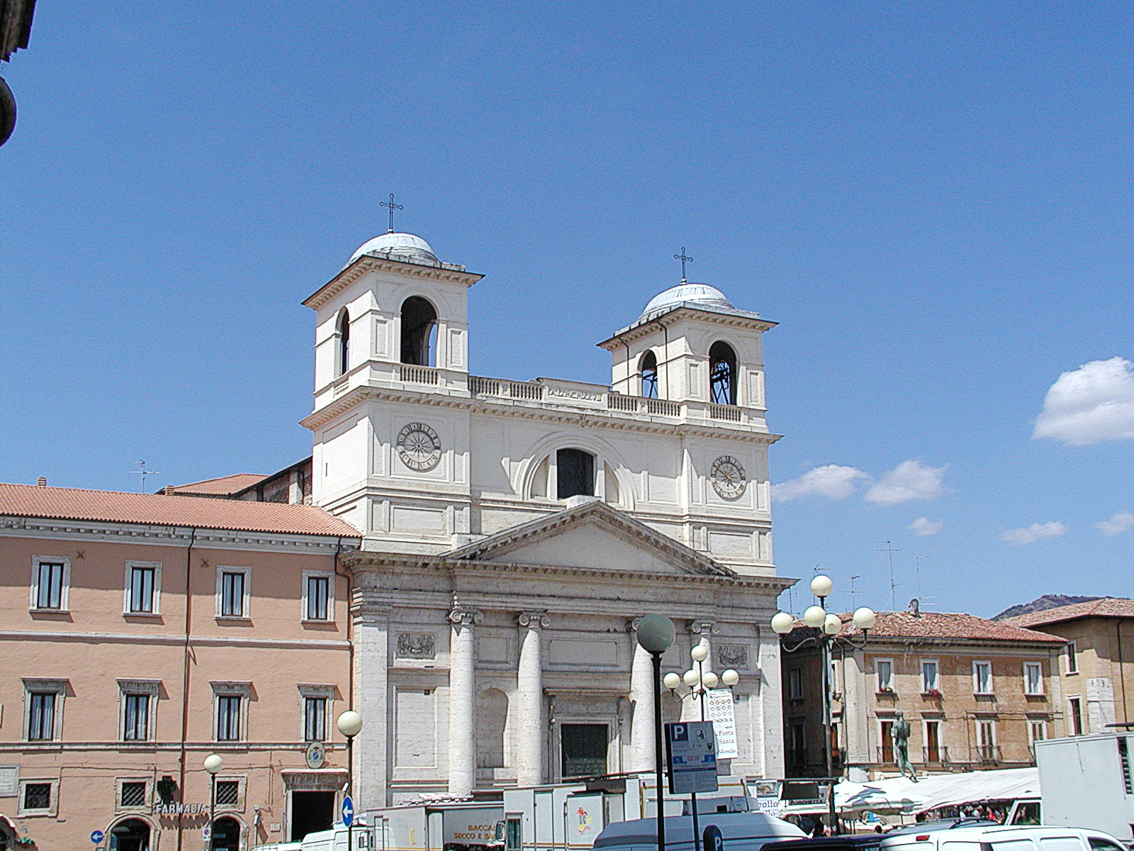
The L'Aquila Cathedral with the Archbishop's Palace to its left

The palace is located in Cathedral Square, adjacent to the Cathedral of L'Aquila, and is included in the quarter of San Giovanni. It forms a vast complex, in turn included in a single aggregate with the adjacent Palazzo Arduini and Palazzo de' Nardis, being circumscribed by the streets of the Archbishopric, San Marciano and the Seminary.

The main façade, in the style of Neo-Renaissance architecture, faces directly onto the square, squeezed between that of Palazzo de' Nardis, on the left, and the cathedral, on the right. It presents a classical scheme with three orders: the basement is characterised by five portals and a representative entrance, while the two orders above are characterised by eight holes of different shapes between one level and another.

The portal, quadrangular in shape, is not centred on the façade but located adjacent to the cathedral, in correspondence with the street inside the Archbishopric and closed in the 17th century with the building of the palace.

Inside there is the entrance to the palace and, at the front, the oratory of San Luigi Gonzaga with paintings by Giulio Cesare Bedeschini, Pompeo Cesura and Bernardino Monaldi.

== Bibliography ==
=== Italian sources ===
- AA.VV., L'Aquila. Una città d'arte da salvare – Saving an Art City, Pescara, Carsa, 2009.
- Alessandro Clementi e Elio Piroddi, L'Aquila, Bari, Laterza, 1986.
- Orlando Antonini, Architettura religiosa aquilana, II, Todi, Tau Editrice, 2010.
- Raffaele Colapietra, L'Aquila: i palazzi, L'Aquila, Ediarte, 1997.
- Touring Club Italiano, L'Italia – Abruzzo e Molise, Milano, Touring Editore, 2005.
