= Mansueto Merati =

Roman Catholic priest and bishop

Most Reverend Mansueto Merati
- Bishop of Acerra
- Church: Catholic Church
- Diocese: Diocese of Acerra
- In office: 1644–1662
- Predecessor: Vincenzo Pagano
- Successor: Placido Carafa

Personal details
- Born: 1590 Milan, Italy
- Died: 1662 (age 72) Acerra, Italy

Mansueto Merati, B. (1590–1662) was a Roman Catholic prelate who served as Bishop of Acerra (1644–1662).

== Biography ==
Mansueto Merati was born in Milan, Italy in 1590 and ordained a priest in the Clerics Regular of St. Paul. On 13 July 1644, he was appointed during the papacy of Pope Urban VIII as Bishop of Acerra. He served as Bishop of Acerra until his death in 1662.

== External links and additional sources ==
- Cheney, David M. "Diocese of Acerra". Catholic-Hierarchy.org. (for Chronology of Bishops) ^{[self-published]}
- Chow, Gabriel. "Diocese of Acerra (Italy)". GCatholic.org. (for Chronology of Bishops) ^{[self-published]}

Catholic Church titles
Preceded by Vincenzo Pagano	Bishop of Acerra; 1644–1662	Succeeded by Placido Carafa
