= Antonio Riboldi =

Antonio Riboldi, I.C.
- Bishop of the Diocese of Acerra (emeritus)
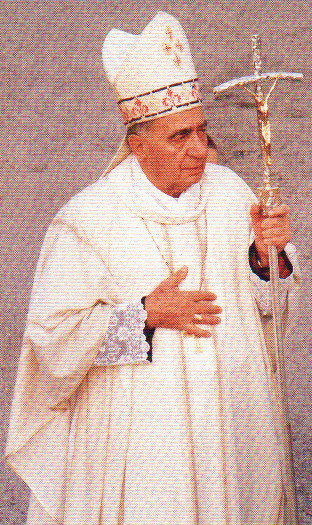
- Church: Roman Catholic Church
- See: Roman Catholic Diocese of Acerra
- In office: 1978–1999
- Predecessor: Nicola Capasso
- Successor: Salvatore Giovanni Rinaldi
- Previous post: Prelate

Orders
- Ordination: 29 June 1951

Personal details
- Born: 16 January 1923 Triuggio, Italy
- Died: 10 December 2017 (aged 94) Stresa, Italy

Antonio Riboldi, I.C. (16 January 1923 – 10 December 2017) was an Italian Prelate of the Catholic Church. Riboldi was born in Triuggio, Italy and ordained a priest on 29 June 1951 in the religious order of the Institute of Charity. Riboldi was appointed bishop of the Diocese of Acerra on 25 January 1978 and ordained on 11 March 1978. Riboldi retired from the Diocese of Acerra on 7 December 1999.
