= Giuseppe Molinari =

Catholic archbishop

- Archbishop Emeritus of L'Aquila
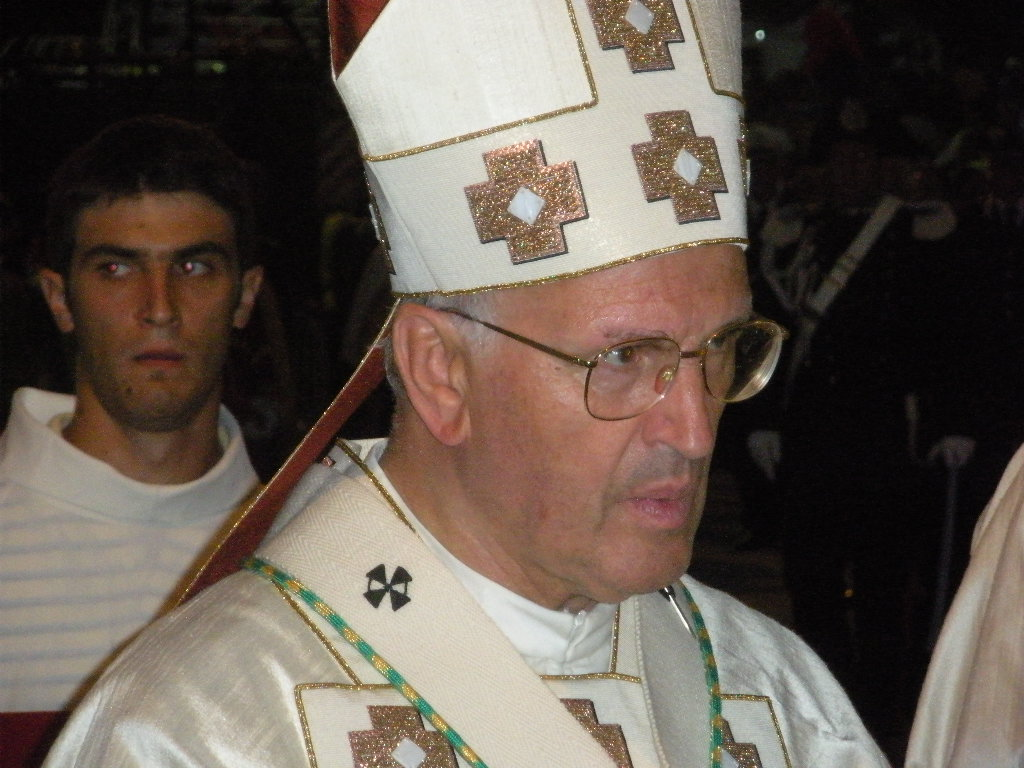
- Archbishop Molinari during a liturgical celebration, 29 August 2009
- Church: Catholic Church
- Archdiocese: Archdiocese of L'Aquila
- In office: 6 June 1998 – 8 June 2013
- Predecessor: Mario Peressin
- Successor: Giuseppe Petrocchi
- Previous posts: Coadjutor Archbishop of L'Aquila (1996-1998); Bishop of Rieti (1989-1996)

Orders
- Ordination: 29 June 1962 by Costantino Stella
- Consecration: 8 December 1989 by Mario Peressin

Personal details
- Born: 11 January 1938 (age 88) Scoppito, Province of L'Aquila, Kingdom of Italy

Styles of Giuseppe Molinari
- Reference style: The Most Reverend
- Spoken style: Your Excellency
- Religious style: Monsignor

Giuseppe Molinari (born 11 January 1938) is an Italian Catholic bishop, who served as Archbishop of L'Aquila.

Born in Scoppito, he was ordained to the priesthood on 29 June 1962.

On 30 September 1989, he was appointed Bishop of Rieti by Pope John Paul II. He received his episcopal consecration on the following December 8 from Archbishop Mario Peressin, assisted by Bishop Francesco Amadio and Archbishop Cleto Bellucci as co-consecrators.

Molinari was named Coadjutor Archbishop of L'Aquila on 16 March 1996. He succeeded Archbishop Peressin as Archbishop of L'Aquila upon the latter's resignation on 6 June 1998.

Molinari took an active role in dealing with the aftermath of the 2009 L'Aquila earthquake disaster and has also been involved in the reconstruction process.

On 8 June 2013, he retired as archbishop. Archbishop Giuseppe Petrocchi was appointed his successor.

== External links and additional sources ==
- Cheney, David M. "Archdiocese of L'Aquila". Catholic-Hierarchy.org. (for Chronology of Bishops)^{self-published}
- Chow, Gabriel. "Metropolitan Archdiocese of L'Aquila". GCatholic.org. (for Chronology of Bishops)^{self-published}
- Archdiocese of L'Aquila official profile

Catholic Church titles
Preceded by Francesco Amadio	Bishop of Rieti; 1989 – 1996	Succeeded by Delio Lucarelli
Preceded by Mario Peressin	Archbishop of L'Aquila; 1998 – 2013	Succeeded by Giuseppe Petrocchi
