= Scipione Salernitano =

Italian Roman Catholic prelate

Most Reverend Scipione Salernitano
- Bishop of Acerra
- Church: Catholic Church
- Diocese: Diocese of Acerra
- In office: 1571–1581
- Predecessor: Juan Vázquez Coronado de Sayás
- Successor: Marcello Maiorana

Personal details
- Died: 1581 Acerra, Italy

Scipione Salernitano (died 1581) was a Roman Catholic prelate who served as Bishop of Acerra (1571–1581).

On 16 July 1571, Scipione Salernitano was appointed during the papacy of Pope Pius V as Bishop of Acerra. He served as Bishop of Acerra until his death in 1581.

== External links and additional sources ==
- Cheney, David M. "Diocese of Acerra". Catholic-Hierarchy.org. (for Chronology of Bishops) ^{[self-published]}
- Chow, Gabriel. "Diocese of Acerra (Italy)". GCatholic.org. (for Chronology of Bishops) ^{[self-published]}

Catholic Church titles
Preceded by Juan Vázquez Coronado de Sayás	Bishop of Acerra; 1571–1581	Succeeded by Marcello Maiorana
