= Gaetano De Andrea =

Italian Roman Catholic prelate

Most Reverend Gaetano De Andrea
- Church: Catholic Church
- Diocese: Diocese of Monopoli
- In office: 1698–1702
- Predecessor: Carolus de Tilly
- Successor: Alfonso Francesco Dominquez

Orders
- Consecration: 21 September 1698 by Pier Matteo Petrucci

Personal details
- Born: 14 September 1630 Ravello, Italy
- Died: 1702 (aged 71–72)

Gaetano De Andrea, C.R. (1630–1702) was a Roman Catholic prelate who served as Bishop of Monopoli (1698–1702).

== Biography ==
Gaetano De Andrea was born on 14 September 1630 in Ravello, Italy and ordained a priest in the Congregation of Clerics Regular of the Divine Providence. On 15 September 1698, he was appointed during the papacy of Pope Innocent XII as Bishop of Monopoli. On 21 September 1698, he was consecrated bishop by Pier Matteo Petrucci, Cardinal-Priest of San Marcello al Corso, with Francesco Pannocchieschi d'Elci, Archbishop of Pisa, and Domenico Belisario de Bellis, Bishop of Molfetta, serving as co-consecrators. He served as Bishop of Monopoli until his death in January 1702.

== External links and additional sources ==
- Cheney, David M. "Diocese of Monopoli". Catholic-Hierarchy.org. (for Chronology of Bishops) ^{[self-published]}
- Chow, Gabriel. "Diocese of Monopoli". GCatholic.org. (for Chronology of Bishops) ^{[self-published]}

Catholic Church titles
Preceded by Carolus de Tilly	Bishop of Monopoli; 1698–1702	Succeeded by Alfonso Francesco Dominquez
