= Mario Peressin =

- Archbishop of L'Aquila
- Church: Catholic Church
- Archdiocese: Archdiocese of L'Aquila
- In office: 31 December 1983 – 6 June 1998
- Predecessor: Carlo Martini
- Successor: Giuseppe Molinari
- Previous post: Coadjutor Archbishop of L'Aquila (1983)

Orders
- Ordination: 30 June 1946 by Vittorio D'Alessi
- Consecration: 29 June 1983 by Sebastiano Baggio

Personal details
- Born: 17 May 1923 Azzano Decimo, Province of Udine, Kingdom of Italy
- Died: 11 October 1999 (aged 76) Coppito (west of L'Aquila), Abruzzo, Italy

Mario Peressin (17 May 1923 – 11 October 1999, Azzano Decimo) was the Archbishop of L'Aquila from 1983 to 1998.

== External links and additional sources ==
- Cheney, David M. "Archdiocese of L'Aquila". Catholic-Hierarchy.org. (for Chronology of Bishops)^{self-published}
- Chow, Gabriel. "Metropolitan Archdiocese of L'Aquila". GCatholic.org. (for Chronology of Bishops)^{self-published}
