= Giovanni Fabrizio Sanseverino =

Italian Roman Catholic prelate

Most Reverend Giovanni Fabrizio Sanseverino
- Bishop of Acerra
- Church: Catholic Church
- Diocese: Diocese of Trivento
- In office: 1568–?
- Predecessor: Matteo Griffoni Pioppi
- Successor: Giulio Cesare Mariconda

Giovanni Fabrizio Sanseverino was a Roman Catholic prelate who served as Bishop of Trivento (1568 – ?) and Bishop of Acerra (1560 – 1568).

== Biography ==
On 13 March 1560, Giovanni Fabrizio Sanseverino was appointed during the papacy of Pope Pius IV as Bishop of Acerra. In 1568, Giovanni Fabrizio Sanseverino was appointed during the papacy of Pope Pius V as Bishop of Trivento. It is uncertain how long he served as Bishop of Trivento; the next bishop of record was Giulio Cesare Mariconda appointed in 1582.

== External links and additional sources ==
- Cheney, David M. "Diocese of Acerra". Catholic-Hierarchy.org. (for Chronology of Bishops) ^{[self-published]}
- Chow, Gabriel. "Diocese of Acerra (Italy)". GCatholic.org. (for Chronology of Bishops) ^{[self-published]}
- Cheney, David M. "Diocese of Trivento". Catholic-Hierarchy.org. (for Chronology of Bishops) ^{[self-published]}
- Chow, Gabriel. "Diocese of Trivento (Italy)". GCatholic.org. (for Chronology of Bishops) ^{[self-published]}

Catholic Church titles
Preceded by Gianfrancesco Sanseverino	Bishop of Acerra; 1560–1568	Succeeded by Juan Vázquez Coronado de Sayás
Preceded by Matteo Griffoni Pioppi	Bishop of Trivento; 1568–?	Succeeded by Giulio Cesare Mariconda
