= Juan de Vich =

Roman Catholic prelate

Most Reverend Juan de Vich
- Bishop of Acerra
- Church: Catholic Church
- Diocese: Diocese of Acerra
- In office: 1512–1526
- Predecessor: Vincenzo de Corbis
- Successor: Carlo degli Ariosti

Personal details
- Died: 1526 Acerra, Italy

Juan de Vich OP (died 1526) was a Roman Catholic prelate who served as Bishop of Acerra (1512–1526).

== Biography ==
Juan de Vich was born in Spain and ordained a priest in the Order of Preachers. On 23 July 1512, he was appointed during the papacy of Pope Julius II as Bishop of Acerra. He served as Bishop of Acerra until his death in 1526.

== External links and additional sources ==
- Cheney, David M. "Diocese of Acerra". Catholic-Hierarchy.org. (for Chronology of Bishops) ^{[self-published]}
- Chow, Gabriel. "Diocese of Acerra (Italy)". GCatholic.org. (for Chronology of Bishops) ^{[self-published]}

Catholic Church titles
Preceded by Vincenzo de Corbis	Bishop of Acerra; 1512–1526	Succeeded by Carlo degli Ariosti
