= Leone Cortese =

Most Reverend Leone Cortese
- Bishop of Acerra
- Church: Catholic Church
- Diocese: Diocese of Acerra
- In office: 1452–1496
- Successor: Roberto de Noya

Personal details
- Died: 1496 Acerra, Italy

Leone Cortese (died 1496) was a Roman Catholic prelate who served as Bishop of Acerra (1452–1496).

== Biography ==
On 2 October 1452, Leone Cortese was appointed by Pope Nicholas V as Bishop of Acerra. He served as Bishop of Acerra until his death in 1496.

== Episcopal succession ==
While bishop, he was the principal co-consecrator of:

- Oliviero Carafa, Archbishop of Naples (1458); and
- Scipione Cicinelli, Archbishop of Sorrento (1470).

== External links and additional sources ==
- Cheney, David M. "Diocese of Acerra". Catholic-Hierarchy.org. (for Chronology of Bishops) ^{[self-published]}
- Chow, Gabriel. "Diocese of Acerra (Italy)". GCatholic.org. (for Chronology of Bishops) ^{[self-published]}

Catholic Church titles
Preceded by	Bishop of Acerra; 1452–1496	Succeeded by Roberto de Noya
