= Domenico Pecile =

- Bishop of the Diocese of Latina-Terracina-Sezze-Priverno (Emeritus)
- Church: Roman Catholic Church
- See: Diocese of Latina-Terracina-Sezze-Priverno
- In office: 1983–1998
- Predecessor: Enrico Romolo Compagnone
- Successor: Giuseppe Petrocchi
- Previous post(s): Prelate

Orders
- Ordination: 11 July 1948

Personal details
- Born: 9 October 1922; San Vito di Fagagna, Italy
- Died: 29 June 2011 (aged 88)

Domenico Pecile (9 October 1922 – 29 June 2011) was an Italian Prelate of Roman Catholic Church.

Domenico Pecile was born in San Vito di Fagagna, Italy, ordained a priest on 11 July 1948. Juric was appointed bishop to the Diocese of Latina-Terracina-Sezze-Priverno on 22 December 1983 and ordained bishop on 6 January 1984. Pecile retired on 27 June 1998.

== See also ==
- Diocese of Latina-Terracina-Sezze-Priverno
