= Silvano Montevecchi =

Italian Roman Catholic bishop

- Bishop of Ascoli Piceno
- Church: Catholic Church
- Diocese: Diocese of Ascoli Piceno
- In office: 30 August 1997 – 20 September 2013
- Predecessor: Pier Luigi Mazzoni
- Successor: Giovanni D'Ercole

Orders
- Ordination: 16 June 1962 by Giuseppe Battaglia
- Consecration: 4 October 1997 by Achille Silvestrini

Personal details
- Born: 31 March 1938 Villa San Giorgio in Vezzano, Brisighella, Province of Ravenna, Kingdom of Italy
- Died: 27 September 2013 (aged 75) Montecatone, Imola, Province of Bologna, Italy

Silvano Montevecchi (31 March 1938 – 27 September 2013) was a Roman Catholic bishop.

Ordained to the priesthood in 1962, Montevecchi was named bishop of the Diocese of Ascoli Piceno, Italy, in 1997 where he died in office in 2013.
