= Roberto de Noya =

Italian Roman Catholic prelate (died 1515)

Most Reverend Roberto de Noya
- Archbishop of Naxos
- Church: Catholic Church
- Archdiocese: Archdiocese of Naxos
- In office: 1504–1515
- Successor: Paolo Zabarella

Personal details
- Born: Apulia, Italy
- Died: 1515 Naxos, Greece

Roberto de Noya, O.P. or Roberto de Noja (died 1515) was an Italian Roman Catholic prelate who served as Archbishop of Naxos (1504–1515), Bishop of Acerra (1497–1504), and Bishop of Minervino Murge (1492–1497).

== Biography ==
Roberto de Noya was born in the region of Apulia, Italy and ordained a priest in the Order of Preachers. On 23 January 1492, he was appointed Bishop of Minervino Murge by Pope Innocent VIII. On 15 March 1497, he was transferred to the diocese of Acerra by Pope Alexander VI. On 15 April 1504, he was appointed by Pope Julius II as titular Archbishop of Naxos. He held the title of Archbishop of Naxos until his death on 22 April 1515.

== External links and additional sources ==
- Cheney, David M. "Archdiocese of Naxos, Andros, Tinos e Mykonos". Catholic-Hierarchy.org. (for Chronology of Bishops) ^{[self-published]}
- Chow, Gabriel. "Metropolitan Archdiocese of Naxos–Andros–Tinos–Mykonos (Greece)". GCatholic.org. (for Chronology of Bishops) ^{[self-published]}
- Cheney, David M. "Diocese of Acerra". Catholic-Hierarchy.org. (for Chronology of Bishops) ^{[self-published]}
- Chow, Gabriel. "Diocese of Acerra (Italy)". GCatholic.org. (for Chronology of Bishops) ^{[self-published]}
- Cheney, David M. "Diocese of Minervino Murge". Catholic-Hierarchy.org. (for Chronology of Bishops) ^{[self-published]}
- Chow, Gabriel. "Titular Episcopal See of Minervino Murge (Italy)". GCatholic.org. (for Chronology of Bishops) ^{[self-published]}

Catholic Church titles
Preceded by	Bishop of Minervino Murge; 1492–1497	Succeeded by Marino Falconi
Preceded by Leone Cortese	Bishop of Acerra; 1497–1504	Succeeded by Nicolás de Noya
Preceded by Nicola di Gaeta	Archbishop of Naxos; 1504–1515	Succeeded by Paolo Zabarella
