= Diocese of Acerra =

Roman Catholic diocese in Italy

Coordinates: 40.9500°N 14.3667°E

Archdiocese of Acerra Dioecesis Acerrarum

Catholic
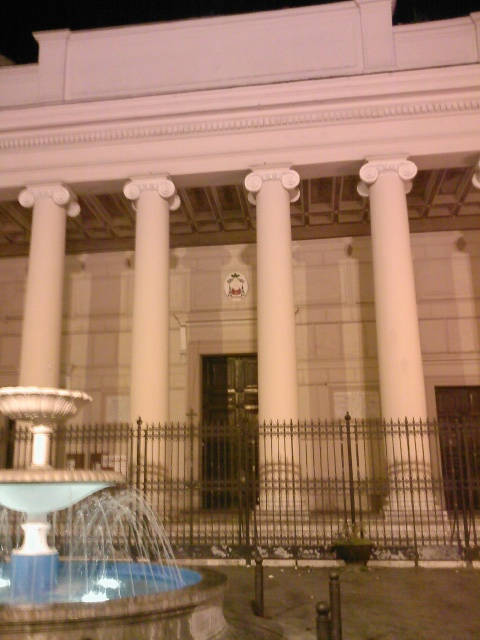
- Acerra Cathedral

Location
- Country: Italy
- Ecclesiastical province: Naples

Statistics
- Area: 157 km^{2} (61 sq mi)
- Population: Total; Catholics: (as of 2015); 125,657; 121,810 (96.9%)
- Parishes: 28

Information
- Denomination: Catholic Church
- Rite: Roman Rite
- Established: 11th Century
- Cathedral: Cattedrale di S. Maria Assunta
- Patron saint: Alphonsus Liguori; Conon
- Secular priests: 36 (diocesan); 14 (Religious Orders)

Current leadership
- Pope: Leo XIV
- Bishop: Antonio Di Donna

Website
- www.diocesiacerra.it

The Diocese of Acerra (Latin: Dioecesis Acerrarum) is a Latin diocese of the Catholic Church in Campania, southern Italy, eight miles east of Naples, in the area once called Terra Laboris (Liburia). It has existed since the 11th century. It is a suffragan of the Archdiocese of Naples.

The diocese has one priest for every 2,436 Catholics.

== History of the diocese ==
The cathedral of Acerra was originally dedicated to Saint Michael the Archangel.

The cathedral was administered and served by a Chapter, composed of three dignities (the Archpriest, the Cantor, and the Primicerius) and fifteen Canons.

In 1818, a new concordat with the Kingdom of the Two Sicilies committed the pope to the suppression of more than fifty small dioceses in the kingdom. The ecclesiastical province of Naples was spared from any suppressions, but the diocese of Sant' Agata de' Goti, which had not had a bishop in two decades, and the diocese of Acerra, which was very small in territory, population, and income, came under scrutiny. Pope Pius VII, in the bull "De Utiliori" of 27 June 1818, chose to unite the two dioceses under the leadership of one bishop, aeque principaliter. In the same concordat, the King was confirmed in the right to nominate candidates for vacant bishoprics, subject to the approval of the pope. That situation persisted down until the final overthrow of the Bourbon monarchy in 1860.

In a bull of 30 November 1854, Pope Pius IX separated the diocese of Acerra and the diocese of S. Agata de' Goti, which had been joined under one bishop since 1818. In the bull, Pope Pius also transferred four communes from S. Agata to Acerra: Arienzo, San Felice, S. Maria a Vico, and Cervino and the farm of Forchia.

Along with the separation of the two dioceses and the redrawing of diocesan boundaries, Pope Pius granted the diocese of Acerra the use of the former Dominican house in S. Maria a Vico for its seminary. The new seminary had its formal inauguration on 15 June 1857.

== Bishops of Acerra ==
=== Through 1500 ===
...

- Girardo (attested 1098, 1114)
- Ignotus (attested 1139)

...

- Bartolomeo (attested 1179)

...

- Romanus (12th cent.)

...

- Gentile (1242–?)

...

- Tommaso (1284–1302)

...

- Gentile (1307–1308)
- Guglielmo (attested 1310)
- ? Giovanni D'Esertelle, O. Cist. (1316– ? )
- ? Spanus (attested 1325)

[Pietro, O.F.M. (1331)]

- Filippo (1331 Died)
- Giovanni, O.F.M. (1332–1342)
- Matteo di Castelpietro, O.F.M. (1342–1344)
- Enrico da Monte (Henricus de Monte), O.P. (1344–1348)
- Ranieri (Raynerius) (1348–1354)
- Federico (1356–1362)
- Giovanni (1363–1394)
- ? Benedetto da Ascoli, O.E.S.A. (?–1389 Died) Avignon Obedience?
- Tommaso (1394–1403)
- Angelo de Consilio (Angelo de Conciliis) (1403–1429 Died).
- Filippo (1429–1434)
- Nicola de Utino, O.P. (1434–1439 Died)
- Nicola Descari (1439–1451)
- Bertrando (1451–1452)
- Leone Cortese (1452–1496 Died)
- Roberto de Noya (Noja), O.P. (1497–1504)

=== 1500 to 1700 ===
- Nicolaus de Noya, O.P. (1504–1511 Died)
- Vincenzo de Corbis (1511–1512)
- Juan de Vich, O.P. (1512–1526 Died)
- Carlo degli Ariosti (1527–1532 Died)

Gianvincenzo Carafa (1535–1539) Administrator

- Pietro Paolo de Thisis (1539–1554 Died)

Paulus Riccardus Aversanus (1554) Bishop-elect

- Gianfrancesco Sanseverino (1556–1560 Resigned)
- Giovanni Fabrizio Sanseverino (1560–1568)
- Juan Vázquez Coronado de Sayás (1568–1571 Died)
- Scipione Salernitano (1571–1581)
- Marcello Maiorana, C.R. (1581–1586 Died)
- Giovanni Battista del Tufo, C.R. (1587–1603 Resigned)
- Juan Gurrea (1603–1606 Died)
- Vincenzo Pagano, C.R. (1606–1644 Died)
- Mansueto Merati, B. (1644–1662 Died)
- Placido Carafa, C.R. (1663–1672 Died)
- Carlo de Angelis (1674–1690 Died)
- Carolus de Tilly (1692–1697 Appointed, Bishop of Monopoli)
- Giuseppe Rodoero (1697–1699 Died)

=== 1700 to present ===
- Benito Noriega, O.F.M. (28 May 1700 – Mar 1708 Died)
- Giuseppe Maria Positano, O.P. (1717–1723)
- Domenico Antonio Berretti (11 Jun 1725 – 16 Apr 1761 Died)
- Ciro degli Altieri (1761–1775)
- Gennaro Giordano (20 May 1776 – Feb 1789 Died)
- Gian Leonardo Maria Di Fusco, O.P. (27 Feb 1792 – 1795 Died)
- Orazio Magliola (18 Dec 1797 – 3 Jan 1829 Died)
- Emanuele Maria Bellorado, O.P. (18 May 1829 – 29 Oct 1833 Died)
- Taddeo Garzilli (Garzillo) (20 Jan 1834 – 5 Mar 1848 Died)
- Francesco Javarone (1849–1854)
- Giuseppe Gennaro Romano (23 Mar 1855 – 26 Mar 1864 Died)
- Giacinto Magliuolo (23 Feb 1872 – 1899 Died)
- Francesco De Pietro (14 Dec 1899 – 28 Jan 1932 Retired)
- Nicola Capasso (13 Mar 1933 – 16 Feb 1966 Retired)
- Antonio Riboldi, I.C. (25 Jan 1978 – 7 Dec 1999 Retired)
- Salvatore Giovanni Rinaldi (7 Dec 1999 – 18 Sep 2013 Retired)
- Antonio Di Donna (18 Sep 2013 – )

== Bibliography ==
=== Reference works ===
- Gams, Pius Bonifatius (1873). Series episcoporum Ecclesiae catholicae: quotquot innotuerunt a beato Petro apostolo. Ratisbon: Typis et Sumptibus Georgii Josephi Manz. p. 844-845. (Use with caution; obsolete)
- Eubel, Conradus, ed. (1913). Hierarchia catholica (in Latin). Vol. Tomus 1 (second ed.). Münster: Libreria Regensbergiana. (in Latin)
- Eubel, Conradus, ed. (1914). Hierarchia catholica (in Latin). Vol. Tomus 2 (second ed.). Münster: Libreria Regensbergiana.
- Eubel, Conradus; Gulik, Guilelmus, eds. (1923). Hierarchia catholica (in Latin). Vol. Tomus 3 (second ed.). Münster: Libreria Regensbergiana.
- Gauchat, Patritius (Patrice) (1935). Hierarchia catholica. Vol. Tomus IV (1592-1667). Münster: Libraria Regensbergiana.
- Ritzler, Remigius; Sefrin, Pirminus (1952). Hierarchia catholica medii et recentis aevi. Vol. Tomus V (1667-1730). Patavii: Messagero di S. Antonio.
- Ritzler, Remigius; Sefrin, Pirminus (1958). Hierarchia catholica medii et recentis aevi. Vol. Tomus VI (1730-1799). Patavii: Messagero di S. Antonio.
- Ritzler, Remigius; Sefrin, Pirminus (1968). Hierarchia Catholica medii et recentioris aevi (in Latin). Vol. VII (1800–1846). Monasterii: Libreria Regensburgiana.
- Remigius Ritzler; Pirminus Sefrin (1978). Hierarchia catholica Medii et recentioris aevi (in Latin). Vol. VIII (1846–1903). Il Messaggero di S. Antonio.
- Pięta, Zenon (2002). Hierarchia catholica medii et recentioris aevi (in Latin). Vol. IX (1903–1922). Padua: Messagero di San Antonio. ISBN 978-88-250-1000-8.

=== Studies ===
- Capasso, Gaetano (1968). Cultura e religiosità ad Aversa nei secoli XVIII-XIX-XX.: (Contributo bio-bibliografico alla storia ecclesiastica meridionale) (in Italian). Naples: Athena mediterranea.
- Caporale, Gaetano (1890). Memorie storico-diplomatiche della città di Acerra e dei conti che la tennero in feudo (in Italian). Naples: Jovene.
- Caporale, Gaetano (1893). Ricerche archeologiche, topografiche e biografiche su la diocesi di Acerra (in Italian). Naples: N. Jovene.
- Cappelletti, Giuseppe (1864). Le chiese d'Italia: dalla loro origine sino ai nostri giorni : opera (in Italian). Vol. decimonono (19). Venice: G. Antonelli. pp. 537–548.
- Kehr, Paul Fridolin (1925). Italia pontificia Vol. VIII (Berlin: Weidmann 1925), pp. 476–477. (in Latin)
- Ughelli, Ferdinando; Coleti, Niccolo (1720). Italia sacra sive De episcopis Italiæ, et insularum adjacentium (in Latin). Vol. Tomus sextus (6). Venice: apud Sebastianum Coleti. pp. 445–451.
