= Archdiocese of L'Aquila =

Latin Catholic archdiocese in Italy

Coordinates: 42.3491°N 13.3972°E

Archdiocese of L'Aquila Archidioecesis Aquilana

Catholic
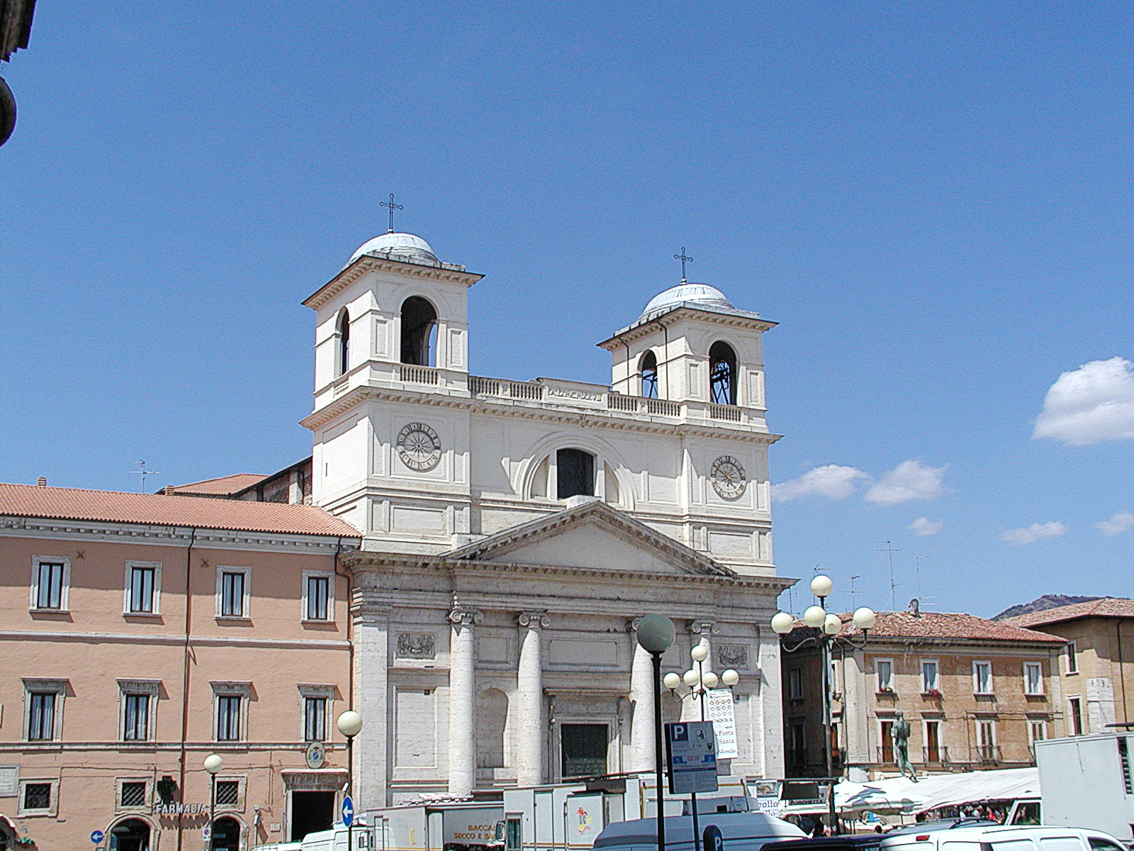
- L'Aquila Cathedral

Location
- Country: Italy
- Ecclesiastical province: L'Aquila

Statistics
- Area: 1,516 km^{2} (585 sq mi)
- Population: Total; Catholics: (as of 2023); 117,500 (est.); 112,720 (guess) ▲
- Parishes: 147 ▼

Information
- Denomination: Catholic Church
- Sui iuris church: Latin Church
- Rite: Roman Rite
- Established: 20 February 1257
- Cathedral: Cattedrale di SS. Massimo e Giorgio
- Secular priests: 83 (diocesan) ▼30 (Religious Orders) ▲8 Permanent Deacons

Current leadership
- Pope: Leo XIV
- Archbishop: Antonio D'Angelo
- Bishops emeritus: Giuseppe Molinari; Giuseppe Petrocchi

Map
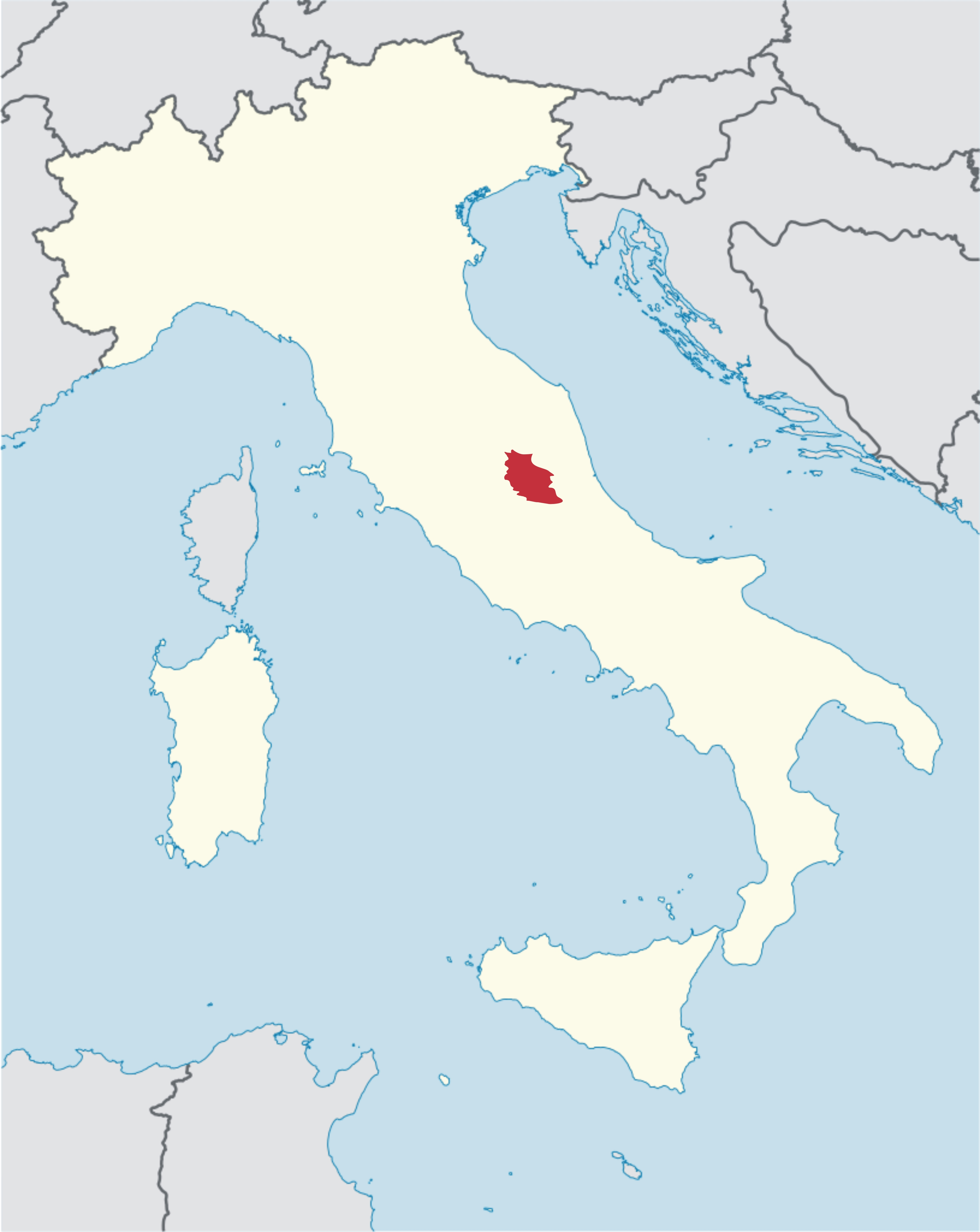

Website
- www.diocesilaquila.it (in Italian)

The Archdiocese of L'Aquila (Latin: Archidioecesis Aquilana) is a Latin archdiocese of the Catholic Church in Italy. It was erected as the Diocese of Aquila on 20 February 1257 by Pope Alexander IV and promoted to an archdiocese by Pope Pius IX on 19 January 1876. Pope Paul VI elevated it to the rank of a metropolitan archdiocese on 15 August 1972, with the suffragan sees of Avezzano and Sulmona–Valva.

The archdiocese's mother church and the seat of its archbishop is the Cattedrale di SS. Massimo e Giorgio. L'Aquila also contains the Basilica of San Bernardino da Siena, which was granted the honorific title of minor basilica by Pope Pius XII, in an Apostolic Letter "Uberrimos Sane Gratiae" of 20 May 1946. It also contains the church of S. Maria di Collemagio, which was begun in 1283, and consecrated on 25 August 1288.

== History ==
In 1187, in preparation for the crusade, a list of feudal military obligations was drawn up for the use of agents of William II of Sicily. The bishop of Forcono, whose name was Berardus, owed three soldiers for his various fiefs.

Bishop Berardus of Forcona was consecrated on 23 May 1252, by Cardinal Raynaldus dei Conti, who became Pope Alexander IV on 12 December 1254. His diocese was having administrative problems.

=== Creation of city and diocese ===
On 6 May 1253, the population of Amiterno and Forcona petitioned the royal councillor Tfommaso da Marerio, to use his influence to have the construction of the new city of Aquilae to be undertaken. In May 1254, Conrad IV, the son of Frederick II, replied with a diploma authorizing the construction, and the destruction of all the castles and fortifications inside the boundaries of the city; free immigration to the new city was granted, so long as people indemnified their former feudal lords. He was frank about his motives. The creation of the city would disconcert the barons of the valley of Aquila who were neglectful of their feudal duties; it would intimidate the rebellious vassals of the Kingdom of Sicily; it would strengthen his northern border against his enemies, one of whom was the pope, who had excommunicated him and was refusing his offers for a peace.

Pope Alexander had obtained information from letters of Pope Innocent IV and of papal legates that the Chapter of the cathedral of Forcona was violation of canon law. On 15 March 1255, therefore, he wrote to the Archpriest Master Angelo, who was a papal chaplain, and the Chapter, pointing out that the number of canons (in the sense of members of the chapter) exceeded the canonical upper limit. Some canons, appointed by special mandate of the Holy See, should only be admitted to the privileges of the canonicate when an existing canon resigned or died. Moreover, the appointees must be in Holy Orders.

On 22 December 1256, Pope Alexander IV wrote to the podestà, council, and commune of L'Aquila, who were requesting that, since the towns of Forcona and Amiternum were almost completely deserted, to the advantage of L'Aquila, and since the people of L'Aquila had recently completely rebuilt the church of Ss. Maximus and George, it be made a cathedral by papal authority. Pope Alexander agreed to their request, after consultation with his advisors, and with the concurrence of Bishop Berardus and the Archpriest and canons of the (former) cathedral of Forcona, and transferred the seat of the bishops of Forcona to the cathedral of Ss. Maximus and George in L'Aquila. The same papal bull was reissued on 20 February 1257, with the addition of language delimiting the boundaries of the diocese.

In 1259, the city of Aquila was destroyed by the forces of Manfred, King of Sicily, and the people and their bishop retreated to Focaro. Pope Clement IV (1265–1268) was not eager to see the city rebuilt, a city so associated with the determination of the Hohenstaufen to control the papacy. He therefore supported the local barons, and wrote, probably in 1265, to the new King of Sicily, Charles of Anjou, that the barons were crying out for help against the reemergence of Aquila, and urging the king to take their side. Charles I, however, saw the same advantages as Conrad IV as King of Sicily, and he therefore promoted the reestablishment of Aquila. He was even called the "Reformator". His actions were made easier by the defeat and death of Manfred at the Battle of Benevento on 26 February 1266. Pope Clement gave in, and appointed a new bishop for Aquila on 31 December 1267.

=== Papal coronation ===
After Pope Nicholas IV died on 6 April 1292, it was twenty-seven months before the eleven cardinals were able to assemble and agree upon his successor: a somewhat elongated process of election. On 5 July 1294, at Perugia, they elected the relatively unknown 85-year-old Pietro del Murrone, a former Benedictine monk, who had established his own religious order, which came to be called the Celestines. He was not a cardinal, and had recently been living as a recluse in the mountains to the east of Aquila. He enjoyed the patronage and protection of Charles II of Sicily, and was unwilling to go to Perugia where the election was being conducted, or even to enter the Papal States.

Pietro (later to be called Celestine V) came to Aquila on 28 July 1194. He was enthroned as pope on 29 August 1294, at the church of Santa Maria di Collemaggio, which had been built and was administered by his followers.

On 18 September 1294, while still residing at Aquila, Pope Celestine appointed twelve new cardinals. These included two natives of Aquila: Tommaso d'Ocra de Apruntio, a member of the pope's own religious order, Cardinal Priest of Santa Cecilia in Trastevere (died in 1300); and Pietro d'Aquila OSB, the bishop-elect of Valva-Sulmona, who became the Cardinal Priest of Santa Croce in Gerusalemme (died in 1298).

Celestine V finally departed Aquila on 6 October, heading for the monastery of Santo Spirito near Sulmona. He took up residence in Naples on 13 November 1294.

=== 14th century ===
In 1363, a pestilence struck the county and city of Aquila, resulting in the death of 10,000 persons, according to Niccolò di Borbona.

In 1378, a contested papal election in Rome in April and in Anagni in September, produced two popes: respectively, Urban VI and Clement VII. Queen Joanna I of Naples supported Pope Clement. Bishop Giovanni Zacchei (1377–1381) of Aquila chose to support Clement VII, and ordered public festivals to celebrate his accession. Around 20 November, on the orders of Urban VI, Ciccantonio di Pretatto entered Aquila in the middle of the night, with armed troops and some 500 cavalry, and engaged in violent confrontation with the citizens in the piazza of the merchants. Urban's stated motive was "to fortify the Kingdom". The death of Queen Joanna in May 1382 changed the situation. The death of Urban VI in 1389 more radically affected the situation.

=== Reorganization ===
Following the Second Vatican Council, and in accordance with the norms laid out in the council's decree, Christus Dominus (chapter 40), Pope Paul VI ordered a reorganization of the ecclesiastical provinces in southern Italy. On 15 August 1972, a new ecclesiastical province was created, with L'Aquila (which had previously been directly subject to the Holy See) as the new metropolitan archbishopric. The diocese of the Marsi (later renamed Avezzano) and the diocese of Valva e Sulmona were appointed suffragans.

=== Earthquakes ===
In the earthquake of 3 December 1315, the cathedral of Aquila was destroyed. Bishop Filippo Delci (1312–1327) is credited with rebuilding it from the ground up.

The third large earthquake of 2 February 1703 damaged the entire city of Aquila, especially the castle, the Palazzo Publico, the cathedral, and the church of S. Bernardino. It resulted in more than 2,500 casualties. The 1915 Avezzano earthquake destroyed 96% of the city of Avezzano and severely damaged much of the province of Aquila; there were estimated to be 30,000 deaths directly caused by the tremors.

The city and diocese of L'Aquila suffered another devastating earthquake in 2009. The dome, triumphal arch, and transept of the church of Santa Maria di Collemaggio collapsed, and it is said that the remains of Pope Celestine V were thrown from their tomb.

== Bishops and Archbishops of L'Aquila ==
=== Before 1256 ===
- Raniero de Forcona (died 1077), Bishop of Forcona (the bishopric later moved to L'Aquila)

=== 1256 to 1599 ===
- Berardo da Padula (1256–1264)
- Niccolò Sinizzo, O.Cist. (1267–1294)
- Nicola Castroceli, O.P. (1294–1303)
- Bartolomeo Conti (1303–1312)
- Filippo Delci, O.E.S.A. (1312–1327)
- Angelo Acciaioli, O.P. (1328–1342)
- Pietro Guglielmi (1343–1346)
- Paolo Rainaldi (1349–1377)
- Isacco D'Arcione (1353–1355)
- Giovanni Zacchei (1377–1381)
- Stefano Sidonio (1381–1382) Avignon Obedience
- Bernardus de Teramo, O.P. (1382–1392) Avignon Obedience
- Clemente Secinari (1382–1384) Roman Obedience
- Oddo (1386–1388) Roman Obedience
- Ludovico Cola (1389–1399) Roman Obedience

Corrado Camponeschi (1397–1400) Administrator

- Giacomo Donadei (1392–1400–1431) Avignon Obedience
- Amico Agnifili (1431–1472)
- Francesco Agnifili (1472–1476)
- Ludovico Borgio (1477–1485)
- Giovanbattista Gaglioffi (1486–1491)
- Giovanni Di Leone (1493–1502)
- Gualtiero Suardo (1502–1504)
- Giovanni Dominici, O.S.A. (1504–1515?)
- Francesco Franchi (1517–1523)

Giovanni Piccolomini (1523–1525) Administrator
Pompeo Colonna (1525–1532) Administrator
Giovanni Piccolomini (1532–1538) Administrator

- Bernardo Sancio (1538–1552)
- Alvaro Della Quadra (1553–1561)
- Giovanni D'Acugna (1561–1579))
- Mariano De Racciaccaris, O.F.M.Obs. (1579–1592)
- Basilio Pignatelli (1593–1599)

=== 1600 to 1900 ===
- Giuseppe de Rossi (1599–1605)
- Gundisalvo De Rueda (1606–1622)
- Álvaro de Mendoza, O.F.M.Obs. (1622–1628)
- Gaspare De Gaioso (1629–1644)
- Clemente Del Pezzo (1646–1651)
- Francesco Tellio De Leon (1654–1662)
- Carlo De Angelis (1663–1674)
- Giovanni de Torrecilla y Cárdenas (1676–1681)
- Arcangelo Tipaldi, O.F.M. (1681–1682)
- Ignazio Della Zerda, O.E.S.A. (1683–1702)
- Domenico Taglialatela (1718–1742)
- Giuseppe Coppola (1742–1749)
- Ludovico Sabatini (1750–1776)
- Benedetto Cervone (1777–1788)
- Francesco Saverio Gualtieri (1792–1817)
- Girolamo Manieri (1818–1844)
- Michele Navazio (1845–1852)
- Luigi Filippi (1853–1881)
- Augusto Antonio Vicentini (1881–1892)

=== since 1900 ===
- Francesco Paolo Carrano (1893–1906)
- Peregrin-François Stagni, SM (1907–1916)
- Adolfo Turchi (1918–1929)
- Gaudenzio Manuelli (1931–1941)
- Carlo Confalonieri (1941–1950)
- Costantino Stella (1950–1973)
- Carlo Martini (1973–1983)
- Mario Peressin (1983–1998)
- Giuseppe Molinari (1998–2013)
- Cardinal Giuseppe Petrocchi (2013–2024)
- Antonio D'Angelo (2024–present)

== See also ==
- Timeline of L'Aquila
- Maximus of Aquila
- Roman Catholic Diocese of Avezzano (until 1986, "Diocese of the Marsi"")
- Roman Catholic Diocese of Sulmona-Valva
- List of Catholic dioceses in Italy
- Catholic Church in Italy
- Palazzo Arcivescovile (L'Aquila)

== Bibliography ==
=== Episcopal lists ===
- Eubel, Conradus, ed. (1913). Hierarchia catholica (in Latin). Vol. I (second ed.). Münster: Libreria Regensbergiana.
- Eubel, Conradus, ed. (1914). Hierarchia catholica (in Latin). Vol. II (second ed.). Münster: Libreria Regensbergiana.
- Eubel, Conradus; Gulik, Guilelmus (1923). Hierarchia catholica (in Latin). Vol. III (second ed.). Münster: Libreria Regensbergiana.
- Gams, Pius Bonifatius (1873). Series episcoporum Ecclesiae catholicae: quotquot innotuerunt a beato Petro apostolo (in Latin). Ratisbon: Typis et Sumptibus Georgii Josephi Manz. pp. 850–851.
- Gauchat, Patritius (Patrice) (1935). Hierarchia catholica (in Latin). Vol. IV (1592-1667). Münster: Libraria Regensbergiana.
- Ritzler, Remigius; Sefrin, Pirminus (1952). Hierarchia catholica medii et recentis aevi (in Latin). Vol. V (1667-1730). Patavii: Messagero di S. Antonio.
- Ritzler, Remigius; Sefrin, Pirminus (1958). Hierarchia catholica medii et recentis aevi (in Latin). Vol. VI (1730-1799). Patavii: Messagero di S. Antonio.
- Ritzler, Remigius; Sefrin, Pirminus (1968). Hierarchia Catholica medii et recentioris aevi (in Latin). Vol. VII (1800–1846). Monasterii: Libreria Regensburgiana.
- Remigius Ritzler; Pirminus Sefrin (1978). Hierarchia catholica Medii et recentioris aevi (in Latin). Vol. VIII (1846–1903). Il Messaggero di S. Antonio.
- Pięta, Zenon (2002). Hierarchia catholica medii et recentioris aevi (in Latin). Vol. IX (1903–1922). Padua: Messagero di San Antonio. ISBN 978-88-250-1000-8.

=== Studies ===
- Cappelletti, Giuseppe (1870). Le chiese d'Italia dalla loro origine sino ai nostri giorni (in Italian). Vol. vigesimoprimo (21). Venezia: Antonelli. pp. 416–424.
- Casalboni, Andrea (2014). "La fondazione della città di L'Aquila." L'Aquila. Sunto della tesi magistrale, l'articolo è stato pubblicato sulla rivista Eurostudium, nel numero di gennaio-marzo 2014: http://www.eurostudium.eu/rivista/archivio/2014-01-03-N30.php
- D'Avino, Vincenzio (1848). Cenni storici sulle chiese arcivescovili, vescovili, e prelatizie (nullius) del regno delle due Sicilie (in Italian). Naples: dalle stampe di Ranucci. pp. 21–29. [article by Canon Bonanno de Sanctis]
- Lanzoni, Francesco (1927). Le diocesi d'Italia dalle origini al principio del secolo VII (an. 604). Faenza: F. Lega. (in Italian) pp. 363–370.
- Leosini, Angelo (1848). Monumenti storici artistici della città di Aquila e suoi contorni: colle notizie de' pittori, scultori, architetti ed altri artefici che vi fiorirono. (in Italian). Aquila: Francesco Perchiazzi, 1848.
- Muratori, Lodovico Antonio (1742). Antiquitates Italicae Medii Aevi: sive dissertationes... omnia illustrantur, et confirmantur ingenti copia diplomatum et chartarum veterum, nunc primùm ex Archivis Italiae depromtarum, additis etiam nummis, chronicis, aliisque monumentis numquam antea editis. Volume 6. Milan: ex typographia Societatis Palatinae, 1742.
- Murri, Filippo (1996). Monasteri, conventi, case e istituti religiosi dell'arcidiocesi aquilana. (in Italian). L'Aquila: Arcidiocesi 1996.
- Murri, Filippo (1997). Vescovi ed arcivescovi dell'Aquila. (in Italian). L'Aquila 1997.
- Schwartz, Gerhard (1907). Die Besetzung der Bistümer Reichsitaliens unter den sächsischen und salischen Kaisern: mit den Listen der Bischöfe, 951-1122. (in German) Leipzig: B.G. Teubner. pp. 280–281 (Furconia).
- Signorini, Angelo (1868), La diocesi di Aquila descritta ed illustrata: studio. (in Italian). Volume 1 Aquila: Stabilimento Tipografico Grossi, 1868. Vol. II.
- Ughelli, Ferdinando; Coleti, Niccolò (1717). Italia sacra sive De Episcopis Italiae, et insularum adjacentium (in Latin). Vol. Tomus primus (1) (editio secunda, aucta et emendata ed.). Venice: apud Sebastianum Coleti. pp. 373–394.. Vol. X, pp. 105–106.

==== External links ====
- Chiesa di L'Aquila. Official site (in Italian)
- "Aquila, L’." Enciclopedia on line. (in Italian) Retrieved: 22 December 2022.
- Cheney, David M. Catholic-Hierarchy
- Chow, Gabriel. GCatholic.org
- (in Italian)Index of a history of L'Aquila, mentioning Arch Bishops
