= Selvaggio Primitelli =

Italian Roman Catholic prelate

Most Reverend Selvaggio Primitelli
- Bishop of Lavello
- Church: Catholic Church
- Diocese: Diocese of Lavello
- In office: 1613–1615
- Predecessor: Leone Fedeli
- Successor: Vincenzo Periti

Orders
- Consecration: 24 February 1613 by Giovanni Garzia Mellini

Personal details
- Died: 1615 Lavello, Italy

Selvaggio Primitelli (died 1615) was a Roman Catholic prelate who served as Bishop of Lavello (1613–1615).

== Biography ==
On 11 February 1613, Selvaggio Primitelli was appointed during the papacy of Pope Paul V as Bishop of Lavello. On 24 February 1613, he was consecrated bishop by Giovanni Garzia Mellini, Cardinal-Priest of Santi Quattro Coronati with Decio Caracciolo Rosso, Archbishop of Bari-Canosa, and Antonio d'Aquino, Bishop of Sarno, serving as co-consecrators. He served as Bishop of Lavello until his death in 1615.

== External links and additional sources ==
- Cheney, David M. "Diocese of Lavello". Catholic-Hierarchy.org. (Chronology of Bishops) ^{[self-published]}
- Chow, Gabriel. "Titular Episcopal See of Lavello". GCatholic.org. (Chronology of Bishops) ^{[self-published]}

Catholic Church titles
Preceded by Leone Fedeli	Bishop of Lavello; 1613–1615	Succeeded by Vincenzo Periti
