= Roman Catholic Diocese of Castro di Puglia =

The Diocese of Castro di Puglia (Latin: Dioecesis Castrensis in Apulia) was a Roman Catholic diocese located in the town of Castro of Lecce in the Apulia region of south-eastern Italy. In 1818, it was suppressed to the Archdiocese of Otranto. In 1968, it was restored as the titular see of Castro and then in 1976, as the titular see of Castro di Puglia.

== History ==
The bishopric of Castro was founded by Pope Leo II in 682. In the 9th century, it is mentioned as a suffragan of the Metropolitan of Santa Severina, but in the 12th century it came under the jurisdiction of the Archbishopric of Otranto. In the 16th century, Castro was destroyed by the Turks and the bishop moved his residence to Poggiardo in 1572. The diocese was suppressed and its territory of the diocese was added to that of Otranto on 27 June 1818, its Metropolitan.

== Bishops ==
incomplete yet; first centuries unavailable

- Petureio (1179 – ?)
- Pellegrino (? – 1254)
- Pellegrino (? – 1295)
- Giovanni Parisi (1295–1296)
- Rufino, Dominican Order (O.P.) (1296.08.09 – ?)
- Luca, O.P. (later Archbishop) (1303.11.08 – 1321.01.30), later Metropolitan Archbishop of Otranto (Italy) (1321.01.30 – death 1329)
- Giacomo (1321.10.16 – ?)
- Francesco (1347.02.19 – ?)
- Pietro Masseri, Friars Minor (O.F.M.) (1361.08.09 – ?)
- Donadio (1366.06.04 –death 1387)
- Antonio da Viterbo (1387.01.12 – 1389.12.17), later Bishop of Lecce (Italy) (1389.12.17 – ?)
- uncanonical Nicola Bonanno (1389.09.24 – ?)
- Geroaldo (1390.03.19 – death 1390), previously Bishop of Ariano (Italy) (1382 – 1390.03.19)
- Leonardo (1391.02.27 – death 1402)
- Berengario (1402.02.27 – death 1429), previously Bishop of Alessano (? – 1402.02.27)
- Urbano, O.F.M. (1429.03.02 – ?)
- Nicola de Pineo (1453.03.18 – death 1483)
- Stazio de Vera (1483.04.09 – death 1491)
- Giorgio, Benedictine Order (O.S.B.) (1491.06.12 – 1503), previously Bishop of Satriano (? – 1491.06.12)
- Donato Strineo (1503.07.22 – 1504.01.08), later Bishop of Ischia (Italy) (1504.01.08 – death 1534)
- Bernardino de Leis, C.R.L. (1504–1504 Appointed, Bishop of Lavello)
- Bernardino Scannafora (1504–1529 Died)
- Angelo Gaconia (1530–1565 Died)
- Luca Antonio Resta (1565–1578 Appointed, Bishop of Nicotera)
- Giulio Ottinelli (1578–1587 Appointed, Bishop of Fano)
- Mario Farullo, O.F.M. Conv. (1587–1594 Died)
- Camillo Borghese (archbishop) (1594–1600 Appointed, Bishop of Montalcino)
- Placido Fava, O.S.B. (1600–1604 Appointed, Bishop of Telese o Cerreto Sannita)
- Antonio Bornio (1604–1614 Died)
- Carlo Bornio (1614–1627 Died)
- Giovanni Battista Deti (Deto) (1627–1630 Appointed, Bishop of Anglona-Tursi)
- Dionisio Tomacelli, O. Carm. (1631–1642 Died)
- Francesco Colonna (bishop) (1642–1653 Died)
- Annibale Sillano (1653–1666 Died)
- Francescantonio de Marco (1666–1681 Died)
- Francesco Maria Caffori (Cafferi) (1681–1681 Died)
- Giovanni Bernardo Capreoli (1683–1712 Died)
- Giovanni Battista Costantino (1718–1749 Died)
- Domenico de Amato (1750–1769 Died)
- Agostino Gorgoni (1770–1790 Died)
- Francesco Antonio Duca (1792–1810 Died)

== Titular see ==
Castro di Puglia, no longer being a residential bishopric, has been listed by the Catholic Church as a titular see since its nominal restoration in 1968. It was initially listed simply as Castro, but since 1976 as Castro di Puglia to avoid confusion with other sees named Castro.

It has had the following incumbents, of both the lowest (episcopal) and the intermediary (archiepiscopal) ranks:

- Titular Archbishop Peter Seiichi Shirayanagi (ペトロ白柳誠一) (1969.11.15–1970.02.21), as Coadjutor Archbishop of Tokyo 東京 (Japan) (1969.11.15–1970.02.21), succeeding as Metropolitan Archbishop of Tokyo 東京 (1970.02.21–2000.02.17), President of Catholic Bishops’ Conference of Japan (1983–1992), created Cardinal-Priest of S. Emerenziana a Tor Fiorenza (1994.11.26–2009.12.30); previously Titular Bishop of Atenia (1966.03.15–1969.11.15) and Auxiliary Bishop of Tokyo 東京 (1966.03.15–1969.11.15)
- Titular Bishop Richard John Sklba (1979.11.06– ), Auxiliary Bishop emeritus of Milwaukee (USA)

== See also ==
- Catholic Church in Italy
