= Boncore =

Boncore is a surname. Notable people with this surname include:

- Giuseppe Boncore (fl. 1652–died 1687), Italian Roman Catholic bishop
- John Boncore (1952–2013), American activist and actor of partial Native American descent
- Joseph Boncore (fl. 2009–present), American lawyer and politician
