= Francesco Colonna =

Francesco Colonna may refer to:

- Francesco Colonna (writer) (1433–1527), Italian Dominican priest and monk credited with the authorship of the Hypnerotomachia Poliphili
- Francesco Colonna (bishop) (1597–1653), Roman Catholic prelate who served as Bishop of Castro di Puglia (1642–1653)
