= Roman Catholic Diocese of Salpi =

The Diocese of Salpi or Diocese of Salapia (Latin: Dioecesis Salpensis) was a Roman Catholic diocese located in the Italian town of Salpi in Daunia near Cerignola and Manfredonia. In 1547, the diocese was suppressed and its territory assigned to the Archdiocese of Trani. It was restored as a titular see in 1966.

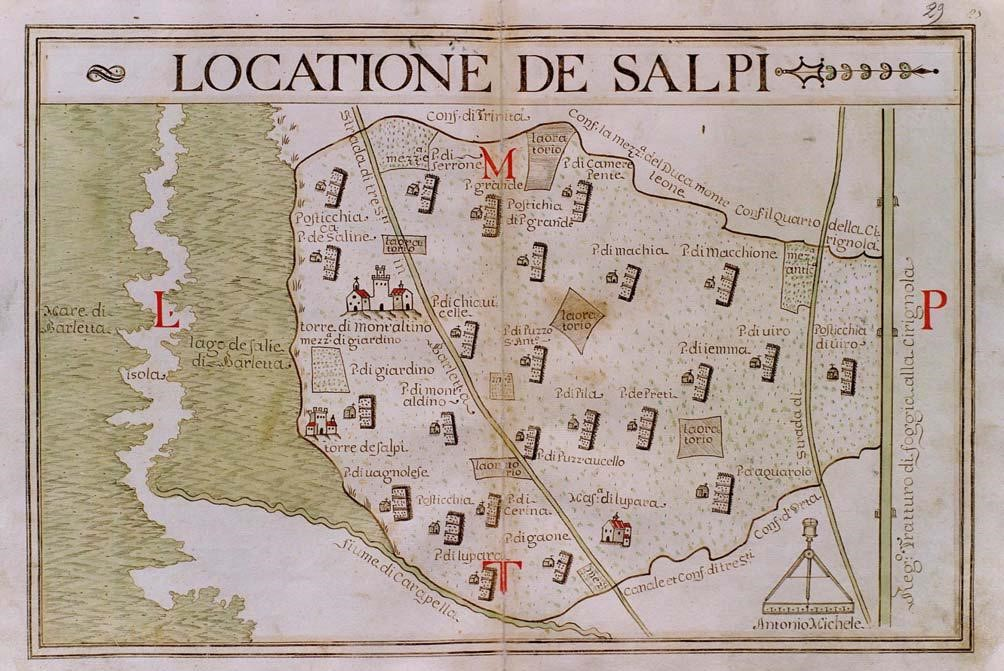
Location of Salpi

== History ==
- 450?: Erected as Diocese of Salpi
- 1424: Suppressed to the Archdiocese of Trani
- 1523: Restored as the Diocese of Salpi from the Archdiocese of Trani
- 1547 April 22: Suppressed to the Archdiocese of Trani
- 1966: Restored as the Titular Episcopal See of Salpi

== Bishops of Salpi ==
Erected: 450
Latin Name: Salpensis
Metropolitan: Archdiocese of Bari (-Canosa)

- Guillermus Ludovicus, O.S.B., former monk of St Paul of Cormery and chaplan in Nicomedia (attested around 1101 or 1102)
- Nicolas Antonio (bishop), O.P. (22 Apr 1422 Appointed – )

...

- Mario Hispanus (16 Mar 1523 – 1532 Died)
- Gaspar Flores (13 Nov 1532 – 1544 Died)
- Domenico Stella (Tommaso Stella), O.P. (9 May 1544 – 22 Apr 1547 Appointed, Bishop of Lavello)

1547: Suppressed to the Archdiocese of Trani
