= Bernardino Scannafora =

Italian Roman Catholic prelate

Most Reverend Bernardino Scannafora
- Bishop of Castro di Puglia
- Church: Catholic Church
- Diocese: Diocese of Castro di Puglia
- In office: 1504–1529
- Predecessor: Bernardino de Leis
- Successor: Angelo Gaconia
- Previous post: Bishop of Lavello (1504)

Personal details
- Died: 1529 Castro di Puglia, Italy

Bernardino Scannafora (died 1529) was a Roman Catholic prelate who served as Bishop of Castro di Puglia (1504–1529) and Bishop of Lavello (1504).

== Biography ==
On 1 January 1504, he was appointed during the papacy of Pope Julius II as Bishop of Lavello. On 19 January 1504, he was appointed during the papacy of Pope Julius II as Bishop of Castro di Puglia. He served as Bishop of Castro di Puglia until his death in 1529.

== External links and additional sources ==
- Cheney, David M. "Diocese of Lavello". Catholic-Hierarchy.org. (Chronology of Bishops) ^{[self-published]}
- Chow, Gabriel. "Titular Episcopal See of Lavello". GCatholic.org. (Chronology of Bishops) ^{[self-published]}
- Cheney, David M. "Diocese of Castro di Puglia". Catholic-Hierarchy.org. (Chronology of Bishops) ^{[self-published]}
- Chow, Gabriel. "Titular Episcopal See of Castro di Puglia (Italy)". GCatholic.org. (Chronology of Bishops) ^{[self-published]}

Catholic Church titles
Preceded by Giovanni de Manna	Bishop of Lavello; 1504	Succeeded by Bernardino de Leis
Preceded by Bernardino de Leis	Bishop of Castro di Puglia; 1504–1529	Succeeded by Angelo Gaconia
