= Diego della Quadra =

16th-century Italian Roman Catholic bishop

Most Reverend Diego della Quadra
- Bishop of Lavello
- Church: Catholic Church
- Diocese: Diocese of Lavello
- In office: 1602–1604
- Predecessor: Tiberio Cortesi
- Successor: Leone Fedeli

Personal details
- Died: 1604 Lavello, Italy

Diego della Quadra (died 1604) was a Roman Catholic prelate who served as Bishop of Lavello (1602–1604).

== Biography ==
On 26 June 1602, Diego della Quadra was appointed by Pope Clement VIII as Bishop of Lavello. He served as Bishop of Lavello until his death in 1604.

== External links and additional sources ==
- Cheney, David M. "Diocese of Lavello". Catholic-Hierarchy.org. (Chronology of Bishops) ^{[self-published]}
- Chow, Gabriel. "Titular Episcopal See of Lavello". GCatholic.org. (Chronology of Bishops) ^{[self-published]}

Catholic Church titles
Preceded by Tiberio Cortesi	Bishop of Lavello; 1602–1604	Succeeded by Leone Fedeli
