= Ascanio Libertano =

Most Reverend Ascanio Libertano
- Church: Catholic Church
- Diocese: Diocese of Cagli
- In office: 1591–1607
- Predecessor: Paolo Maria della Rovere
- Successor: Timocrate Aloigi

Orders
- Consecration: 4 August 1591 by Girolamo Bernerio

Personal details
- Died: 10 March 1607 Cagli, Italy

Ascanio Libertano (also Ascanio Libertani)(died 10 March 1607) was a Roman Catholic prelate who served as Bishop of Cagli (1591–1607).

== Biography ==
On 19 July 1591, Ascanio Libertano was appointed during the papacy of Pope Gregory XIV as Bishop of Cagli. On 4 August 1591, he was consecrated bishop by Girolamo Bernerio, Bishop of Ascoli Piceno, with Paolo Alberi, Archbishop Emeritus of Dubrovnik, and Leonard Abel, Titular Bishop of Sidon, serving as co-consecrators. He served as Bishop of Cagli until his death on 10 March 1607.

== External links and additional sources ==
- Cheney, David M. "Diocese of Cagli e Pergola". Catholic-Hierarchy.org.^{self-published}
- Chow, Gabriel. "Diocese of Cagli". GCatholic.org.^{self-published}

Catholic Church titles
Preceded by Paolo Maria della Rovere	Bishop of Cagli; 1591–1607	Succeeded by Timocrate Aloigi
