= Tommaso Stella =

Italian Roman Catholic prelate

Most Reverend Tommaso Stella
- Bishop of Capodistria
- Church: Catholic Church
- Diocese: Diocese of Capodistria
- In office: 1549–1566
- Predecessor: Pietro Paolo Vergerio
- Successor: Adriano Beretti
- Previous posts: Bishop of Salpi (1544–1547); Bishop of Lavello (1547–1549)

Personal details
- Died: 6 January 1566 Capodistria, Slovenia

Tommaso Stella, O.P. also Domenico Stella (died 1566) was a Roman Catholic prelate who served as Bishop of Capodistria (1549–1566), Bishop of Lavello (1547–1549), and Bishop of Salpi (1544–1547).

== Biography ==
Tommaso Stella was ordained a priest in the Order of Preachers. On 9 May 1544, he was appointed during the papacy of Pope Paul III as Bishop of Salpi. On 22 April 1547, he was appointed during the papacy of Pope Paul III as Bishop of Lavello. On 10 November 1549, he was appointed during the papacy of Pope Paul III as Bishop of Capodistria. He served as Bishop of Capodistria until his death on 6 January 1566.

== External links and additional sources ==
- Cheney, David M. "Diocese of Salpi (Salapia)". Catholic-Hierarchy.org. (for Chronology of Bishops) ^{[self-published]}
- Chow, Gabriel. "Titular Episcopal See of Salpi (Italy)". GCatholic.org. (for Chronology of Bishops) ^{[self-published]}
- Cheney, David M. "Diocese of Lavello". Catholic-Hierarchy.org. (Chronology of Bishops) ^{[self-published]}
- Chow, Gabriel. "Titular Episcopal See of Lavello". GCatholic.org. (Chronology of Bishops) ^{[self-published]}
- Cheney, David M. "Diocese of Capodistria (Capo d'Istria)(Koper)". Catholic-Hierarchy.org. (Chronology of Bishops) ^{[self-published]}
- Chow, Gabriel. "Diocese of Koper (Slovenia)". GCatholic.org. (Chronology of Bishops) ^{[self-published]}

Catholic Church titles
Preceded by Gaspar Flores	Bishop of Salpi; 1544–1547	Succeeded by None (diocese suppressed)
Preceded by Donato Martuccio	Bishop of Lavello; 1547–1549	Succeeded by Gian Pietro Ferretti
Preceded by Pietro Paolo Vergerio	Bishop of Capodistria; 1549–1566	Succeeded by Adriano Beretti
