= Castro Marina =

- Frazione
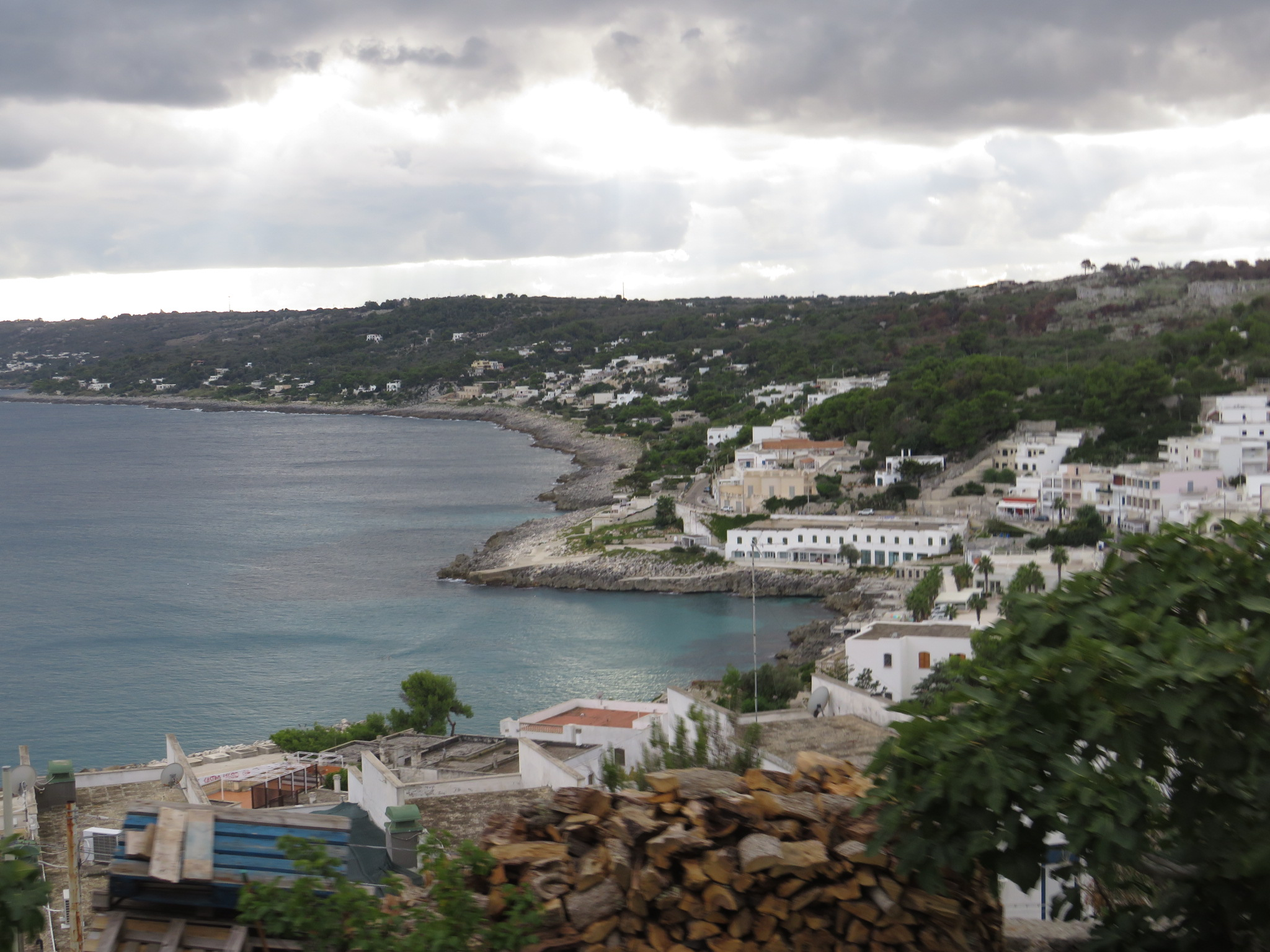

- Location of Castro Marina in Italy
- Coordinates: 40.002751°N 18.423133°E
- Country: Italy
- Region: Apulia
- Province: Lecce (LE)
- Comune: Acireale
- Time zone: UTC+1 (CET)
  - Summer (DST): UTC+2 (CEST)
- Postal code: 73030
- Dialing code: (+39) 0836

Castro Marina is a southern Italian frazione of Castro, a municipality part of the Province of Lecce, Apulia.

== Geography ==
Santa Tecla is located 1.36 kilometres (0.85 mi) from Castro, to which it belongs.
