= Benedetto Luperti =

{{Infobox Christian leader | type = Bishop | honorific_prefix = Most Reverend | name = Benedetto Luperti | title = Bishop of Cagli | other_names = | image = | image_size = | alt = | caption = | church = Catholic Church | archdiocese = | diocese = [[Roman Catholic Diocese of Cagli-Pergola[|Diocese of Cagli]] | see = | term = 1694–1709 | predecessor = Giulio Giacomo Castellani | successor = Alfonso De' Bellincini | ordination = | ordained_by = | consecration = 25 April 1694 | consecrated_by = Michelangelo Mattei | cardinal = | created_cardinal_by = | rank = | birth_date = 1629 | birth_place = Cagli, Italy | death_date = 23 September 1709 | death_place = Cagli, Italy | previous_post = | denomination = | ethnicity = }}

Benedetto Luperti (1629 – 23 September 1709) was a Roman Catholic prelate who served as Bishop of Cagli (1694–1709).

== Biography ==
Benedetto Luperti was born in Cagli, Italy in 1629. On 19 April 1694, he was appointed during the papacy of Pope Innocent XII as Bishop of Cagli. On 25 April 1694, he was consecrated bishop by Michelangelo Mattei, Titular Patriarch of Antioch, with Giuseppe Felice Barlacci, Bishop Emeritus of Narni, and Carlo Giuseppe Morozzo, Bishop of Bobbio, serving as co-consecrators. He served as Bishop of Cagli until his death on 23 September 1709.

== External links and additional sources ==
- Cheney, David M. "Diocese of Cagli e Pergola". Catholic-Hierarchy.org.^{self-published}
- Chow, Gabriel. "Diocese of Cagli". GCatholic.org.^{self-published}

Catholic Church titles
Preceded by Giulio Giacomo Castellani	Bishop of Cagli; 1694–1709	Succeeded by Alfonso De' Bellincini
