= Giulio Giacomo Castellani =

Roman Catholic Bishop

Most Reverend Giulio Giacomo Castellani
- Bishop of Cagli
- Church: Catholic Church
- Diocese: Diocese of Cagli
- In office: 1686–1694
- Predecessor: Andrea Tamantini
- Successor: Benedetto Luperti

Orders
- Consecration: 15 April 1686 by Alessandro Crescenzi (cardinal)

Personal details
- Born: 15 November 1619 Urbino, Italy
- Died: January 1694 (aged 74) Cagli, Italy

Giulio Giacomo Castellani, O.S.A. (15 November 1619 – January, 1694) was a Roman Catholic prelate who served as Bishop of Cagli (1686–1694).

== Biography ==
Giulio Giacomo Castellani was born in Urbino, Italy on 15 November 1619 and ordained a priest in the Order of Saint Augustine. On 1 April 1686, he was appointed during the papacy of Pope Innocent XI as Bishop of Cagli. On 15 April 1686, he was consecrated bishop by Alessandro Crescenzi (cardinal), Cardinal-Priest of Santa Prisca, with Francesco Casati, Titular Archbishop of Trapezus, and Marcantonio Barbarigo, Archbishop of Corfù, serving as co-consecrators. He served as Bishop of Cagli until his death in January 1694.

== See also ==
- Catholic Church in Italy

== External links and additional sources ==
- Cheney, David M. "Diocese of Cagli e Pergola". Catholic-Hierarchy.org.^{self-published}
- Chow, Gabriel. "Diocese of Cagli". GCatholic.org.^{self-published}

Catholic Church titles
Preceded by Andrea Tamantini	Bishop of Cagli; 1686–1694	Succeeded by Benedetto Luperti
