= Biagio Caropipe =

Italian Roman Catholic prelate

Most Reverend Biagio Caropipe
- Bishop of Telese o Cerreto Sannita
- Church: Catholic Church
- Diocese: Diocese of Telese o Cerreto Sannita
- In office: 1515–1524
- Predecessor: Andrea Riccio (bishop)
- Successor: Giovanni Gregorio Peroschi

Personal details
- Died: 10 July 1524 Italy

Biagio Caropipe (died 1524) was a Roman Catholic prelate who served as Bishop of Telese o Cerreto Sannita (1515–1524) in Campania, Italy.

== Biography ==
On 1 June 1515, Biagio Caropipe was appointed Bishop of Telese o Cerreto Sannita by Pope Leo X.

He served as Bishop of Telese o Cerreto Sannita until his death on 10 July 1524.

== External links and additional sources ==
- Cheney, David M. "Diocese of Cerreto Sannita-Telese-Sant'Agata de' Goti". Catholic-Hierarchy.org. (Chronology of Bishops) ^{[self-published]}
- Chow, Gabriel. "Diocese of Cerreto Sannita-Telese-Sant'Agata de' Goti". GCatholic.org. (Chronology of Bishops) ^{[self-published]}

Catholic Church titles
Preceded by Andrea Riccio (bishop)	Bishop of Telese o Cerreto Sannita; 1515–1524	Succeeded by Giovanni Gregorio Peroschi
