= Andrea Riccio (bishop) =

Italian Roman Catholic bishop (died 1515)

Most Reverend Andrea Riccio
- Bishop of Telese o Cerreto Sannita
- Church: Catholic Church
- Diocese: Diocese of Telese o Cerreto Sannita
- In office: 1505–1515
- Predecessor: Pietro Palagario
- Successor: Biagio Caropipe

Personal details
- Died: 1515 Italy

Andrea Riccio (died 1515) was a Roman Catholic prelate who served as Bishop of Telese o Cerreto Sannita (1505–1515).

== Biography ==
On 24 October 1505, Andrea Riccio was appointed during the papacy of Pope Julius II as Bishop of Telese o Cerreto Sannita. He served as Bishop of Telese o Cerreto Sannita until his death in 1515.

== External links and additional sources ==
- Cheney, David M. "Diocese of Cerreto Sannita-Telese-Sant'Agata de' Goti". Catholic-Hierarchy.org. (Chronology of Bishops) ^{[self-published]}
- Chow, Gabriel. "Diocese of Cerreto Sannita-Telese-Sant'Agata de' Goti". GCatholic.org. (Chronology of Bishops) ^{[self-published]}

Catholic Church titles
Preceded by Pietro Palagario	Bishop of Telese o Cerreto Sannita; 1505–1515	Succeeded by Biagio Caropipe
