= Stefano Capani =

Italian Roman Catholic prelate

Most Reverend Stefano Capani
- Bishop of Lavello
- Church: Catholic Church
- Diocese: Diocese of Lavello
- In office: 1463–1481
- Successor: Pietro Palagario

Personal details
- Died: 1481 Lavello, Italy

Stefano Capani (died 1481) was a Roman Catholic prelate who served as Bishop of Lavello (1463–1481).

== Biography ==
On 13 June 1463, Stefano Capani was appointed by Pope Pius II as Bishop of Lavello. He served as Bishop of Lavello until his death in 1481.

== See also ==
- Catholic Church in Italy

== External links and additional sources ==
- Cheney, David M. "Diocese of Lavello". Catholic-Hierarchy.org. (Chronology of Bishops) ^{[self-published]}
- Chow, Gabriel. "Titular Episcopal See of Lavello". GCatholic.org. (Chronology of Bishops) ^{[self-published]}

Catholic Church titles
Preceded by	Bishop of Lavello; 1463–1481	Succeeded by Pietro Palagario
