= Diocese of Minervino Murge =

Roman Catholic diocese in Italy (900-1818)

The Diocese of Minervino Murge was a Roman Catholic diocese in Italy, located in the Province of Barletta-Andria-Trani in the ecclesiastical province of Bari.

== History ==
900: Established as Diocese of Minervino (Italiano) / Minerbium

1818.06.27: Suppressed (to Diocese of Andria)

1968: Restored as Titular Episcopal See of Minervino Murge

== Ordinaries ==
- Sante (1433–1434 Resigned)

...

- Roberto de Noya (Noja), O.P. (1492–1497 Appointed, Bishop of Acerra)
- Marino Falconi (1497–1525 Died)
- Antonio Sassolino, O.F.M. Conv. (1525–1528 Died)
- Bernardino Fumarelli (1528–1529 Appointed, Bishop of Alife)
- Giovanni Francesco de Marellis (1529–1536 Died)
- Donato Martuccio (Maricucci) (1536–1545 Appointed, Bishop of Lavello)
- Gian Vincenzo Micheli (1545–1596 Died)
- Lorenzo Monzonís Galatina, O.F.M. (1596–1605 Resigned)
- Giacomo Antonio Caporali (1606–1616 Died)
- Altobello Carissimi (1617–1632 Died)
- Giovanni Michele Rossi, O.C.D. (1633–1633 Appointed, Bishop of Alife)
- Gerolamo Maria Zambeccari, O.P. (1633–1635 Resigned)
- Antonio Maria Pranzoni (Franzoni) (1635–1663 Died)
- Francesco Maria Vignola (1663–1700 Died)
- Marcantonio Chenevix (1702–1718 Died)
- Nicola Pignatelli (1719–1734 Died)
- Fabio Troyli (1734–1751 Appointed, Bishop of Catanzaro)
- Stefano Gennaro Spani (1751–1776 Died)
- Pietro Silvio di Gennaro (1776–1779 Appointed, Bishop of Venosa)
- Pietro Mancini (1792–1808 Died)

== See also ==
- Catholic Church in Italy
