= Pietro Palagario =

Italian Roman Catholic prelate

Most Reverend Pietro Palagario
- Church: Catholic Church
- Diocese: Diocese of Telese
- In office: 1487–1505
- Predecessor: Troilo Agnesi
- Successor: Andrea Riccio (bishop)

Personal details
- Died: 1505

Pietro Palagario, O.F.M. (died 1505) was a Roman Catholic prelate who served as Bishop of Telese (1487–1505) and Bishop of Lavello (1482–1487).

== Biography ==
Pietro Palagario was ordained a priest in the Order of Friars Minor. On 21 June 1482, he was appointed during the papacy of Pope Sixtus IV as Bishop of Lavello. On 12 February 1487, he was appointed during the papacy of Pope Innocent VIII as Bishop of Telese. He served as Bishop of Telese o Cerreto Sannita until his death in 1505.

== External links and additional sources ==
- Cheney, David M. "Diocese of Lavello". Catholic-Hierarchy.org. (Chronology of Bishops) ^{[self-published]}
- Chow, Gabriel. "Titular Episcopal See of Lavello". GCatholic.org. (Chronology of Bishops) ^{[self-published]}
- Cheney, David M. "Diocese of Cerreto Sannita-Telese-Sant'Agata de' Goti". Catholic-Hierarchy.org. (Chronology of Bishops) ^{[self-published]}
- Chow, Gabriel. "Diocese of Cerreto Sannita-Telese-Sant'Agata de' Goti". GCatholic.org. (Chronology of Bishops) ^{[self-published]}

Catholic Church titles
Preceded by Stefano Capani	Bishop of Lavello; 1482–1487	Succeeded by Troilo Agnesi
Preceded by Troilo Agnesi	Bishop of Telese; 1487–1505	Succeeded by Andrea Riccio (bishop)
