= Lucio Maranta =

Italian Roman Catholic prelate

Most Reverend Lucio Maranta
- Bishop of Montepeloso
- Church: Catholic Church
- Diocese: Diocese of Montepeloso
- In office: 1578–1592
- Predecessor: Vincenzo Ferrari
- Successor: Gioia Dragomani
- Previous post: Bishop of Lavello (1561–1578)

Personal details
- Died: 1592 Montepeloso, Italy

Lucio Maranta or Bishop Luca Maranta (died 1592) was a Roman Catholic prelate who served as Bishop of Montepeloso (1578–1592) and Bishop of Lavello (1561–1578).

== Biography ==
On 31 January 1561, Lucio Maranta was appointed during the papacy of Pope Pius IV as Bishop of Lavello. On 2 June 1578, he was appointed during the papacy of Pope Gregory XIII as Bishop of Montepeloso. He served as Bishop of Montepeloso until his death in 1592.

== External links and additional sources ==
- Cheney, David M. "Diocese of Lavello". Catholic-Hierarchy.org. (Chronology of Bishops) ^{[self-published]}
- Chow, Gabriel. "Titular Episcopal See of Lavello". GCatholic.org. (Chronology of Bishops) ^{[self-published]}
- Cheney, David M. "Diocese of Montepeloso". Catholic-Hierarchy.org. (Chronology of Bishops) ^{[self-published]}
- Chow, Gabriel. "Diocese of Irsina (Italy)". GCatholic.org. (Chronology of Bishops) ^{[self-published]}

Catholic Church titles
Preceded by Antonio Fioribello	Bishop of Lavello; 1561–1578	Succeeded by Tiberio Cortesi
Preceded by Vincenzo Ferrari	Bishop of Montepeloso; 1578–1592	Succeeded by Gioia Dragomani
