= Francesco de' Notari =

Italian Roman Catholic prelate

Most Reverend Francesco de' Notari
- Bishop of Lavello
- Church: Catholic Church
- Diocese: Diocese of Lavello
- In office: 1644–1652
- Predecessor: Cherubino Manzoni
- Successor: Giuseppe Boncore

Orders
- Consecration: 17 July 1644 by Ciriaco Rocci

Personal details
- Died: 1652 Lavello, Italy

Francesco de' Notari, O.M. (died 1652) was a Roman Catholic prelate who served as Bishop of Lavello (1644–1652).

== Biography ==
Francesco de' Notari was born in Naples, Italy, and ordained a priest in the Order of Minims. On 13 July 1644, he was appointed during the papacy of Pope Urban VIII as Bishop of Lavello. On 17 July 1644, he was consecrated bishop by Ciriaco Rocci, Cardinal-Priest of San Salvatore in Lauro, with Alfonso Sacrati, Bishop Emeritus of Comacchio, and Francesco Maria Spinola, Bishop of Savona, serving as co-consecrators. He served as Bishop of Lavello until his death in 1652.

While bishop, he was the principal co-consecrator of Jacobus Wemmers, Titular Bishop of Memphis (1645).

== External links and additional sources ==
- Cheney, David M. "Diocese of Lavello". Catholic-Hierarchy.org. (Chronology of Bishops) ^{[self-published]}
- Chow, Gabriel. "Titular Episcopal See of Lavello". GCatholic.org. (Chronology of Bishops) ^{[self-published]}

Catholic Church titles
Preceded by Cherubino Manzoni	Bishop of Lavello; 1644–1652	Succeeded by Giuseppe Boncore
