= Nicolas Antonio (bishop) =

Roman Catholic prelate

Most Reverend Nicolas Antonio
- Bishop of Salpi
- Church: Catholic Church
- In office: 1422–?
- Previous post: Bishop of Lucera (1394–1422)

Nicolas Antonio, O.P. was a Roman Catholic prelate who served as Bishop of Salpi (1422–?) and Bishop of Lucera (1394–1422).

== Biography ==
Nicolas Antonio was ordained a priest in the Order of Preachers. On 4 Jul 1394, he was appointed during the papacy of Pope Boniface IX as Bishop of Lucera. On 22 Apr 1422, he was appointed during the papacy of Pope Martin V as Bishop of Salpi. It is uncertain how long he served as Bishop of Salpi. While bishop, he was the principal co-consecrator of Antonio Ventura, Bishop of Croatia (1425); and Filippo Ventorelli, Bishop of Amelia (1426).

== External links and additional sources ==
- Cheney, David M. "Diocese of Salpi (Salapia)". Catholic-Hierarchy.org. (for Chronology of Bishops)^{self-published}
- Chow, Gabriel. "Titular Episcopal See of Salpi (Italy)". GCatholic.org. (for Chronology of Bishops)^{self-published}
- Cheney, David M. "Diocese of Lucera-Troia". Catholic-Hierarchy.org. (for Chronology of Bishops) ^{[self-published]}
- Chow, Gabriel. "Diocese of Lucera-Troi (Italy)". GCatholic.org. (for Chronology of Bishops) ^{[self-published]}

Catholic Church titles
| Preceded by | Bishop of Lucera; 1394–1422 | Succeeded by |
| Preceded by | Bishop of Salpi; 1422–? | Succeeded by |
