= Giovanni de Manna =

Italian Roman Catholic prelate

Most Reverend Giovanni de Manna
- Bishop of Lavello
- Church: Catholic Church
- Diocese: Diocese of Lavello
- In office: 1502–1504
- Predecessor: Quirino Longo
- Successor: Bernardino Scannafora

Personal details
- Died: 1504 Lavello, Italy

Giovanni de Manna (died 1504) was a Roman Catholic prelate who served as Bishop of Lavello (1502–1504).

== Biography ==
On 24 August 1502, Giovanni de Manna was appointed by Pope Alexander VI as Bishop of Lavello. He served as Bishop of Lavello until his death in 1504.

== External links and additional sources ==
- Cheney, David M. "Diocese of Lavello". Catholic-Hierarchy.org. (Chronology of Bishops) ^{[self-published]}
- Chow, Gabriel. "Titular Episcopal See of Lavello". GCatholic.org. (Chronology of Bishops) ^{[self-published]}

Catholic Church titles
Preceded by Quirino Longo	Bishop of Lavello; 1502–1504	Succeeded by Bernardino Scannafora
