= Donato Martuccio =

Italian Roman Catholic prelate

Most Reverend Donato Martuccio
- Bishop of Sarno
- Church: Catholic Church
- Diocese: Diocese of Sarno
- In office: 1547–1548
- Predecessor: Mario Ruffino
- Successor: Guglielmo Tuttavilla
- Previous posts: Bishop of Minervino Murge (1536–1545); Bishop of Lavello (1545–1547)

Donato Martuccio and Donato Maricucci was a Roman Catholic prelate who served as Bishop of Sarno (1547–1548), Bishop of Lavello (1545–1547), and Bishop of Minervino Murge (1536–1545).

== Biography ==
On 11 February 1536, Donato Martuccio was appointed during the papacy of Pope Paul III as Bishop of Minervino Murge. On 2 March 1545, he was appointed during the papacy of Pope Paul III as Bishop of Lavello. On 16 March 1547, he was appointed during the papacy of Pope Paul III as Bishop of Sarno. He served as Bishop of Sarno until his resignation in 1548.

== External links and additional sources ==
- Cheney, David M. "Diocese of Minervino Murge". Catholic-Hierarchy.org. (for Chronology of Bishops) ^{[self-published]}
- Chow, Gabriel. "Titular Episcopal See of Minervino Murge (Italy)". GCatholic.org. (for Chronology of Bishops) ^{[self-published]}
- Cheney, David M. "Diocese of Lavello". Catholic-Hierarchy.org. (Chronology of Bishops) ^{[self-published]}
- Chow, Gabriel. "Titular Episcopal See of Lavello". GCatholic.org. (Chronology of Bishops) ^{[self-published]}
- Cheney, David M. "Diocese of Sarno". Catholic-Hierarchy.org. (for Chronology of Bishops) ^{[self-published]}
- Chow, Gabriel. "Diocese of Sarno (Italy)". GCatholic.org. (for Chronology of Bishops) ^{[self-published]}

Catholic Church titles
Preceded by Giovanni Francesco de Marellis	Bishop of Minervino Murge; 1547–1548	Succeeded by Gian Vincenzo Micheli
Preceded by Gian Vincenzo Micheli	Bishop of Lavello; 1545–1547	Succeeded by Domenico Stella
Preceded by Mario Ruffino	Bishop of Sarno; 1547–1548	Succeeded by Guglielmo Tuttavilla

\
