= Troilo Agnesi =

Italian Catholic bishop (f. 1482–1498)

Most Reverend Troilo Agnesi
- Bishop of Guardialfiera
- Church: Catholic Church
- Diocese: Diocese of Guardialfiera
- In office: 1498–?
- Successor: Marco Antonio Vascheri?
- Previous posts: Bishop of Penne e Atri (1482–1483); Bishop of Telese o Cerreto Sannita (1483–1487); Bishop of Lavello (1487–1498)

Troilo Agnesi was a Roman Catholic prelate who served as Bishop of Guardialfiera (1498–?), Bishop of Lavello (1487–1498), Bishop of Telese o Cerreto Sannita (1483–1487), and Bishop of Penne e Atri (1482–1483).

== Biography ==
On 30 October 1482, Troilo Agnesi was appointed Bishop of Penne e Atri by Pope Sixtus IV. On 17 December 1483, he was appointed by Pope Sixtus IV as Bishop of Telese o Cerreto Sannita. On 12 February 1487, he was appointed by Pope Innocent VIII as Bishop of Lavello. On 4 July 1498, he was appointed by Pope Alexander VI as Bishop of Guardialfiera.

It is uncertain how long he served as Bishop of Guardialfiera; the next record of a bishop is Marco Antonio Vascheri, who was appointed in 1510.

== See also ==
- Catholic Church in Italy

== External links and additional sources ==
- Cheney, David M. "Archdiocese of Pescara-Penne". Catholic-Hierarchy.org. (for Chronology of Bishops) ^{[self-published]}
- Chow, Gabriel. "Metropolitan Archdiocese of Pescara-Penne (Italy)". GCatholic.org. (for Chronology of Bishops) ^{[self-published]}
- Cheney, David M. "Diocese of Cerreto Sannita-Telese-Sant'Agata de' Goti". Catholic-Hierarchy.org. (Chronology of Bishops) ^{[self-published]}
- Chow, Gabriel. "Diocese of Cerreto Sannita-Telese-Sant'Agata de' Goti". GCatholic.org. (Chronology of Bishops) ^{[self-published]}
- Cheney, David M. "Diocese of Lavello". Catholic-Hierarchy.org. (Chronology of Bishops) ^{[self-published]}
- Chow, Gabriel. "Titular Episcopal See of Lavello". GCatholic.org. (Chronology of Bishops) ^{[self-published]}
- Cheney, David M. "Diocese of Guardialfiera (Guardia)". Catholic-Hierarchy.org. (for Chronology of Bishops) ^{[self-published]}
- Chow, Gabriel. "Titular Episcopal See of Guardialfiera (Italy)". GCatholic.org. (for Chronology of Bishops) ^{[self-published]}

Catholic Church titles
| Preceded by | Bishop of Penne e Atri; 1482–1483 | Succeeded by Matteo Giudici |
| Preceded by Matteo Giudici | Bishop of Telese o Cerreto Sannita; 1483–1487 | Succeeded by Pietro Palagario |
| Preceded by Pietro Palagario | Bishop of Lavello; 1487–1498 | Succeeded by Quirino Longo |
| Preceded by | Bishop of Guardialfiera; 1498–? | Succeeded by Marco Antonio Vascheri? |
