= Leone Fedeli =

Italian Roman Catholic prelate

Most Reverend Leone Fedeli
- Bishop of Lavello
- Church: Catholic Church
- Diocese: Diocese of Lavello
- In office: 1605–1613
- Predecessor: Diego della Quadra
- Successor: Selvaggio Primitelli

Orders
- Consecration: by Pietro Aldobrandini

Personal details
- Born: 1561 Vimercate, Italy
- Died: January 1613 (age 52) Lavello, Italy

Leone Fedeli (died January 1613) was a Roman Catholic prelate who served as Bishop of Lavello (1605–1613).

== Biography ==
Fedeli was born in Vimercate, Italy in 1561 and ordained a priest in the Order of Saint Benedict. On 7 January 1605, he was appointed by Pope Clement VIII as Bishop of Lavello. On 16 January 1605, he was consecrated bishop by Pietro Aldobrandini, Archbishop of Ravenna, with Fabio Blondus de Montealto, Titular Patriarch of Jerusalem, and Tommaso Lapis, Bishop of Fano, serving as co-consecrators. He served as Bishop of Lavello until his death in January 1613.

== External links and additional sources ==
- Cheney, David M. "Diocese of Lavello". Catholic-Hierarchy.org. (Chronology of Bishops) ^{[self-published]}
- Chow, Gabriel. "Titular Episcopal See of Lavello". GCatholic.org. (Chronology of Bishops) ^{[self-published]}

Catholic Church titles
| Preceded by Diego della Quadra | Bishop of Lavello; 1605–1613 | Succeeded by Selvaggio Primitelli |
