= Quirino Longo =

Italian Roman Catholic prelate

Most Reverend Quirino Longo
- Bishop of Lavello
- Church: Catholic Church
- Diocese: Diocese of Lavello
- In office: 1498–1502
- Predecessor: Troilo Agnesi
- Successor: Giovanni de Manna

Personal details
- Died: 1502 Lavello, Italy

Quirino Longo (died 1502) was a Roman Catholic prelate who served as Bishop of Lavello (1498–1502).

== Biography ==
In July 1498, Quirino Longo was appointed by Pope Alexander VI as Bishop of Lavello. He served as Bishop of Lavello until his death in 1502.

== See also ==
- Catholic Church in Italy

== External links and additional sources ==
- Cheney, David M. "Diocese of Lavello". Catholic-Hierarchy.org. (Chronology of Bishops) ^{[self-published]}
- Chow, Gabriel. "Titular Episcopal See of Lavello". GCatholic.org. (Chronology of Bishops) ^{[self-published]}

Catholic Church titles
Preceded by Troilo Agnesi	Bishop of Lavello; 1498–1502	Succeeded by Giovanni de Manna
