= Francesco Cereo de Mayda =

Italian Roman Catholic prelate

Most Reverend Francesco Cereo de Mayda
- Bishop of Lavello
- Church: Catholic Church
- Diocese: Diocese of Lavello
- In office: 1621-1626
- Predecessor: Giambattista Dal Mare
- Successor: Fabio Olivadisi

Personal details
- Born: 1568 Maida, Italy
- Died: 23 August 1626 (aged 57–58) Lavello, Italy

Francesco Cereo de Mayda (1568 – 23 August 1626) was a Roman Catholic prelate who served as Bishop of Lavello (1621–1626).

== Biography ==
Francesco Cereo de Mayda was born in Maida, Italy and ordained a friar in the Order of Minims. On 29 March 1621, he was appointed by Pope Gregory XV as Bishop of Lavello. He served as Bishop of Lavello until his death on 23 August 1626.

== External links and additional sources ==
- Cheney, David M. "Diocese of Lavello". Catholic-Hierarchy.org. (Chronology of Bishops) ^{[self-published]}
- Chow, Gabriel. "Titular Episcopal See of Lavello". GCatholic.org. (Chronology of Bishops) ^{[self-published]}

Catholic Church titles
Preceded by Giambattista Dal Mare	Bishop of Lavello; 1621–1626	Succeeded by Fabio Olivadisi
