= Mario Hispanus =

Italian Roman Catholic prelate

Most Reverend Mario Hispanus
- Bishop of Salpi
- Church: Catholic Church
- Diocese: Diocese of Salpi
- In office: 1523–1532
- Successor: Gaspar Flores

Orders
- Consecration: 22 February 1524 by Vincenzo de Andreis

Personal details
- Died: 1532

Mario Hispanus (died 1532) was a Roman Catholic prelate who served as Bishop of Salpi (1523–1532).

== Biography ==
On 16 March 1523, Mario Hispanus was appointed during the papacy of Pope Adrian VI as Bishop of Salpi. On 22 February 1524, he was consecrated bishop by Vincenzo de Andreis, Bishop Emeritus of Otočac, with Lorenzo Boschetti, Archbishop of Bar, and Leonardo Buccuto, Titular Archbishop of Nazareth, serving as co-consecrators. He served as Bishop of Salpi until his death in 1532.

== External links and additional sources ==
- Cheney, David M. "Diocese of Salpi (Salapia)". Catholic-Hierarchy.org. (for Chronology of Bishops)^{self-published}
- Chow, Gabriel. "Titular Episcopal See of Salpi (Italy)". GCatholic.org. (for Chronology of Bishops)^{self-published}

Catholic Church titles
Preceded by	Bishop of Salpi; 1523–1532	Succeeded by Gaspar Flores
