= Marco Antonio Vascheri =

Roman Catholic bishop

Most Reverend Marco Antonio Vascheri
- Bishop of Guardialfiera
- Church: Catholic Church
- In office: 1510–?
- Predecessor: Troilo Agnesi
- Successor: Zacharias Ferrari

Marco Antonio Vascheri was a Roman Catholic prelate who served as Bishop of Guardialfiera (1510–?).

== Biography ==
In 1510, Marco Antonio Vascheri was appointed during the papacy of Pope Julius II as Bishop of Guardialfiera. It is uncertain how long he served; the next bishop of record is Zacharias Ferrari who was appointed in 1519.

== External links and additional sources ==
- Cheney, David M. "Diocese of Guardialfiera (Guardia)". Catholic-Hierarchy.org. (for Chronology of Bishops) ^{[self-published]}
- Chow, Gabriel. "Titular Episcopal See of Guardialfiera (Italy)". GCatholic.org. (for Chronology of Bishops) ^{[self-published]}

Catholic Church titles
Preceded by Troilo Agnesi	Bishop of Guardialfiera; 1510–?	Succeeded by Zacharias Ferrari
