= Antonio Fioribello =

Roman Catholic prelate (died 1574)

Most Reverend Antonio Fioribello
- Bishop of Lavello
- Church: Catholic Church
- Diocese: Diocese of Lavello
- In office: 1558–1561
- Predecessor: Bartolomeo Orsucci
- Successor: Lucio Maranta

Personal details
- Died: 1574 Lavello, Italy

Antonio Fioribello (died 1574) was a Roman Catholic prelate who served as Bishop of Lavello (1558–1561).

== Biography ==
On 24 August 1558, Antonio Fioribello was appointed by Pope Paul IV as Bishop of Lavello. He served as Bishop of Lavello until his resignation in 1561. He died in 1574. While bishop, he was the principal co-consecrator of Paolo Oberti, Bishop of Venosa.

== External links and additional sources ==
- Cheney, David M. "Diocese of Lavello". Catholic-Hierarchy.org. (Chronology of Bishops) ^{[self-published]}
- Chow, Gabriel. "Titular Episcopal See of Lavello". GCatholic.org. (Chronology of Bishops) ^{[self-published]}

Catholic Church titles
| Preceded by Bartolomeo Orsucci | Bishop of Lavello; 1558–1561 | Succeeded by Lucio Maranta |
