= Vincenzo Periti =

Italian Roman Catholic prelate

Most Reverend Vincenzo Periti
- Bishop of Lavello
- Church: Catholic Church
- Diocese: Diocese of Lavello
- In office: 1615–1618
- Predecessor: Selvaggio Primitelli
- Successor: Giambattista Dal Mare

Orders
- Consecration: 28 May 1615 by Giovanni Garzia Mellini

Personal details
- Born: 1564 San Felice, Italy
- Died: 19 August 1618 (age 54) Lavello, Italy

Vincenzo Periti (1564 – 19 August 1618) was a Roman Catholic prelate who served as Bishop of Lavello (1615–1618).

== Biography ==
Vincenzo Periti was born in San Felice, Italy in 1564. On 18 May 1615, he was appointed during the papacy of Pope Paul V as Bishop of Lavello. On 28 May 1615, he was consecrated bishop by Giovanni Garzia Mellini, Cardinal-Priest of Santi Quattro Coronati with Ascanio Gesualdo, Archbishop of Bari-Canosa, and Giovanni Battista del Tufo, Bishop Emeritus of Acerra, serving as co-consecrators. He served as Bishop of Lavello until his death on 19 August 1618.

== External links and additional sources ==
- Cheney, David M. "Diocese of Lavello". Catholic-Hierarchy.org. (Chronology of Bishops) ^{[self-published]}
- Chow, Gabriel. "Titular Episcopal See of Lavello". GCatholic.org. (Chronology of Bishops) ^{[self-published]}

Catholic Church titles
Preceded by Selvaggio Primitelli	Bishop of Lavello; 1615–1618	Succeeded by Giambattista Dal Mare
