= Ludovico de Lagoria =

Italian Roman Catholic prelate

Most Reverend Ludovico de Lagoria
- Bishop of Lavello
- Church: Catholic Church
- Diocese: Diocese of Lavello
- In office: 1504–1515
- Predecessor: Bernardino de Leis
- Successor: Pietro Prisco Guglielmucci
- Previous post: Bishop of Cagli (1503–1504)

Ludovico de Lagoria, O.P. was a Roman Catholic prelate who served as Bishop of Lavello (1504–1515) and Bishop of Cagli (1503–1504).

== Biography ==
Ludovico de Lagoria was ordained a priest in the Order of Preachers. On 8 March 1503, he was appointed Bishop of Cagli by Pope Alexander VI. He was appointed by Pope Julius II Bishop of Lavello on 13 February 1504. He served as Bishop of Lavello until his resignation on 8 August 1515.

== External links and additional sources ==
- Cheney, David M. "Diocese of Cagli e Pergola". Catholic-Hierarchy.org. (Chronology of Bishops) ^{[self-published]}
- Chow, Gabriel. "Diocese of Cagli". GCatholic.org. (Chronology of Bishops) ^{[self-published]}
- Cheney, David M. "Diocese of Lavello". Catholic-Hierarchy.org. (Chronology of Bishops) ^{[self-published]}
- Chow, Gabriel. "Titular Episcopal See of Lavello". GCatholic.org. (Chronology of Bishops) ^{[self-published]}

Catholic Church titles
Preceded by Gaspare Golfi	Bishop of Cagli; 1503–1504	Succeeded by Bernardino de Leis
Preceded by Bernardino de Leis	Bishop of Lavello; 1504–1515	Succeeded by Pietro Prisco Guglielmucci
