= Roman Catholic Diocese of Lavello =

Roman Catholic Diocese

The Diocese of Levello (Latin Dioecesis Lavellensis) was a Roman Catholic diocese in southern Italy, located in the city of Lavello, province of Potenza, in the region of Basilicata. In 1818, it was suppressed, and its territory and members incorporated in the Diocese of Venosa.

== History ==
- 984: Established as Diocese of Levello (Dioecesis Lavellensis)
- 1818 June 27: Suppressed to the Diocese of Venosa
- 1968: Restored as Titular Episcopal See of Lavello

== Bishops of the Diocese of Lavello ==
- Stefano Capani (13 Jun 1463 – 1481 Died)
- Pietro Palagario, O.F.M. (21 Jun 1482 – 12 Feb 1487 Appointed, Bishop of Telese o Cerreto Sannita)
- Troilo Agnesi (12 Feb 1487 – 4 Jul 1498 Appointed, Bishop of Guardialfiera)
- Quirino Longo (4 Jul 1498 – 1502 Died)
- Giovanni de Manna (24 Aug 1502 – 1504 Died)
- Bernardino Scannafora (Jan 1504 – 19 Jan 1504 Appointed, Bishop of Castro di Puglia)
- Bernardino de Leis, C.R.L. (19 Jan 1504 – 23 Feb 1504 Appointed, Bishop of Cagli)
- Ludovico de Lagoria, O.P. (13 Feb 1504 – 8 Aug 1515 Resigned)
- Pietro Prisco Guglielmucci (10 Dec 1515 – Jun 1539 Died)
- Gian Vincenzo Micheli (30 May 1539 – 2 Mar 1545 Appointed, Bishop of Minervino Murge)
- Donato Martuccio (Maricucci) (2 Mar 1545 – 16 Mar 1547 Appointed, Bishop of Sarno)
- Tommaso Stella, O.P. (22 Apr 1547 – 10 Nov 1549 Appointed, Bishop of Capodistria)
- Gian Pietro Ferretti (5 Mar 1550 – 1554 Resigned)
- Bartolomeo Orsucci (13 Apr 1554 – 1558 Died)
- Antonio Fioribello (24 Aug 1558 – 1561 Resigned)
- Lucio Maranta (31 Jan 1561 – 2 Jun 1578 Appointed, Bishop of Montepeloso)
- Tiberio Cortesi (9 Jul 1578 – 1602 Died)
- Diego della Quadra (26 Jun 1602 – 1604 Died)
- Leone Fedeli, O.S.B. (7 Jan 1605 – Jan 1613 Died)
- Selvaggio Primitelli (11 Feb 1613 – 1615 Died)
- Vincenzo Periti (18 May 1615 – 19 Aug 1618 Died)
- Giambattista Dal Mare, O.P. (22 Oct 1618 – 23 Sep 1620 Died)
- Francesco Cereo de Mayda, O.M. (29 Mar 1621 – 23 Aug 1626 Died)
- Fabio Olivadisi (16 Nov 1626 – 20 Sep 1627 Appointed, Bishop of Bova)
- Placido Padiglia, O.S.B. (20 Sep 1627 – 27 Nov 1634 Appointed, Bishop of Alessano)
- Cherubino Manzoni, O.F.M. (9 Jul 1635 – 13 Jul 1644 Appointed, Bishop of Termoli)
- Francesco de' Notari, O.M. (13 Jul 1644 – 1652 Died)
- Giuseppe Boncore (13 May 1652 – 23 Jun 1687 Died)
- Bartolomeo Rosa (17 May 1688 – 21 Aug 1688 Died)
- Sebastiano Milazzi (Milati), O.S.B. (20 Dec 1688 – 30 Aug 1699 Died)
- Nicolò Cervini (28 May 1700 – 24 Oct 1728 Died)
- Francesco Silvestri (15 Dec 1728 – 27 Dec 1744 Died)
- Honuphrius Belsito (10 May 1745 – 23 Nov 1752 Resigned)
- Gerardo Giannettasio (27 Nov 1752 – 31 Mar 1765 Died)
- Franciscus Xaverius Romanelli (5 Aug 1765 – 18 Sep 1775 Died)
- Domenico Arcaroli (29 Jan 1776 – 26 Mar 1792 Confirmed, Bishop of Vieste)
- Gennaro Fortunato (26 Mar 1792 – 26 Dec 1799 Died)

== See also ==
- Catholic Church in Italy
