= Tiberio Cortesi =

Roman Catholic Bishop

Most Reverend Tiberio Cortesi
- Bishop of Lavello
- Church: Catholic Church
- Diocese: Diocese of Lavello
- In office: 1578–1602
- Predecessor: Lucio Maranta
- Successor: Diego della Quadra

Personal details
- Died: 1602 Lavello, Italy

Tiberio Cortesi (died 1602) was a Roman Catholic prelate who served as Bishop of Lavello (1578–1602).

== Biography ==
On 9 July 1578, Tiberio Cortesi was appointed by Pope Gregory XIII as Bishop of Lavello. He served as Bishop of Lavello until his death in 1602.

== See also ==
- Catholic Church in Italy

== External links and additional sources ==
- Cheney, David M. "Diocese of Lavello". Catholic-Hierarchy.org. (Chronology of Bishops) ^{[self-published]}
- Chow, Gabriel. "Titular Episcopal See of Lavello". GCatholic.org. (Chronology of Bishops) ^{[self-published]}

Catholic Church titles
| Preceded by Lucio Maranta | Bishop of Lavello; 1578–1602 | Succeeded by Diego della Quadra |
