= Timocrate Aloigi =

Most Reverend Timocrate Aloigi
- Bishop of Cagli
- Church: Catholic Church
- In office: 1607–1610
- Predecessor: Ascanio Libertano
- Successor: Filippo Bigli

Orders
- Consecration: 20 May 1607 by Marcello Lante della Rovere

Personal details
- Born: 1543 Apecchio, Papal States
- Died: 17 February 1610 (age 67) Cagli, Papal States

Timocrate Aloigi or Democrate Aloisi (1543–1610) was a Roman Catholic prelate who served as Bishop of Cagli (1607–1610).

== Biography ==
Timocrate Aloigi was born in Apecchio, Italy in 1543. On 14 May 1607, he was appointed during the papacy of Pope Paul V as Bishop of Cagli. On 20 May 1607, he was consecrated bishop by Marcello Lante della Rovere, Bishop of Todi, with Giovanni Battista del Tufo, Bishop Emeritus of Acerra, and Giovanni Vitelli, Bishop of Carinola, serving as co-consecrators. He served as Bishop of Cagli until his death on 17 February 1610.

== External links and additional sources ==
- Cheney, David M. "Diocese of Cagli e Pergola". Catholic-Hierarchy.org.^{self-published}
- Chow, Gabriel. "Diocese of Cagli". GCatholic.org.^{self-published}

Catholic Church titles
Preceded by Ascanio Libertano	Bishop of Cagli; 1607–1610	Succeeded by Filippo Bigli
