= Pietro Prisco Guglielmucci =

Most Reverend Pietro Prisco Guglielmucci
- Bishop of Lavello
- Church: Catholic Church
- Diocese: Diocese of Lavello
- In office: 1515–1539
- Predecessor: Ludovico de Lagoria
- Successor: Gian Vincenzo Micheli

Personal details
- Died: 1539 Lavello, Italy

Pietro Prisco Guglielmucci (died 1539) was a Roman Catholic prelate who served as Bishop of Lavello (1515–1539).

== Biography ==
On 10 December 1515, Pietro Prisco Guglielmucci was appointed by Pope Leo X as Bishop of Lavello. He served as Bishop of Lavello until his death in June 1539.

While bishop, he was the principal consecrator of Andrés Clemente de Torrecremata, Bishop of Duvno.

== External links and additional sources ==
- Cheney, David M. "Diocese of Lavello". Catholic-Hierarchy.org. (Chronology of Bishops) ^{[self-published]}
- Chow, Gabriel. "Titular Episcopal See of Lavello". GCatholic.org. (Chronology of Bishops) ^{[self-published]}

Catholic Church titles
Preceded by Ludovico de Lagoria	Bishop of Lavello; 1515–1539	Succeeded by Gian Vincenzo Micheli
