= Bartolomeo Rosa =

17th-century Roman Catholic bishop

Most Reverend Bartolomeo Rosa
- Bishop of Lavello
- Church: Catholic Church
- Diocese: Diocese of Lavello
- In office: 1688
- Predecessor: Giuseppe Boncore
- Successor: Sebastiano Milazzi

Orders
- Ordination: 24 March 1674
- Consecration: 23 May 1688 by Marcantonio Barbarigo

Personal details
- Born: 14 July 1648 Muro Lucano, Italy
- Died: 21 August 1688 (age 40) Lavello, Italy

Bartolomeo Rosa (1648–1688) was a Roman Catholic prelate who served as Bishop of Lavello (1688).

== Biography ==
Bartolomeo Rosa was born in Muro Lucano, Italy on 14 July 1648 and ordained a priest on 24 March 1674. On 17 May 1688, he was appointed during the papacy of Pope Innocent XI as Bishop of Lavello. On 23 May 1688, he was consecrated bishop by Marcantonio Barbarigo, Bishop of Corneto (Tarquinia) e Montefiascone, with Pietro de Torres, Archbishop of Dubrovnik, and Costanzo Zani, Bishop of Imola, serving as co-consecrators. He served as Bishop of Lavello until his death on 21 August 1688.

== External links and additional sources ==
- Cheney, David M. "Diocese of Lavello". Catholic-Hierarchy.org. (Chronology of Bishops) ^{[self-published]}
- Chow, Gabriel. "Titular Episcopal See of Lavello". GCatholic.org. (Chronology of Bishops) ^{[self-published]}

Catholic Church titles
Preceded by Giuseppe Boncore	Bishop of Lavello; 1688	Succeeded by Sebastiano Milazzi
