= Vincenzo Ercolano =

Italian Roman Catholic archbishop

The Most Reverend Vincenzo Ercolano
- Bishop of Perugia
- Church: Catholic Church
- Diocese: Diocese of Perugia
- In office: 1579–1586
- Predecessor: Francesco Bossi
- Successor: Antonio Maria Gallo
- Previous posts: Bishop of Sarno (1569–1573); Bishop of Imola (1573–1579)

Orders
- Consecration: 8 January 1570 by Scipione Rebiba

Personal details
- Born: 1517
- Died: 29 October 1586 (aged 68–69) Perugia, Italy

Vincenzo Ercolano (also Vincenzo Herculani) (1517 – 29 October 1586) was a Roman Catholic prelate who served as Bishop of Perugia (1579–1586), Bishop of Imola (1573–1579), and Bishop of Sarno (1569–1573).

== Biography ==
Vincenzo Ercolano was born in 1517 and ordained a priest in the Order of Preachers. On 14 December 1569, he was appointed during the papacy of Pope Pius V as Bishop of Sarno. On 8 January 1570, he was consecrated bishop by Scipione Rebiba, Cardinal-Priest of Sant'Angelo in Pescheria, with Galeazzo Gegald, Bishop Emeritus of Bagnoregio, and Umberto Locati, Bishop of Bagnoregio, serving as co-consecrators. On 9 February 1573, he was appointed during the papacy of Pope Gregory XIII as Bishop of Imola. On 27 November 1579, he was appointed during the papacy of Pope Gregory XIII as Bishop of Perugia. He served as Bishop of Perugia until his death on 29 October 1586. While bishop, he was the principal co-consecrator of Baldassarre Giustiniani, Bishop of Venosa.

== External links and additional sources ==
- Cheney, David M. "Diocese of Sarno". Catholic-Hierarchy.org. (for Chronology of Bishops) ^{[self-published]}
- Chow, Gabriel. "Diocese of Sarno (Italy)". GCatholic.org. (for Chronology of Bishops) ^{[self-published]}
- Cheney, David M. "Diocese of Imola". Catholic-Hierarchy.org. (for Chronology of Bishops) ^{[self-published]}
- Chow, Gabriel. "Diocese of Imola (Italy)". GCatholic.org. (for Chronology of Bishops) ^{[self-published]}
- Cheney, David M. "Archdiocese of Perugia-Città della Pieve". Catholic-Hierarchy.org. (for Chronology of Bishops) ^{[self-published]}
- Chow, Gabriel. "Metropolitan Archdiocese of Perugia-Città della Pieve (Italy)". GCatholic.org. (for Chronology of Bishops) ^{[self-published]}

Catholic Church titles
Preceded by Guglielmo Tuttavilla	Bishop of Sarno; 1569–1573	Succeeded by Vincenzo de Siena
Preceded by Giovanni Aldobrandini	Bishop of Imola; 1573–1579	Succeeded by Alessandro Musotti
Preceded by Francesco Bossi	Bishop of Perugia; 1579–1586	Succeeded by Antonio Maria Gallo
