= Vincenzo de Siena =

Most Reverend Vincenzo de Sena
- Bishop of Sarno
- Church: Catholic Church
- Diocese: Diocese of Sarno
- In office: 1573–1578
- Predecessor: Vincenzo Ercolano
- Successor: Paolo Fusco

Personal details
- Died: 10 January 1578 Sarno, Italy

Vincenzo de Sena, also known as Vincenzo da Ceprano, (died 10 January 1578) was a Roman Catholic prelate who served as Bishop of Sarno (1573–1578).

== Biography ==
Vincenzo de Sena was ordained a priest in the Order of Preachers. He was appointed Inquisitor in the diocese of Cremona. He then became Prior of the Dominican convent of San Sebastiano of Naples, and then (c. 1542) of Santa Caterina a Formello. He was an assistant of the Master of the Sacred Palaces under Pope Gregory XIII

On 19 February 1573, he was appointed Bishop of Sarno by Pope Gregory XIII. He built the episcopal palace in the Borgo of Sarno, and had a cistern constructed to serve the cathedral with water. In 1575, with papal approval, he granted the Conventual Franciscans the Church of S. Maria della Foce, which was part of the episcopal mensa (official income). It was suppressed in 1810 for lack of members. He served as Bishop of Sarno for nearly five years, until his death in Naples on 10 January 1578. He was buried in the Frate di Santa Caterina di Formello.

== See also ==
- Diocese of Sarno

== Sources ==
- Cavalieri, Giorgio Michele (1696). Galleria de'Sommi Pontefici, patriarchi, arcivescovi, e vescovi dell'ordine de'Predicatori. (in Italian). vol. 1 (Benevento: Stamperia arcivescovale 1696), pp. 455-456.
- Eubel, Conradus, ed. (1923). Hierarchia catholica (in Latin). Vol. 3 (Tomus 3) (second ed.). Münster: Libreria Regensbergiana. p. 293..
- Normandia, Giacinto (1851). Notizie storiche ed industriali della città di Sarno. (in Italian). Napoli: Vaglio 1851. pp. 93; pp. 177-178.
- Rivista storica italiana vol. 100 (1988), p. 120.
- Ughelli, Ferdinando; Coleti, NIccolo (1721). Italia sacra sive De episcopis Italiæ, et insularum adjacentium (in Latin). Vol. 7 (Tomus septimus). Venice: apud Sebastianum Coleti. pp. 580–581..

=== External links ===
- Cheney, David M. "Diocese of Sarno". Catholic-Hierarchy.org. (for Chronology of Bishops) ^{[self-published]}
- Chow, Gabriel. "Diocese of Sarno (Italy)". GCatholic.org. (for Chronology of Bishops) ^{[self-published]}

Catholic Church titles
Preceded by Vincenzo Ercolano	Bishop of Sarno; 1573–1578	Succeeded by Paolo Fusco
