= Gian Vincenzo Micheli =

Italian Roman Catholic prelate

Most Reverend Gian Vincenzo Micheli
- Bishop of Minervino Murge
- Church: Catholic Church
- Diocese: Diocese of Minervino Murge
- In office: 1545–1596
- Predecessor: Donato Martuccio
- Successor: Lorenzo Monzonís Galatina
- Previous post: Bishop of Lavello (1539–1545)

Personal details
- Died: 1596 Minervino Murge

Gian Vincenzo Micheli (died 1596) was a Roman Catholic prelate who served as Bishop of Minervino Murge (1545–1596) and Bishop of Lavello (1539–1545).

== Biography ==
On 30 May 1539, Gian Vincenzo Micheli was appointed during the papacy of Pope Paul III as Bishop of Lavello. On 2 March 1545, he was appointed during the papacy of Pope Paul III as Bishop of Minervino Murge. He served as Bishop of Minervino Murge until his death in 1596.

== External links and additional sources ==
- Cheney, David M. "Diocese of Lavello". Catholic-Hierarchy.org. (Chronology of Bishops) ^{[self-published]}
- Chow, Gabriel. "Titular Episcopal See of Lavello". GCatholic.org. (Chronology of Bishops) ^{[self-published]}
- Cheney, David M. "Diocese of Minervino Murge". Catholic-Hierarchy.org. (for Chronology of Bishops) ^{[self-published]}
- Chow, Gabriel. "Titular Episcopal See of Minervino Murge". GCatholic.org. (for Chronology of Bishops) ^{[self-published]}

Catholic Church titles
Preceded by Pietro Prisco Guglielmucci	Bishop of Lavello; 1539–1545	Succeeded by Donato Martuccio
Preceded by Donato Martuccio	Bishop of Minervino Murge; 1545–1596	Succeeded by Lorenzo Monzonís Galatina
