= Gaspar Flores =

Italian Roman Catholic prelate

Most Reverend Gaspar Flores
- Bishop of Salpi
- Church: Catholic Church
- Diocese: Diocese of Salpi
- In office: 1532–1544
- Predecessor: Mario Hispanus
- Successor: Domenico Stella
- Previous post: Auxiliary Bishop of Sigüenza (1533–1537)

Personal details
- Died: 1544 Salpi, Italy

Gaspar Flores (died 1544) was a Roman Catholic prelate who served as Bishop of Salpi (1532–1544) and Auxiliary Bishop of Sigüenza (1533–1537).

== Biography ==
On 13 November 1532, Gaspar Flores was appointed during the papacy of Pope Clement VII as Bishop of Salpi. In 1533, he was appointed during the papacy of Pope Clement VII as Auxiliary Bishop of Sigüenza. He served as Auxiliary Bishop of Sigüenza until his resignation in 1537. He served as Bishop of Salpi until his death in 1544.

== External links and additional sources ==
- Cheney, David M. "Diocese of Salpi (Salapia)". Catholic-Hierarchy.org. (for Chronology of Bishops) ^{[self-published]}
- Chow, Gabriel. "Titular Episcopal See of Salpi (Italy)". GCatholic.org. (for Chronology of Bishops) ^{[self-published]}

Catholic Church titles
Preceded by	Auxiliary Bishop of Sigüenza; 1533–1537	Succeeded by
Preceded by Mario Hispanus	Bishop of Salpi; 1532–1544	Succeeded by Domenico Stella
