= Gian Pietro Ferretti =

Roman Catholic prelate (died 1557)

Most Reverend Gian Pietro Ferretti
- Bishop Emeritus of Lavello
- Church: Catholic Church
- Diocese: Diocese of Lavello
- In office: 1550–1554
- Predecessor: Domenico Stella
- Successor: Bartolomeo Orsucci
- Previous post: Bishop of Milos (1541–1545)

Orders
- Consecration: 5 Febr 1545 (Bishop) by Girolamo Maccabei de Toscanella

Personal details
- Born: c. 1482 Ravenna
- Died: 6 May 1557 (aged 74–75) Ravenna
- Buried: San Giovanni Evangelista, Ravenna

Gian Pietro Ferretti (c. 1482 – 1557) was a Roman Catholic prelate who served as Bishop of Lavello (1550–1554) and Bishop of Milos (1541–1545). He is mainly known for his historical works.

== Early life and Works ==
Gian Pietro Ferretti was born in Ravenna around the year 1482, the son of a professor of rhetoric. From an early age, he pursued humanistic studies, and in 1510 he obtained a doctorate in utroque iure at the University of Siena, where he remained for several years, lecturing in canon law. Giovanni Pietro embarked upon an ecclesiastical career and settled in Ravenna, where he became a member of the collegiate church of Sant’Agnese. He traveled frequently to Rome, where he was appointed Protonotary Apostolic. His principal interest remained rooted in humanistic culture and historiographical inquiry. In 1530, he was named Vicar General to the Archbishop of Ravenna.

He was commissioned by Pope Clement VII to conduct historical research in support of a legal case before Emperor Charles V, aiming to demonstrate that the cities of Modena and Reggio Emilia were territories under papal jurisdiction rather than imperial authority, and thus ought to be removed from the Duchy of Ferrara. These investigations culminated in his principal historiographical work, De Ravennati Exarchatu, which was later further expanded. Although the work was never printed, several manuscript copies are preserved in the Vatican Library.

Other historical works of his survive in manuscript form, such as the Commentaria in Ecclesiasticas Disciplinae et Divinas Institutiones, concerning clerical discipline; the De Viris Illustribus Civitatis Ravennae, dedicated to the eminent men of the city of Ravenna; and the first book of the annals of that same city.

== Ecclesiastic Career ==
From 1535 to 1539, he served as Vicar of the Diocese of Adria, and on 4 February 1541, he was appointed Bishop of Milos, though he never took up residence there. On 5 February 1545 he was consecrated bishop in Rome by Girolamo Maccabei de Toscanella. That same year, he served as suffragan bishop in the Diocese of Brescia, where his chief concern was the discipline of the clergy. To that end, he oversaw the reprinting of the Constitutiones et edicta observanda in S. Brixiensi Ecclesia et eius tota diocesi. In December of 1545, he informed the Papal Nuncio in Venice that the Bishop of Capodistria (Koper), Pier Paolo Vergerio , held views regarded as heretical. He resigned as Bishop of Milos in 1545.

From 1545 to 1549, he participated in the Council of Trent, receiving a monthly stipend of 25 scudi as a poor prelate. During this period, he repeatedly petitioned for appointment to a diocese capable of sustaining him, and only on 5 March 1550 was he named Bishop of Lavello, a small town within the Kingdom of Naples. In 1554, he resigned the episcopate and retired to Ravenna, where he died on 6 May 1557. He was interred in the church of San Giovanni Evangelista.

Catholic Church titles
Preceded by Francesco Rocchi	Bishop of Milos; 1541–1545	Succeeded by Gregorio Castagnola
Preceded by Domenico Stella	Bishop of Lavello; 1550–1554	Succeeded by Bartolomeo Orsucci
