= Bartolomeo Orsucci =

Italian Roman Catholic prelate (died 1558)

Most Reverend Bartolomeo Orsucci
- Bishop of Lavello
- Church: Catholic Church
- Diocese: Diocese of Lavello
- In office: 1554–1558
- Predecessor: Gian Pietro Ferretti
- Successor: Antonio Fioribello

Personal details
- Died: 1558 Lavello, Italy

Bartolomeo Orsucci (died 1558) was a Roman Catholic prelate who served as Bishop of Lavello (1554–1558).

== Biography ==
On 13 April 1554, Bartolomeo Orsucci was appointed by Pope Julius III as Bishop of Lavello. He served as Bishop of Lavello until his death in 1558.

== External links and additional sources ==
- Cheney, David M. "Diocese of Lavello". Catholic-Hierarchy.org. (Chronology of Bishops) ^{[self-published]}
- Chow, Gabriel. "Titular Episcopal See of Lavello". GCatholic.org. (Chronology of Bishops) ^{[self-published]}

Catholic Church titles
Preceded by Gian Pietro Ferretti	Bishop of Lavello; 1554–1558	Succeeded by Antonio Fioribello
