= Bernardino de Leis =

Most Reverend Bernardino de Leis
- Bishop of Cagli
- Church: Catholic Church
- Diocese: Diocese of Ischia
- In office: 1504–1506
- Predecessor: Ludovico de Lagoria
- Successor: Antonio Castriani

Personal details
- Died: 6 January 1506 Cagli, Italy

Bernardino de Leis, C.R.L. (died 1506) was a Roman Catholic prelate who served as Bishop of Cagli (1504–1506), Bishop of Lavello (1504), Bishop of Castro di Puglia (1504), and Bishop of Ischia (1501–1504).

== Biography ==
Bernardino de Leis was ordained a priest in the Canons Regular of the Lateran. On 27 October 1501, he was appointed during the papacy of Pope Alexander VI as Bishop of Ischia.{ On 8 January 1504, he was appointed during the papacy of Pope Julius II as Bishop of Castro di Puglia. On 19 January 1504, he was appointed during the papacy of Pope Julius II as Bishop of Lavello. On 23 February 1504, he was appointed during the papacy of Pope Julius II as Bishop of Cagli. He served as Bishop of Cagli until his death on 6 January 1506.

== External links and additional sources ==
- Cheney, David M. "Diocese of Ischia". Catholic-Hierarchy.org. (Chronology of Bishops) ^{[self-published]}
- Chow, Gabriel. "Diocese of Ischia". GCatholic.org. (Chronology of Bishops) ^{[self-published]}
- Cheney, David M. "Diocese of Castro di Puglia". Catholic-Hierarchy.org. (Chronology of Bishops) ^{[self-published]}
- Chow, Gabriel. "Titular Episcopal See of Castro di Puglia (Italy)". GCatholic.org. (Chronology of Bishops) ^{[self-published]}
- Cheney, David M. "Diocese of Lavello". Catholic-Hierarchy.org. (Chronology of Bishops) ^{[self-published]}
- Chow, Gabriel. "Titular Episcopal See of Lavello". GCatholic.org. (Chronology of Bishops) ^{[self-published]}

Catholic Church titles
Preceded by	Bishop of Ischia; 1501–1504	Succeeded by Donato Strineo
Preceded by Donato Strineo	Bishop of Castro di Puglia; 1504	Succeeded by Bernardino Scannafora
Preceded by Bernardino Scannafora	Bishop of Lavello; 1504	Succeeded by Ludovico de Lagoria
Preceded by Ludovico de Lagoria	Bishop of Cagli; 1504–1506	Succeeded by Antonio Castriani
