= Alessandro Musotti =

Roman Catholic prelate

Most Reverend Alessandro Musotti
- Bishop of Imola
- Church: Catholic Church
- Diocese: Diocese of Imola
- In office: 1579–1607
- Predecessor: Vincenzo Ercolano
- Successor: Giovanni Garzia Mellini

Personal details
- Died: 23 January 1607

Alessandro Musotti (died 23 January 1607) was a Roman Catholic prelate who served as Bishop of Imola (1579–1607).

== Biography ==
On 9 December 1579, Alessandro Musotti was appointed during the papacy of Pope Gregory XIII as Bishop of Imola. He served as Bishop of Imola until his death on 23 January 1607. While bishop, he was the principal co-consecrator of Silvio Savelli (cardinal), Archbishop of Rossano (1582).

== External links and additional sources ==
- Cheney, David M. "Diocese of Imola". Catholic-Hierarchy.org. (for Chronology of Bishops) ^{[self-published]}
- Chow, Gabriel. "Diocese of Imola (Italy)". GCatholic.org. (for Chronology of Bishops) ^{[self-published]}

Catholic Church titles
Preceded by Vincenzo Ercolano	Bishop of Imola; 1579–1607	Succeeded by Giovanni Garzia Mellini
