= Guglielmo Tuttavilla =

Most Reverend Guglielmo Tuttavilla
- Bishop of Sarno
- Church: Catholic Church
- Diocese: Diocese of Sarno
- In office: 1548–1569
- Predecessor: Donato Martuccio
- Successor: Vincenzo Ercolano

Personal details
- Died: 1569 Sarno, Italy

Guglielmo Tuttavilla (died 1569) was a Roman Catholic prelate who served as Bishop of Sarno (1548–1569).

== Biography ==
On 27 April 1548, Guglielmo Tuttavilla was appointed during the papacy of Pope Paul III as Bishop of Sarno. He served as Bishop of Sarno until his death in 1569.

== External links and additional sources ==
- Cheney, David M. "Diocese of Sarno". Catholic-Hierarchy.org. (for Chronology of Bishops) ^{[self-published]}
- Chow, Gabriel. "Diocese of Sarno (Italy)". GCatholic.org. (for Chronology of Bishops) ^{[self-published]}

Catholic Church titles
Preceded by Donato Martuccio	Bishop of Sarno; 1548–1569	Succeeded by Vincenzo Ercolano
