= Giambattista Dal Mare =

Italian Roman Catholic prelate

Most Reverend Giambattista Dal Mare
- Bishop of Lavello
- Church: Catholic Church
- Diocese: Diocese of Lavello
- In office: 1618–1620
- Predecessor: Vincenzo Periti
- Successor: Francesco Cereo de Mayda

Orders
- Consecration: 4 November 1618 by Filippo Filonardi

Personal details
- Died: 23 September 1620 Lavello, Italy

Giambattista Dal Mare, O.P. (died 1620) was a Roman Catholic prelate who served as Bishop of Lavello (1618–1620).

== Biography ==
Giambattista Dal Mare was ordained a priest in the Order of Preachers. On 22 October 1618, he was appointed during the papacy of Pope Paul V as Bishop of Lavello. On 4 November 1618, he was consecrated bishop by Filippo Filonardi, Cardinal-Priest of Santa Maria del Popolo, with Diego Alvarez (archbishop), Archbishop of Trani, and Paolo De Curtis, Bishop Emeritus of Isernia, serving as co-consecrators. He served as Bishop of Lavello until his death on 23 September 1620.

== External links and additional sources ==
- Cheney, David M. "Diocese of Lavello". Catholic-Hierarchy.org. (Chronology of Bishops) ^{[self-published]}
- Chow, Gabriel. "Titular Episcopal See of Lavello". GCatholic.org. (Chronology of Bishops) ^{[self-published]}

Catholic Church titles
| Preceded by Vincenzo Periti | Bishop of Lavello; 1618–1620 | Succeeded by Francesco Cereo de Mayda |
