= Francesco Colonna (bishop) =

Roman Catholic Bishop of Castro di Puglia (1597–1653)

Most Reverend Francesco Colonna
- Church: Catholic Church
- In office: 1642–1653
- Predecessor: Dionisio Tomacelli
- Successor: Annibale Sillano

Personal details
- Born: 1597 Milazzo, Italy
- Died: 29 Jun 1653 (age 56) Castro di Puglia, Italy

Francesco Colonna (1597 – 29 Jun 1653) was a Roman Catholic prelate who served as Bishop of Castro di Puglia (1642–1653).

== Biography ==
Francesco Colonna was born in Milazzo, Italy in 1597. On 16 Jun 1642, he was appointed during the papacy of Pope Urban VIII as Bishop of Castro di Puglia. On 29 Jun 1642, he was consecrated bishop by Giulio Cesare Sacchetti, Cardinal-Priest of Santa Susanna. He served as Bishop of Castro di Puglia until his death on 29 Jun 1653.

== See also ==
- Catholic Church in Italy

== External links and additional sources ==
- Cheney, David M. "Diocese of Castro di Puglia". Catholic-Hierarchy.org. (Chronology of Bishops) ^{[self-published]}
- Chow, Gabriel. "Titular Episcopal See of Castro di Puglia (Italy)". GCatholic.org. (Chronology of Bishops) ^{[self-published]}

Catholic Church titles
Preceded by Dionisio Tomacelli	Bishop of Castro di Puglia; 1642–1653	Succeeded by Annibale Sillano
