= Antonio Castriani =

Italian bishop

Antonio Castriani (surname also given as Crastini) (c.1460 – August 11, 1510) was an Italian Roman Catholic bishop.

== Biography ==
Castriani was a native of Sassoferrato. He is said to have been the majordomo of Francesco Alidosi, who became a cardinal in 1505, and Preceptor of Prince Francesco Maria Feltrio della Rovere; he served in Senigallia as locumtens of Duke Giovanni della Rovere of Sora, the father of Francesco. Giovanni's brother, Pope Julius II, made Castriani a domestic prelate, and he was the pope's commensualis.

On March 17, 1506, Antonio Castriani was appointed Bishop of Cagli by Pope Julius II, but this term was short-lived. He was appointed Bishop of Montefeltro on May 21, 1507, a position he held until his death on August 11, 1510.

== Sources ==
- Cappelletti, Giuseppe (1845). Le chiese d'Italia (in Italian). Vol. terzo. Venice: G. Antonelli. pp. 306–307.

=== External links ===
- Cheney, David M. "Diocese of Cagli e Pergola". Catholic-Hierarchy.org. (for Chronology of Bishops) ^{[self-published]}
- Chow, Gabriel. "Diocese of Cagli". GCatholic.org. (for Chronology of Bishops) ^{[self-published]}
- Cheney, David M. "Roman Catholic Diocese of San Marino-Montefeltro". Catholic-Hierarchy.org. (for Chronology of Bishops) ^{[self-published]}
- Chow, Gabriel. "Diocese of San Marino-Montefeltro (Italy)". GCatholic.org. (for Chronology of Bishops) ^{[self-published]}

Catholic Church titles
Preceded by Bernardino de Leis	Bishop of Cagli; 1506–1507	Succeeded by Giorgio Benigno Salviati
Preceded by Luca de Mellinis	Bishop of Montefeltro; 1507–1510	Succeeded by Paolo Alessandri
