= Roman Catholic Diocese of Sarno =

Former Roman Catholic diocese

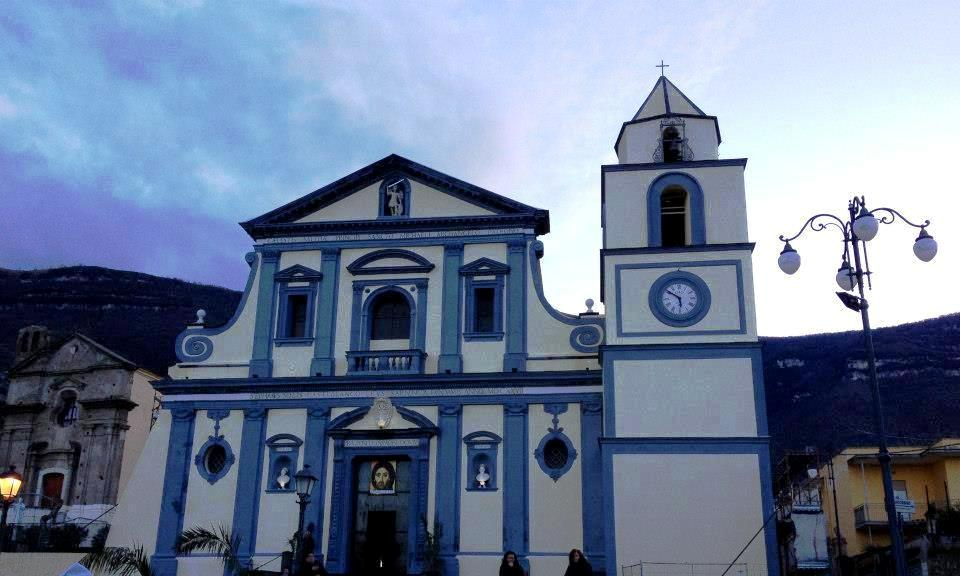
Co-cathedral of Sarno

The Diocese of Sarno (Latin: Dioecesis Sarnensis) was a Roman Catholic diocese located in the town of Sarno in the province of Salerno in the Campania region of Italy. It is 21 km directly east of Mt. Vesuvius, and 10.5 km north of Nocera de' Pagani. In 1818, it was united with the Diocese of Cava de' Tirreni to form the Diocese of Cava e Sarno.

== History ==
In 1051, Pope Leo IX granted Archbishop John of Salerno the privilege of choosing and consecrating bishops for his six suffragan dioceses, while the pope relinquished his rights in the same matters. In 1058, Pope Stephen IX repeated the privilege of Leo IX for Archbishop Alfanus. In 1066, relying on these privileges, Archbishop Alfanus created the new diocese of Sarno, and appointed and consecrated its first bishop, Risus. The archbishop also determined the boundaries of the new diocese.

=== Chapter and cathedral ===
The cathedral of Sarno was established and built by Bishop Risus, and dedicated to Saint Michael the Archangel. It was repeatedly restored and rebuilt.

The cathedral was served and administered by an ecclesiastical body called the Chapter, which was composed of four dignities (the Primicerius, the Archdeacon, the Cantor, and the Archpriest) and eight canons. In 1760, there were four dignities and twelve canons. There were two other parishes inside Sarno, a city of about 5,000 persons.

==== Seminary ====
The seminary was opened by Bishop Antonio d'Aquino (1595–1618), in the old episcopal palace, and financed with the income from twenty-two simple benefices. The seminary in Sarno was closed in 1818, when Pope Pius VII joined the diocese to that of Cava de' Tirreni, and the students transferred to the seminary in Cava.

=== Election of 1311 ===
Following the death of Bishop Ruggiero in 1311, the cathedral Chapter met to select a new bishop. There were two factions, and each separately elected its candidate. The larger number opted for Abbot Matthew of the Benedictine monastery of Mary, Mother of God, in Salerno; the minority chose Ruggiero de Canalibus, a canon of the cathedral of Salerno. The candidates found irregularities in the electoral process, and appealed to their Metropolitan in Salerno, though he was only archbishop-elect. The suit was heard by Joannes Rogerii, Archdeacon of Reggio Calabriae, on behalf of the archbishop-elect, and the parties then chose to appeal to the pope in Avignon. Abbot Matthew resigned his claims to the pope, while Ruggiero de Canalibus already assumed control over the diocese of Sarno. On 23 May 1311, Pope Clement V wrote to the bishops of Aversa and Pozzuoli, ordering them to investigate the affair and send him a report. Ruggiero was given two months to present himself in person before the pope in Avignon. Evidently he was eventually confirmed.

From 1516 to 1540, the diocese was ruled by five cardinals in succession, each administering the diocese through Vicars.

=== Concordat of 1818 ===
Following the extinction of the Napoleonic Kingdom of Italy, the Congress of Vienna authorized the restoration of the Papal States and the Kingdom of Naples. Since the French occupation had seen the abolition of many Church institutions in the Kingdom, as well as the confiscation of most Church property and resources, it was imperative that Pope Pius VII and King Ferdinand IV reach agreement on restoration and restitution. Ferdinand, however, was not prepared to accept the pre-Napoleonic situation, in which Naples was a feudal subject of the papacy. Lengthy, detailed, and acrimonious negotiations ensued.

In 1818, a new concordat with the Kingdom of the Two Sicilies committed the pope to the suppression of more than fifty small dioceses in the kingdom. The ecclesiastical province of Salerno was affected. Pope Pius VII, in the bull "De Utiliori" of 27 June 1818, chose to suppress the diocese of Sarno completely, and assign its people and territory to the diocese of Cava de'Terreni. In the same concordat, the King was confirmed in the right to nominate candidates for vacant bishoprics, subject to the approval of the pope. That situation persisted down until the final overthrow of the Bourbon monarchy in 1860.

=== Diocesan reorganization of 1986 ===
The Second Vatican Council (1962–1965), in order to ensure that all Catholics received proper spiritual attention, decreed the reorganization of the diocesan structure of Italy and the consolidation of small and struggling dioceses. It also recommended the abolition of anomalous units such as exempt territorial prelatures.

On 18 February 1984, the Vatican and the Italian State signed a new and revised concordat. Based on the revisions, a set of Normae was issued on 15 November 1984, which was accompanied in the next year, on 3 June 1985, by enabling legislation. According to the agreement, the practice of having one bishop govern two separate dioceses at the same time, aeque personaliter, was abolished. Instead, the Vatican continued consultations which had begun under Pope John XXIII for the merging of small dioceses, especially those with personnel and financial problems, into one combined diocese.

On 30 September 1986, Pope John Paul II ordered that the dioceses of Nocera de'Pagani and Sarno be merged into one diocese with one bishop, with the Latin title Dioecesis Nucerina Paganorum-Sarnensis The seat of the diocese was to be in Nocera. The former cathedral in Sarno would be designated a "co-cathedral"., though there was to be only one cathedral Chapter; the former Chapter of Sarno was to be designated the Chapter of the Co-Cathedral. There was to be one seminary.

== Bishops of Sarno ==
Erected: 11th Century
Latin Name: Sarnensis
Metropolitan: Archdiocese of Salerno

=== From 1066 to 1500 ===
- Risus
- Ioannes
- Petrus
- Ioannes (c. 1179)
- Unfridus (c. 1180–1184)
- [Ignotus]
- Rogerius (1209–1216)
- Joannes (1216–1222)

...

- Angelo Cachaevulpe (1254– ? )
- Joannes ? (1265– ? )

...

- Guglielmo (1296– ? )
- Rogerius ? –1311)
- Rogerius (1311–1316)
- Giordano da Miramonte, O.P. (1316– ? )
- Nicholas ( ? –1333)
- Franciscus de Perusio, O.F.M. (1333– ? )
- Napoleone ( ? –1350)
- Theobaldus (1350–1372)
- Joannes Sicci Heroti di Teramo (1372– )

...

- Joannes (c. 1404–1418?) Roman Obedience
- Marco de Teramo (1418–1439)
- Andrea de Nola, O.F.M. (1439–1470)
- Leonardo (1470–1475)
- Antonio de' Pazzi (1475–1477)
- Joannes (Ebu) (1477–1481)
- Andrea de Rogeriis (1481–1496)
- Agostino d'Estouteville (1496–1501 Resigned)

=== From 1500 to 1594 ===
- Giorgio Maccafano de' Pireto (1501–1513)
- Cardinal Francisco de Remolins (1513–1517 Resigned) Apostolic administrator
- Ludovico Platamone (1517–1518)
- Cardinal Silvio Passerini (1518–1519 Resigned) Apostolic administrator
- Guglielmo Bertrand (1519–1525)
- Cardinal Silvio Passerini (1525–1529) Apostolic administrator
- Cardinal Andrea Matteo Palmieri (1529–1530 Resigned) Apostolic administrator
- Cardinal Pompeo Colonna (1530–1532) Apostolic administrator
- Cardinal Andrea Matteo Palmieri (1532–1534 Resigned) Apostolic administrator
- Luigi Gomez (1534–1543)
- Francesco Sfondrati (1543–1544 Appointed, Archbishop of Amalfi)
- Marino Ruffino (1544–1547 Appointed, Bishop of Melfi e Rapolla)
- Donato Martuccio (Maricucci) (1547–1548 Resigned)
- Guglielmo Tuttavilla (1548–1569)
- Vincenzo Ercolano (Herculani), O.P. (1569–1573 Appointed, Bishop of Imola)
- Vincenzo da Ceprano, O.P. (1573–1578)
- Paolo Fusco (1578–1583 Died)
- Girolamo Matteucci (1583–1594)

=== From 1595 to 1818 ===
- Antonio d'Aquino (1595–1618 Appointed, Archbishop of Taranto)
- Stefano Solis Castelblanco, Theat. (1618–1657)
- Antonio de Matteis Corano (1659–1665)
- Sisto Maria Pironti, O.P. (1666–1673)
- Niccolò Antonio De Tura (1673–1706)
- Marco Antonio Attaffi (1706–1718 Appointed, Bishop of Squillace)
- Didaco Di Pace (1718–1737)
- Francesco De Novellis (1738–1760)
- Giovanni Saverio Pirelli (1760–1792 Resigned)
- Lorenzo Potenza (1792–1811)

○ After Potenza's death, the diocese was governed by Bishop Vicncenzo Torrusto of Nola, acting as Vicar Capitular (1811–1815; then by the elected Vicar-capitular, Archdeacon Agnello de Vivo (1815–1818).

27 June 1818: Sarno was united with the Diocese of Cava de' Tirreni to form the Diocese of Cava e Sarno

== See also ==
- Diocese of Cava de' Tirreni
- Catholic Church in Italy

== Sources ==
=== Reference Works ===
- Eubel, Conradus, ed. (1913). Hierarchia catholica (in Latin). Vol. 1 (Tomus 1) (second ed.). Münster: Libreria Regensbergiana. p. 436.. Archived.
- Eubel, Conradus, ed. (1914). Hierarchia catholica (in Latin). Vol. 2 (Tomus 2) (second ed.). Münster: Libreria Regensbergiana. p. 230.. Archived.
- Eubel, Conradus, ed. (1923). Hierarchia catholica (in Latin). Vol. 3 (Tomus 3) (second ed.). Münster: Libreria Regensbergiana. p. 293.. Archived.
- Gams, Pius Bonifatius (1873). Series episcoporum Ecclesiae catholicae: quotquot innotuerunt a beato Petro apostolo. Ratisbon: Typis et Sumptibus Georgii Josephi Manz. pp. 906-907. (Use with caution; obsolete)
- Gauchat, Patritius (Patrice) (1935). Hierarchia catholica (in Latin). Vol. IV (1592-1667). Münster: Libraria Regensbergiana.
- Ritzler, Remigius; Sefrin, Pirminus (1952). Hierarchia catholica medii et recentis aevi (in Latin). Vol. V (1667-1730). Patavii: Messagero di S. Antonio.
- Ritzler, Remigius; Sefrin, Pirminus (1958). Hierarchia catholica medii et recentis aevi (in Latin). Vol. VI (1730-1799). Patavii: Messagero di S. Antonio.
- Ritzler, Remigius; Sefrin, Pirminus (1968). Hierarchia Catholica medii et recentioris aevi (in Latin). Vol. VII (1800–1846). Monasterii: Libr. Regensburgiana.
- Ritzler, Remigius; Sefrin, Pirminus (1978). Hierarchia catholica Medii et recentioris aevi (in Latin). Vol. VIII (1846–1903). Il Messaggero di S. Antonio.
- Pięta, Zenon (2002). Hierarchia catholica medii et recentioris aevi (in Latin). Vol. IX (1903–1922). Padua: Messagero di San Antonio. ISBN 978-88-250-1000-8.

=== Studies ===
- Cappelletti, Giuseppe (1870). Le chiese d'Italia: dalla loro origine sino ai nostri giorni (in Italian). Vol. 21 (vigesimoprimo). Venezia: G. Antonelli. pp. 375–380.
- D'Avino, Vincenzo (1848). Cenni storici sulle chiese arcivescovili, vescovili, e prelatizie (nulluis) del Regno delle Due Sicilie (in Italian). Napoli: Ranucci. pp. 620–630.
- Kehr, Paul Fridolin. Italia Pontificia (in Latin), Vol. VIII: Regnum Normannum — Campania (Berlin: Weidmann 1935). p. 303.
- Normandia, Giacinto (1851). Notizie storiche ed industriali della città di Sarno. (in Italian) Napoli: Vaglio 1851. [list of bishops at pp. 157-189].
- Pace, Francesco Paolo (1886). Memorie sulla Chiesa Cattedrale di Sarno. (in Italian). Aniello 1886.
- Ruocco, Silvio (1946, 1952, 1957). Storia di Sarno e dintorni. (in Italian). 3 volumes. M. Gallo e figli.
- Ughelli, Ferdinando; Coleti, NIccolo (1721). Italia sacra sive De episcopis Italiæ, et insularum adjacentium (in Latin). Vol. 7 (Tomus septimus). Venice: apud Sebastianum Coleti. pp. 570–582.
