= Diocese of Cagli-Pergola =

Latin Catholic diocese in Italy (4th century - 1986)

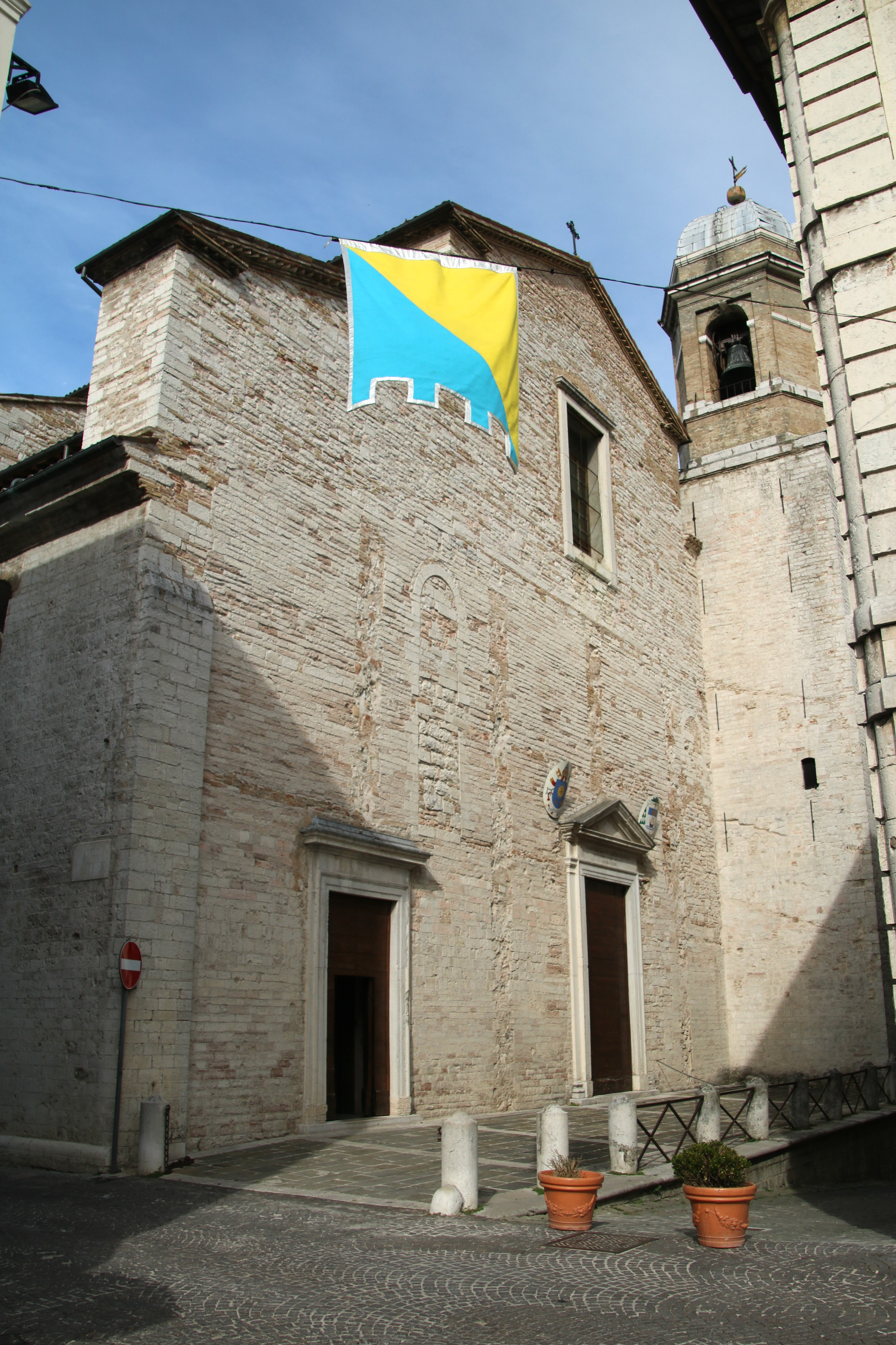
Co-cathedral of S. Maria Assunta, Cagli

The diocese of Cagli e Pergola was a Latin Church diocese of the Catholic Church in the Marche, central Italy, in the province of Pesaro and Urbino. Until 1563 it was under the direct supervision of the Roman pontiff. In that year, the diocese of Urbino was elevated to metropolitan status, and Cagli became a suffragan see of Urbino. The diocese was abolished as an independent entity in 1986, when it was incorporated into the diocese of Fano-Fossombrone-Cagli-Pergola. It was still a suffragan of the archdiocese of Urbino.

The historical diocese of Cagli was renamed in 1819. Pergola, which had been in the diocese of Urbino, was raised to the rank of an episcopal city and united to the See of Cagli.

== History ==
The diocese of Cagli does not appear in the evidence until the 8th century. Louis Duchesne believed that it might have been a "resurrection" of the diocese of Pitinum Mergens. Only one bishop of Pitinum is known, Romanus in 499.

Bishop Egidio (1233–1259) had many controversies with the municipality of Gubbio. Under his successor Bishop Morandus, the Ghibellines revolted against the papal power. After the death of Bishop Jacopo (1276), the Ghibelline canons wished to elect a noble, Berardo Berardi, while the Guelphs elected Rinaldo Sicardi, Abbot of San Pietro di Massa. As a result the see remained vacant for some years. Finally Berardo was made bishop of Osimo in 1283, and Sicardi died, whereupon Guglielmo Saxonis was elected bishop (1285) and approved by Pope Honorius IV. Civil discords, however, did not cease, and after a terrible massacre, Cagli was burned by its own citizens.

The town was immediately rebuilt on the plain of St. Angelo, and, on 10 March 1289, Pope Nicholas IV (1288–1292) named it S. Angelo papale. After his death, however, the original name of Cagli was restored.

In 1297 the first stone of the new cathedral was laid by the Bishop Lituardo Cervati, and in 1398 Niccolò Marciari brought the building to completion. It was dedicated to the Virgin Mary, under the title Assumption. The cathedral was staffed and administered by a corporation called the Chapter, consisting of two dignities (the Provost, and the Archdeacon) and eleven canons, one of whom was the Theologus (preacher). There were also twelve chaplains, who were not members of the Chapter.

In 1503 the partisans of Cesare Borgia killed the Franciscan bishop Gasparo Golfi. His successor on 8 March 1503, a Spanish Dominican, Ludovico de Lagoria, who was a promoter of Borgia's outrages, was nearly killed by the people of Cagli during his first entry into the city. To restore order, Pope Julius II transferred Langoria to the diocese of Lavelli in the Kingdom of Naples on 23 February 1504.

On 4 June 1563, Pope Pius IV signed the bull "Super Universas", by which he elevated the diocese of Urbino to the status of metropolitan archdiocese. He assigned as suffragan dioceses of the new ecclesiastical province Cagli, Sinigaglia, Pesaro, Fossombrone, Montefeltro, and Gubbio. The diocese of Cagli was no longer directly dependent upon the papacy.

The territory of Cagli suffered a major earthquake on 3 June 1781. Practically the entire city was ruined. The cupola of the cathedral collapsed, causing the death of the celebrant of a Mass which was in progress, Canon Ugolinucci, and sixty-five attendees. The church of Palcano was destroyed, causing the death of twenty-two persons; the church of S. Cristoforo della Carda registered six deaths; the church of S. Donato dei Pecorari lost its parish priest and some sixty parishioners. Bishop Lodovico Agostino Bertozzi (1754-1802) wrote a detailed letter to Cardinal Leonardo Antonelli, the Prefect of the Congregation of the Propaganda of the Faith and Protector of the diocese of Cagli, revealing the extent of the catastrophe. Pope Pius VI responded with generous funds, allowing not only for the rebuilding of the cathedral and much of the city, but also for the foundation of useful institutions, a hospital for the sick and an orphanage for poor girls. Bertozzi was also responsible for the foundation of a seminary, sufficient for 40 students. The bishop's assistant in the reconstruction over the succeeding twenty-five years was his Vicar-General and eventual successor, Alfonso Cingari.

=== French occupation ===
When the forces of the revolutionary French Republic invaded the Romagna in 1797, they obtained the Romagna, including Cagli, by the Treaty of Tolentino of 19 February 1797. When they arrived at Cagli, the Vicar General Cingari in a kindly spirit welcomed the commander and accompanied him to the episcopal palace to meet the ninety-four year old Bishop Bertozzi. They mollified the French with their accommodating attitude and prudence, a policy which was several times approved of by Pope Pius VI. Bishop Bertozzi had asked the pope several times to accept his resignation on grounds of ill health and great age, but the presence of the French made it inadvisable. Circumstances in Rome were not so favorable, and on 15 February 1798, the French general Louis Berthier proclaimed the Roman Republic and deposed the pope. Pius was sent to Siena and then to Florence. On 28 March 1799, the pope was deported to France, where he died on 29 August. The Papal States and papal ecclesiastical control ceased to exist. When a new pope, Pius VII was elected on 14 March 1800, Bishop Bertozzi again requested permission to resign, but he was able to have Msgr. Cingari appointed Apostolic Commissary. to administer the diocese. Bertozzi died on 20 September 1802, at the age of 97. The Vicar General, Msgr. Cingari, pronounced Bertozzi's funeral oration on the 30th day commemorative Mass, on 20 October 1802. Cingari was promoted bishop of Cagli on 31 March 1806, and consecrated on 7 April.

In February 1808, Napoleon, Emperor of the French, occupied the Papal States, and, on 17 May 1809, annexed them to metropolitan France, creating new "departements," Tibère and Toscane. Cagli, formerly a subject of the pope, became a canton in the District of Urbino, in the Department of Ancona, in the Kingdom of Italy. In the same year, Napoleon, King of Italy, demanded oaths of allegiance to his kingdom and the Code Napoleon of the bishops of the Marches, Urbino, Camerino, and Macerata, who had formerly sworn their oaths to the pope. On 28 May 1808, the bishop was sent a notice, requiring him to appear in person in Milan before 15 July to swear his oath to the Viceroy. Bishop Cingari refused the oath, and was deported, first to Mantua, and then to Bergamo, where he was held in confinement in the convent of the Cappucini, and then again to Mantua. In mid-November 1813, he was ordered to be taken to Turin. He was carried to Milan, where he arrived on 18 November 1813, too ill to be taken any farther. He was in Milan for several months, until news of French defeats by the allies brought his release. He was able to return to Cagli in May 1814. He had been in exile for nearly five years.

==== Pergola ====
Pope Pius VII, who excommunicated Napoleon on 11 June 1809 in the bull "Quum memoranda", was arrested by the French on 5 July 1809 and deported to Savona. Pius refused thereafter to perform any papal acts whatever, and the bishops nominated by Napoleon never received canonical approval or installation. After the fall of Napoleon, he was able to return to Rome, on 24 May 1814, to face a major task of political and ecclesiastical reconstruction and repair.

The ecclesiastical situation in Pergola had been confused for some time. Much of the city was in the diocese of Gubbio, but individual parishes belonged to the monastery of Nonantola, the monastery of Sitria, the monastery of Fonte Avellana, and the diocese of Cagli. Other parts belonged to the diocese of Nocera. Having consulted with the prelates concerned and with members of the College of Cardinals, Pius VII issued the bull "Romani pontifices" on 31 January 1818, granting all the jurisdictions in the territory of Pergola to the diocese of Cagli. To compensate the bishop of Gubbio for his loss of income, the people of Pergola were required to pay the bishop an annual sum of fifty scudi. On 25 May 1818, Msgr. Carlo Monti, Bishop of Sarsina, was transferred to the diocese of Cagli.

On 18 January 1819, Pope Pius VII issued the bull "Commissa tenuitati", by which he raised the territory of Pergola to the status of a diocese, which was permanently attached, aeque personaliter, to the bishop of Cagli. The collegiate church of S. Andrea was chosen as the new cathedral of Pergola; the college of canons was suppressed, and its Augustinian Canons moved to the vacant church and monastery of the Conventual Franciscans at S. Francesco. A new Chapter of canons was established to staff and administer the cathedral, consisting of three dignities (the Provost, the Archdeacon, and the Archpriest) and eleven secular canons. The bishop was required to live in Pergola for four months out of the year. The establishment of a seminary for training priests was ordered, in accordance with the decrees of the Council of Trent; initially it was to be housed in the former convent of the Canons Regular at S. Andrea, along with the bishop's residence, and the diocesan offices.

On 18 January 1819, Bishop Carlo Monti of Cagli became Bishop of Cagli e Pergola.

=== End of the diocese ===
In a decree of the Second Vatican Council, it was recommended that dioceses be reorganized to take into account modern developments. A project begun on orders from Pope John XXIII, and continued under his successors, was intended to reduce the number of dioceses in Italy and to rationalize their borders in terms of modern population changes and shortages of clergy. The change was made urgent because of changes made to the Concordat between the Italian State and the Holy See on 18 February 1984, and embodied in a law of 3 June 1985. The reorganization was approved by Pope John Paul II in an audience of 27 September 1986, and by a decree of the Sacred Congregation of Bishops of the Papal Curia on 30 September 1986. The diocese of Fano was united to the dioceses of Cagli e Pergola and of Fossombrone. Its name was to be Fanensis-Forosemproniensis-Calliensis-Pergulanus. The seat of the diocese was to be in Fano. The former cathedral in Cagli and the former cathedral in Fossombrone were to have the honorary title of co-cathedral, and their chapters were to be called the "Capitulum Concathedralis". There was to be only one episcopal curia, one seminary, one ecclesiastical tribunal; and all the clergy were to be incardinated in the diocese of Fano-Fossombrone-Caglia-Pergola. The combined diocese was suffragan of the Archdiocese of Urbino-Urbania-Sant'Angelo in Vado. The diocese of Cagli ceased to exist.

== Bishops ==
=== Diocese of Cagli ===
Latin Name: Calliensis

=== to 1429 ===
[Gratianus (ca. 359)]
...
[Viticianus (ca. 500)]
...
[Anastasius (ca. 731)]
...?

- Rodulphus (ca. 761)
- Juvianus (attested 769)

[Aldefredus] (774]
...

- Passivo (attested 826)

...

- Andreas (attested 853)

...

- Justinus / Martinus (attested 861)

...

- Joannes (attested 881)

...

- Martinus (attested 898)

...

- Joannes (attested 967–968)

...

- Luitulphus ( – 1045)
- Marcus (by 1050 – 1058)
- Hugo, O.S.B. (1059 – )
- Joannes ? (attested 1068)
- Hugo (attested 1070–1093)
- Ambrosius (attested 1106 or 1116)
- Quiricus (1128 – 1156)
- Ranerius, O.S.B (1156 – 1175)
- Allodericus (ca. 1175 – 1211)
- Anselmus (1217 – )
- Albertus (1229 – )
- Aegidius, O.S.B. (1233 – 1259)
- Thomas Morandus, O.P. (1259 – 1265)
- Hugolinus (1266 – ca. 1269)
- Jacobus (1270 – 1276)
- Reynaldus Siccardi (1276 – ? )
- Guillelmus Saxonis (1285 – 1295)
- Octavianus, O.S.A. (1296)
- Angelus de Camerino, O.E.S.A. (1296 – 1298)
- Liutardus (1298 – 1301 ?)
- Joannes (attested 1304)
- Rogerius Todini, O.F.M. (attested 1315 – 1318)
- Petrus (1319 – 1328)
- Albertus de Sicardis, O.F.M. (1328 – 1342)
- Guido de Callio (1342–1347)
- Petrus, O.P. (1348 – 1353)
- Thomas Sferrato, O.F.M. (1353 – 1378)
- Augustinus, O.E.S.A. (1378 – 1395) Roman Obedience

Augustinus (1395 – 1397) Administrator (Roman Obedience)

- Nicolaus Marciari (1398 – 1413) Roman Obedience
- Giovanni Buono de Lutiis (3 November 1413 – 1429)

=== from 1429 to 1842 ===
Metropolitan: Archdiocese of Urbino (from 1563)

- Genesius da Parma (7 December 1429 – 1439)
- Antonio Severini (14 Dec 1439 - 1444)
- Simone Pauli (14 Oct 1444 - Oct 1460 Died)
- Bartolomeo Torelli, O.P. (23 Jul 1494 - 1496 Died)
- Gaspare Golfi, O.F.M. (5 May 1498 - 1503 Died)
- Ludovico de Lagoria, O.P. (8 Mar 1503 - 1504)
- Bernardino de Leis, C.R.L. (23 Feb 1504 - 6 Jan 1506 Died)
- Antonio Castriani (Antonio Crastini), O.F.M. (17 Mar 1506 - 1507
- Giorgio Benigno Salviati, O.F.M. (21 May 1507 - 1513)
- Tommaso Albini (Tommaso Albizi), O.P. ( 1513 - 1524 Resigned)
- Cristoforo Guidalotti Ciocchi del Monte (10 Feb 1525 - 1550)
- Giovanni Ciocchi del Monte (27 Jun 1550 - 10 Aug 1554 Died)
- Cristoforo Guidalotti Ciocchi del Monte (9 Mar 1556 - 27 Oct 1564 Died)
- Giovanni Battista Torleoni (7 Feb 1565 - 20 Jul 1567 Died)
- Paolo Maria della Rovere (8 Oct 1567 - 1591 Died)
- Ascanio Libertano (Ascanio Libertani) (19 Jul 1591 - 10 Mar 1607 Died)
- Timocrate Aloigi (Democrate Aloisi) (14 May 1607 - 17 Feb 1610 Died)
- Filippo Bigli (Bili), C.R. (17 May 1610 - 24 Aug 1629 Died)
- Giovanni Francesco Passionei (3 Dec 1629 - 1641
- Pacifico Trani (Trasi), O.F.M. (24 Mar 1642 - 31 Dec 1659 Died)
- Castracane De' Castracani (5 May 1660 - 17 Oct 1669 Died)
- Andrea Tamantini (6 Oct 1670 - Mar 1685 Died)
- Giulio Giacomo Castellani, O.S.A. (1 Apr 1686 - Jan 1694 Died)
- Benedetto Luperti (19 Apr 1694 - 23 Sep 1709 Died)
- Alfonso De' Bellincini (7 Apr 1710 - 12 Jun 1721 Died)
- Gianfrancesco De’ Bisleti (24 Sep 1721 - 1726)
- Girolamo Maria Allegri, O.S.M. (9 Dec 1726 - 5 Jul 1744 Died)
- Silvestro Lodovico Paparelli (7 Sep 1744 - 6 Oct 1754 Died)
- Lodovico Agostino Bertozzi (16 Dec 1754 - 20 Sep 1802 Retired)
- Alfonso Cingari (31 Mar 1806 - 14 Jun 1817 Died)
- Carlo Monti (25 May 1818 - 7 Jan 1842 Died)

=== Diocese of Cagli e Pergola ===
Name Changed: 18 January 1819
Latin Name: Calliensis e Pergulanus
Metropolitan: Archdiocese of Urbino

- Bonifacio Cajani (22 Jul 1842 - 9 Jun 1863 Died)
- Francesco Andreoli (21 Dec 1863 - 9 May 1875 Died)
- Luigi Raffaele Zampetti (5 Jul 1875 - 29 Sep 1876}
- Gioachino Cantagalli (29 Sep 1876 - 10 Nov 1884 Appointed, Bishop of Faenza)
- Giovanni Battista Scotti (10 Nov 1884 - 18 May 1894
- Giuseppe Maria Aldanesi (18 Mar 1895 - 16 May 1906 Resigned)
- Ettore Fronzi (12 Sep 1908 - 14 Dec 1918 Appointed, Archbishop of Camerino)
- Augusto Curi (23 Dec 1918 - 5 May 1925 Appointed, Archbishop of Bari-Canosa)
- Giuseppe Venturi (9 Jul 1926 - 18 Feb 1931 Appointed, Archbishop of Chieti)
- Filippo Mantini (22 Jun 1931 - 13 Mar 1939 Died)
- Raffaele Campelli (8 Aug 1939 - 15 Jan 1977 Retired)
- Costanzo Micci (15 Jan 1977 - 4 Sep 1985 Died)
- Mario Cecchini (11 Feb 1986 - 30 Sep 1986 Appointed, Bishop of Fano-Fossombrone-Cagli-Pergola)

30 September 1986: United with the Diocese of Fano and the Diocese of Fossombrone to form the Diocese of Fano-Fossombrone-Cagli-Pergola

== Books ==
- Eubel, Conradus, ed. (1913). Hierarchia catholica, Tomus 1 (second ed.). Münster: Libreria Regensbergiana. (in Latin)
- Eubel, Conradus, ed. (1914). Hierarchia catholica, Tomus 2 (second ed.). Münster: Libreria Regensbergiana.
- Eubel, Conradus; Gulik, Guilelmus, eds. (1923). Hierarchia catholica, Tomus 3 (second ed.). Münster: Libreria Regensbergiana.
- Gams, Pius Bonifatius (1873). Series episcoporum Ecclesiae catholicae: quotquot innotuerunt a beato Petro apostolo (in Latin). Ratisbon: Typis et Sumptibus Georgii Josephi Manz.
- Gauchat, Patritius (Patrice) (1935). Hierarchia catholica IV (1592-1667). Münster: Libraria Regensbergiana.
- Ritzler, Remigius; Sefrin, Pirminus (1952). Hierarchia catholica medii et recentis aevi V (1667-1730). Patavii: Messagero di S. Antonio.
- Ritzler, Remigius; Sefrin, Pirminus (1958). Hierarchia catholica medii et recentis aevi VI (1730-1799). Patavii: Messagero di S. Antonio.

=== Studies ===
- Baratta, Mario (1896). Sul terremoto di Cagli del 3 giugno 1781. (in Italian). Roma: presso la Società geografica italiana, 1896.
- Broers, Michael (2002). Politics and Religion in Napoleonic Italy: The War Against God, 1801-1814. London & New York: Routledge.
- Cappelletti, Giuseppe (1845). Le Chiese d'Italia dalla loro origine sino ai nostri giorni (in Italian). Vol. terzo (3). Venezia: Antonelli. pp. 233–263.
- Ceccarelli, Giuseppe (2005). I vescovi delle diocesi di Fano, Fossombrone, Cagli e Pergola: cronotassi : con brevi cenni storici e artistici sulle origini delle città e delle diocesi. Fano: Fondazione Cassa di risparmio di Fano, 2005.
- Dromedari, Giuseppe; Presciutti, Gabriele; Presciutti, Maurizio. Il terremoto di Cagli del 3 giugno 1781. Cronache dagli archivi. (in Italian) Youcanprint, 2017.
- Duchesne, Louis (1903), "Les évêchés d'Italie et l'invasion lombarde," (in French), in: Mélanges d'archéologie et d'histoire 23 (Paris: Fontemoing 1903), pp. 83–116.
- Lanzoni, Francesco (1927). Le diocesi d'Italia dalle origini al principio del secolo VII (an. 604). Faenza: F. Lega. (in Italian).
- Schwartz, Gerhard (1907). Die Besetzung der Bistümer Reichsitaliens unter den sächsischen und salischen Kaisern: mit den Listen der Bischöfe, 951-1122. (in German). Leipzig: B.G. Teubner. pp. 241–242.
- Tarducci, Antonio (1896). De'Vescovi Di Cagli. (in Italian). Tip. Balloni, 1896.
- Ughelli, Ferdinando; Coleti, Niccolo (1717). Italia sacra sive de Episcopis Italiae, et insularum adjacentium (in Latin). Vol. 2 (Tomus secundus) (secunda ed.). Venice: Apud Sebastianum Coleti. pp. 808–826.
