= Giuseppe Boncore =

Roman Catholic Bishop (1652–1687)

Most Reverend Giuseppe Boncore
- Bishop of Lavello
- Church: Catholic Church
- Diocese: Diocese of Lavello
- In office: 1652–1687
- Predecessor: Francesco de' Notari
- Successor: Bartolomeo Rosa

Orders
- Consecration: 21 May 1652 by Marcantonio Franciotti

Personal details
- Died: 23 June 1687 Lavello, Italy

Giuseppe Boncore (died 23 June 1687) was a Roman Catholic prelate who served as Bishop of Lavello (1652–1687).

== Biography ==
On 13 May 1652, Giuseppe Boncore was appointed during the papacy of Pope Innocent X as Bishop of Lavello. On 21 May 1652, he was consecrated bishop by Marcantonio Franciotti, Cardinal-Priest of Santa Maria della Pace, with Giambattista Spada, Titular Patriarch of Constantinople, and Giovanni Battista Buonacorsi, Bishop of Colle di Val d'Elsa, serving as co-consecrators. He served as Bishop of Lavello until his death on 23 June 1687.

== External links and additional sources ==
- Cheney, David M. "Diocese of Lavello". Catholic-Hierarchy.org. (Chronology of Bishops) ^{[self-published]}
- Chow, Gabriel. "Titular Episcopal See of Lavello". GCatholic.org. (Chronology of Bishops) ^{[self-published]}

Catholic Church titles
Preceded by Francesco de' Notari	Bishop of Lavello; 1652–1687	Succeeded by Bartolomeo Rosa
