= Castro, Apulia =

Castro Griko: Kàstro
- Comune
- Comune di Castro
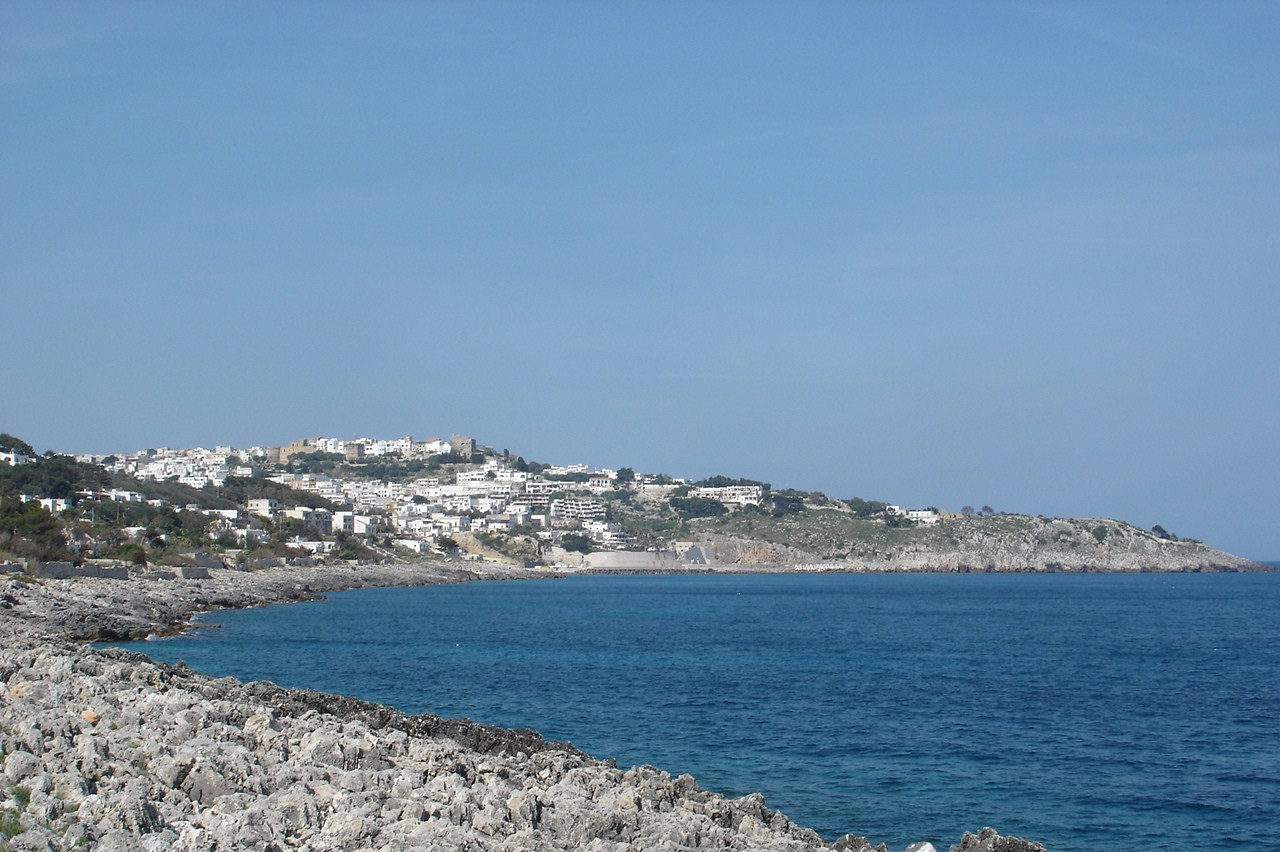
- Castro

- Coat of arms

- Location within Italy Location within Apulia
- Coordinates: 40°1′N 18°24′E
- Country: Italy
- Region: Apulia
- Province: Lecce (LE)
- Frazioni: Castro Marina

Government
  - Mayor: Luigi Fersini

Area
  - Total: 4.56 km^{2} (1.76 sq mi)
- Elevation: 100 m (330 ft)

Population (30 June 2017)
  - Total: 2,395
  - Density: 525/km^{2} (1,360/sq mi)
- Demonym: Castrensi or Castrioti
- Time zone: UTC+1 (CET)
  - Summer (DST): UTC+2 (CEST)
- Postal code: 73030
- Dialing code: 0836
- ISTAT code: 075096
- Patron saint: Maria SS. Annunziata (principal) and Santa Dorotea
- Saint day: 25 April and 6 February
- Website: Official website

Castro (Salentino: Casciu) is a town and comune in the Italian province of Lecce in the Apulia region of south-eastern Italy.

== History ==
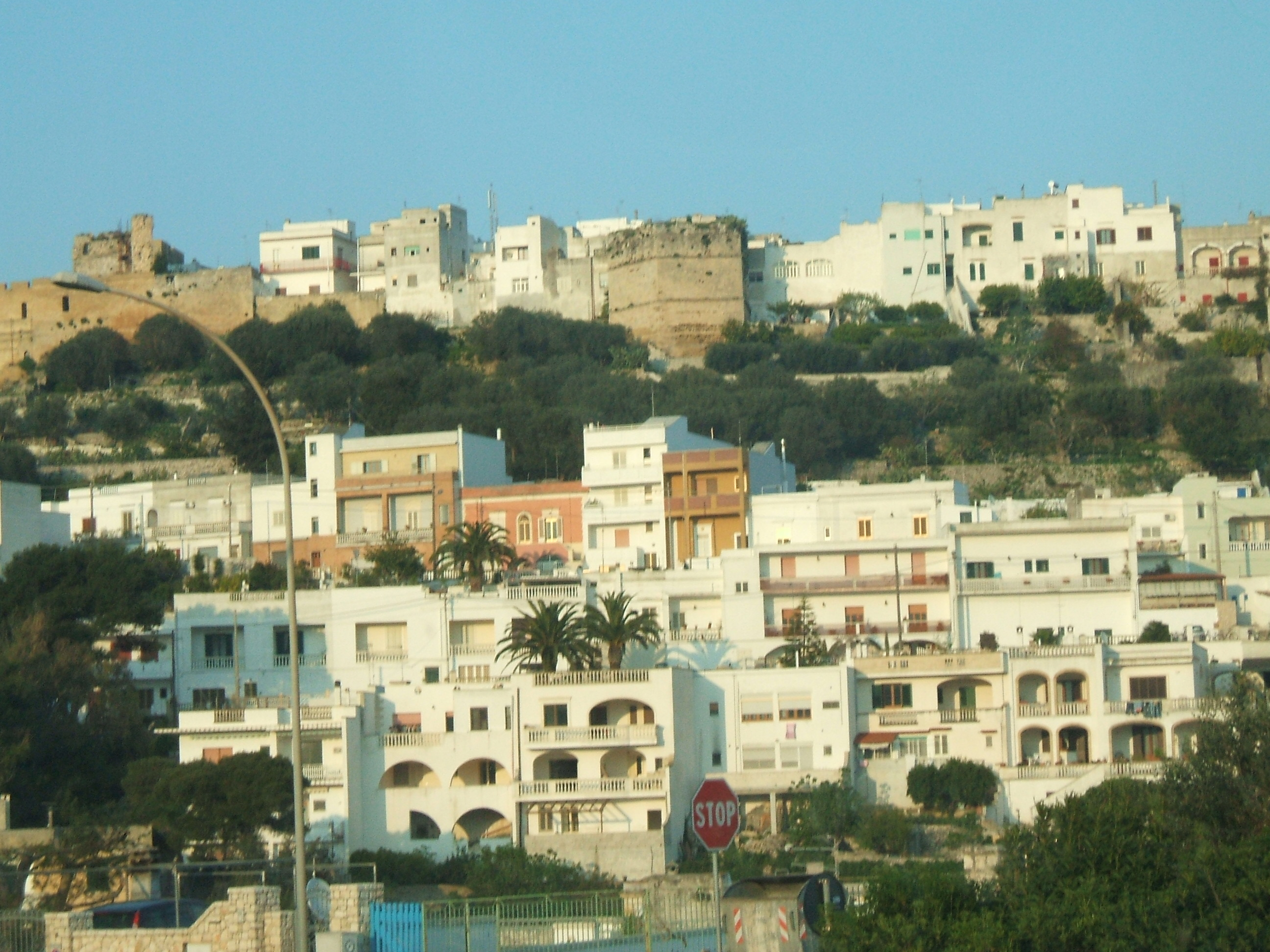
Castro Marina

Castro derives its name from Castrum Minervae (Latin for "Athena's castle"), which was an ancient town of the Sallentini, about 15 kilometres (9 mi) south of Hydruntum. Its ancient temple of Minerva was said to have been founded by Idomeneus, who formed the tribe of the Sallentini from a mixture of Cretans, Illyrians and Italian Locrians (Central Greek tribe).

It is also said to have been the place where Aeneas first landed in Italy, the port of which he named Portus Veneris ("Port of Venus"). The temple had lost some of its importance in Strabo's day.

Castro has been since 1969 a Titular see of the Roman Catholic Church; its Latin name is Castrensis in Apulia. Richard Sklba (1935–2024), auxiliary bishop of the Archdiocese of Milwaukee, was the incumbent in the early 2020s. In 2026, Bruno Musarò (1948-2026) was the archbishop, briefly, until his death.
