= Francesco D'Afflitto =

Most Reverend Francesco D'Afflitto
- Bishop of Scala
- Church: Catholic Church
- Diocese: Diocese of Scala
- In office: 1583–1593
- Predecessor: Feliciano Ninguarda
- Successor: Giovanni Battista Serignano

Orders
- Consecration: 13 November 1583 by Giulio Rossino

Personal details
- Died: 11 October 1593 Scala, Italy

Francesco D'Afflitto (died 11 October 1593) was a Roman Catholic prelate who served as Bishop of Scala (1583–1593). He descends from the princely house d’Afflitto.

== Biography ==
On 27 June 1583, Francesco D'Afflitto was appointed during the papacy of Pope Gregory XIII as Bishop of Scala. On 13 November 1583, he was consecrated bishop by Giulio Rossino, Archbishop of Amalfi, with Giovanni Bernardino Grandopoli, Bishop of Lettere-Gragnano, and Giovanni Agostino Campanile, Bishop of Minori, serving as co-consecrators. He served as Bishop of Scala until his death on 11 October 1593.

== See also ==
- Catholic Church in Italy

== External links and additional sources ==
- Cheney, David M. "Diocese of Scala". Catholic-Hierarchy.org. (for Chronology of Bishops) ^{[self-published]}
- Chow, Gabriel. "Titular Episcopal See of Scala". GCatholic.org. (for Chronology of Bishops) ^{[self-published]}

Catholic Church titles
Preceded by Feliciano Ninguarda	Bishop of Scala; 1583–1593	Succeeded by Giovanni Battista Serignano
