= Girolama Cartolari =

Italian printer (c. 1500–1559)

- Born: 1500; Perugia
- Died: 1559 (aged 58–59)
- Spouse: Baldassarre Cartolari (married c. 1524)

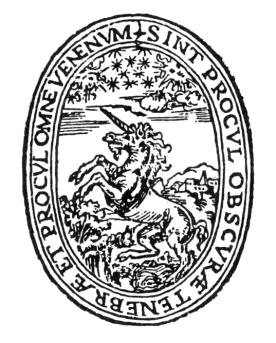
Printer's device of Girolama Cartolari

Girolama Cartolari (c. 1500–1559) was an Italian printer from Perugia active in Rome from 1543 to 1559. She was the wife of printer Baldassarre Cartolari and ran the Cartolari printing workshop in Rome after his death.

== Early life ==
Cartolari's place and exact date of birth are unknown. She was presumably born in Perugia, Italy or in the surrounding countryside around 1500 AD. This estimate comes from the known life expectancy in Italy during the pre-industrial era and her date of death in 1559.

=== Marriage with Baldassarre Cartolari ===
The date of Cartolari's marriage to Baldassarre is not known but likely occurred after 1524 since there is no mention of her in a legal document he signed that year. Thanks to this union, she became a member of the Cartolari family and adopted his last name with which she is remembered. In the first half of the 16th century, the Cartolari family was active and relevant in the typographical field in the city of Perugia (Umbria).

The long family tradition in the printing field can be traced back to Baldassarre's grandfather of the same name who, around 1445, moved from Papiano to Perugia to practice the paper-making activity first and then, towards the end of the century, became a typographer. It is further proven that both Baldassarre's father, Francesco, active between 1500 and 1518, and his elder brother, Girolamo, active between 1510 and 1549, were famous typographers.

=== From Perugia to Rome ===
Between 1538 and 1540, Girolama and Baldassarre moved to Rome, probably attracted there by the easy earning prospects offered by the Papal State, a significant cultural and political center. In 1543, after the death of Baldassarre, Girolama succeeded her husband, by inheritance, in running the printing workshop that was initially located in "Vico Peregrini," near Campo dei Fiori and the palace of the Apostolic Chancery, thus continuing on his fairly established and profitable printing business. She was responsible for moving the printing shop to new locations: from January 1545 to the end of 1547 in "Piazza del Parione," and from 1548 in "Piazza San Pietro" near Borgo.

== Career ==
The books produced by the printing workshop under her direction represent continuity with her spouse's work. Cartolari continued to print for various institutions associated with the Catholic Church. At the same time, she was also able to contribute to the printing of works from the lively cultural environment represented by the circle of writers revolving around the Farnese family, in particular its most important member, Pope Paul III.

For the sixteen years in which she assumed the direction of the family business, Cartolari produced up to twenty-six works a year. The first work she printed was the Tractatus reservationum papalium ac legatorum by Enea Falconi. She also printed a range of publications: ecclesiastical announcements, papal bulls, regulations issued by the Apostolic Chancery, orations, lectures from the Council of Trent, anti-Lutheran pamphlets written by the archbishop and famous theologian Lancelotto Politi, as well as ordinary documents. Among them are the works of the German astrologer Mathias Brottbeychel and works by the Perugian Tommaso Grifi. The press paid attention to Umbrian authors such as Gaspare da Perugia and Matteo Spinelli. Other publications printed by Cartolari are the works of the pontifical doctor Andrea Turini and his colleague Michelangelo Biondo, as well as Latin grammars edited by Giovanni Fabbrini and works by the humanists Gabriele Barri and Mambrino Roseo.

The relationship of Cartolari with authoritative booksellers and publishers, such as the Venetian Michele Tramezzino, is well documented. Tramezzino financed the printing of a dozen legal texts in Cartolari's printing shop but in 1547, when Tramezzino returned to Venice, the production of Cartolari decreased significantly. Around the same time, writer Michelangelo Biondo, a regular customer of Cartolari, also moved to Venice and established a printing shop. At the time, those who ran a printing business usually did not carry out the related function of publishers; it was usually the authors themselves, or people linked to them through patronage relationships, who financed the printing of their works. Only the printers with the highest volume of work, often the most popular and affluent, could bear the costs of publishing and perform this function. There is no evidence that Cartolari's activity continued after May 1559.

=== Unnoticed work ===
According to a study conducted by the University of Virginia Professor Deborah Parker on women in the book trade in Italy between the end of the 15th century and the beginning of the 17th century, the work of women printers and booksellers throughout history has gone unnoticed and has rarely been the object of study by scholars and researchers. Cartolari is one of the few women who signed their name on the works they printed. However, at the beginning of her career, she identified herself as the heir of her husband's activity, a practice that was very common at the time. In this period, most women did not print their names on the title page or in the colophon of the works they produced. Other times, as it happened to Cartolari, the evidence of their existence and activity has been altered in subsequent books and bibliographies. This happened for example, in G.M. Mazzucchelli's book titled "Gli Scrittori d'Italia", where the author lists Michelangelo Biondo's work and corrects Cartolari's first name changing it from Hieronymam to Hieronymum (Girolamo).

== Printer's device ==
The printer's device of Girolama Cartolari is an oval-shaped image with a unicorn in the center and with sun, moon, stars, and landscape printed in the background. A motto in Latin is inscribed on the border of this device: Sint procul obscurae tenebrae et procul omne venenum (let darkness and all poison be far away). The dimensions are 7.2 cm x 9.2 cm. Identification codes in the Italian registry for this printer's device are U729 and CNCM 2193.

== Selected works ==
Below is a selection of works produced in the printing shop of Girolama Cartolari, which was credited with the production of 111 works published in the 16th century.

- Gaspare da Perugia, Tractatus valde vtilis (1543)
- Antonio de Guevara, Institutione del prencipe christiano ..., curata da Mambrino Roseo (1543)
- Michelangelo Biondo, Compendiosa de medicamentis (1544)
- Giovanni Fabbrini, Della interpetatione della lingua latina per via della toschana libri III (1544)
- Lancelotto Politi, Compendio d'errori, et inganni luterani (1544)
- Tommaso Grifi, Diuinationi del anno MDXLVI (1545)
- Andrea Turini, Opera Andreae Thurini Pisciensis Pauli III pont. max. Medici (1545)
- Concilio di Trento, Nomina cognomina tituli, dignitates, prouinciae, et gradus omnium, qui praesentes fuerunt tertiae sessioni Concilii Tridentini (1546)
- Tommaso Grifi, Prognosticum super futuros (1546)
- Cancelleria Apostolica, Regula Cancellariae reuocationis expectatiuarum (1547-1548)
- Andrea Turini, Defensio contra Marcum Antonium Montisianum Geminiatensem (1549)
- Mathias Brottbeychel, Pronostico di messer Matthia alemano sopra la dispositione de l'anno MDLIII (1552)
- Tommaso Grifi, Prognosticum super futuros (1553)
- Matteo Spinelli, Praesagium in ecclesiasticarum copiarum praefecturam (1553)
