= Giovanni Agostino Campanile =

Roman Catholic prelate

The Most Reverend Giovanni Agostino Campanile
- Bishop of Minori
- Church: Catholic Church
- Diocese: Diocese of Minori
- In office: 1567–1594
- Predecessor: Giovanni D'Amato
- Successor: Orazio Basilisco

Orders
- Consecration: 31 August 1567 by Giulio Antonio Santorio

Personal details
- Died: 4 July 1594 Minori, Italy

Giovanni Agostino Campanile (died 4 July 1594) was a Roman Catholic prelate who served as Bishop of Minori (1567–1594).

== Biography ==
On 8 August 1567, Giovanni Agostino Campanile was appointed during the papacy of Pope Pius V as Bishop of Minori. On 31 August 1567, he was consecrated bishop by Giulio Antonio Santorio, Archbishop of Santa Severina, with Thomas Goldwell, Bishop of Saint Asaph, and Egidio Valenti, Bishop of Nepi e Sutri, serving as co-consecrators. He served as Bishop of Minori until his death on 4 July 1594.

== Episcopal succession ==
While bishop, he was the principal co-consecrator of:

- Serafino Fortibraccia, Bishop of Nemosia (1569), and
- Francesco D'Afflitto, Bishop of Scala (1583)

== See also ==
- Catholic Church in Italy

== External links and additional sources ==
- Cheney, David M. "Diocese of Minori". Catholic-Hierarchy.org. (for Chronology of Bishops) ^{[self-published]}
- Chow, Gabriel. "Titular Episcopal See of Minori (Italy)". GCatholic.org. (for Chronology of Bishops) ^{[self-published]}

Catholic Church titles
Preceded by Giovanni D'Amato	Bishop of Minori; 1567–1594	Succeeded by Orazio Basilisco
