= Alessandro Salati =

Most Reverend Alessandro Salati
- Bishop of Minori
- Church: Catholic Church
- Diocese: Diocese of Minori
- In office: 1498–1509
- Successor: Tommaso di Sicilia

Orders
- Consecration: 17 Jun 1498 by Andrea de Conto

Personal details
- Died: 1509 Minori, Italy

Alessandro Salati (died 1509) was a Roman Catholic prelate who served as Bishop of Minori (1498–1509).

== Biography ==
On 30 Apr 1498, Alessandro Salati was appointed during the papacy of Pope Alexander VI as Bishop of Minori. On 17 Jun 1498, he was consecrated bishop by Andrea de Conto, Archbishop of Amalfi, with Matteo Doti, Bishop of Scala, and Tommaso de Acciaro, Bishop of Satriano, serving as co-consecrators. He served as Bishop of Minori until his death in 1509.

== External links and additional sources ==
- Cheney, David M. "Diocese of Minori". Catholic-Hierarchy.org. (for Chronology of Bishops) ^{[self-published]}
- Chow, Gabriel. "Titular Episcopal See of Minori (Italy)". GCatholic.org. (for Chronology of Bishops) ^{[self-published]}

Catholic Church titles
Preceded by	Bishop of Minori; 1498–1509	Succeeded by Tommaso di Sicilia
