= Giovanni Pietro de Bono =

Roman Catholic prelate

Most Reverend Giovanni Pietro de Bono
- Bishop of Minori
- Church: Catholic Church
- Diocese: Diocese of Minori
- In office: 1526–1546
- Predecessor: Tommaso di Sicilia
- Successor: Ambrogio Catarino Politi

Personal details
- Died: 6 June 1546 Minori, Italy

Giovanni Pietro de Bono, O.P. (died 1546) was a Roman Catholic prelate who served as Bishop of Minori (1526–1546).

== Biography ==
Giovanni Pietro de Bono was ordained a priest in the Order of Preachers. On 28 Feb 1526, he was appointed during the papacy of Pope Clement VII as Bishop of Minori. He served as Bishop of Minori until his death on 6 Jun 1546.

== See also ==
- Catholic Church in Italy

== External links and additional sources ==
- Cheney, David M. "Diocese of Minori". Catholic-Hierarchy.org. (for Chronology of Bishops) ^{[self-published]}
- Chow, Gabriel. "Titular Episcopal See of Minori (Italy)". GCatholic.org. (for Chronology of Bishops) ^{[self-published]}

Catholic Church titles
Preceded by Tommaso di Sicilia	Bishop of Minori; 1526–1546	Succeeded by Ambrogio Catarino Politi
