= Antonio Bottis =

Historical Roman figure

Most Reverend Antonio Bottis
- Bishop of Minori
- Church: Catholic Church
- Diocese: Diocese of Minori
- In office: 1670–1679
- Predecessor: Leonardo Leria
- Successor: Domenico Menna

Orders
- Consecration: 23 November 1670 by Marcello Santacroce

Personal details
- Born: 17 January 1618 Genoa, Italy
- Died: 1679 (age 60) Minori, Campania, Italy

Antonio Bottis, C.R.S. (17 January 1618 – 1679) was a Roman Catholic prelate who served as Bishop of Minori (1670–1679).

== Biography ==
Antonio Bottis was born in Genoa, Italy on 17 January 1618 and ordained a priest in the Ordo Clericorum Regularium a Somascha. On 17 November 1670, he was appointed during the papacy of Pope Clement X as Bishop of Minori. On 23 November 1670, he was consecrated bishop by Marcello Santacroce, Bishop of Tivoli, with Alessandro Crescenzi (cardinal), Bishop Emeritus of Bitonto, and Ulisse Orsini, Bishop of Ripatransone, serving as co-consecrators. He served as Bishop of Minori until his death in 1679.

== External links and additional sources ==
- Cheney, David M. "Diocese of Minori". Catholic-Hierarchy.org. (for Chronology of Bishops) ^{[self-published]}
- Chow, Gabriel. "Titular Episcopal See of Minori (Italy)". GCatholic.org. (for Chronology of Bishops) ^{[self-published]}

Catholic Church titles
Preceded by Leonardo Leria	Bishop of Minori; 1670–1679	Succeeded by Domenico Menna
