= Villa Romana, Minori =

Villa Romana di Minori
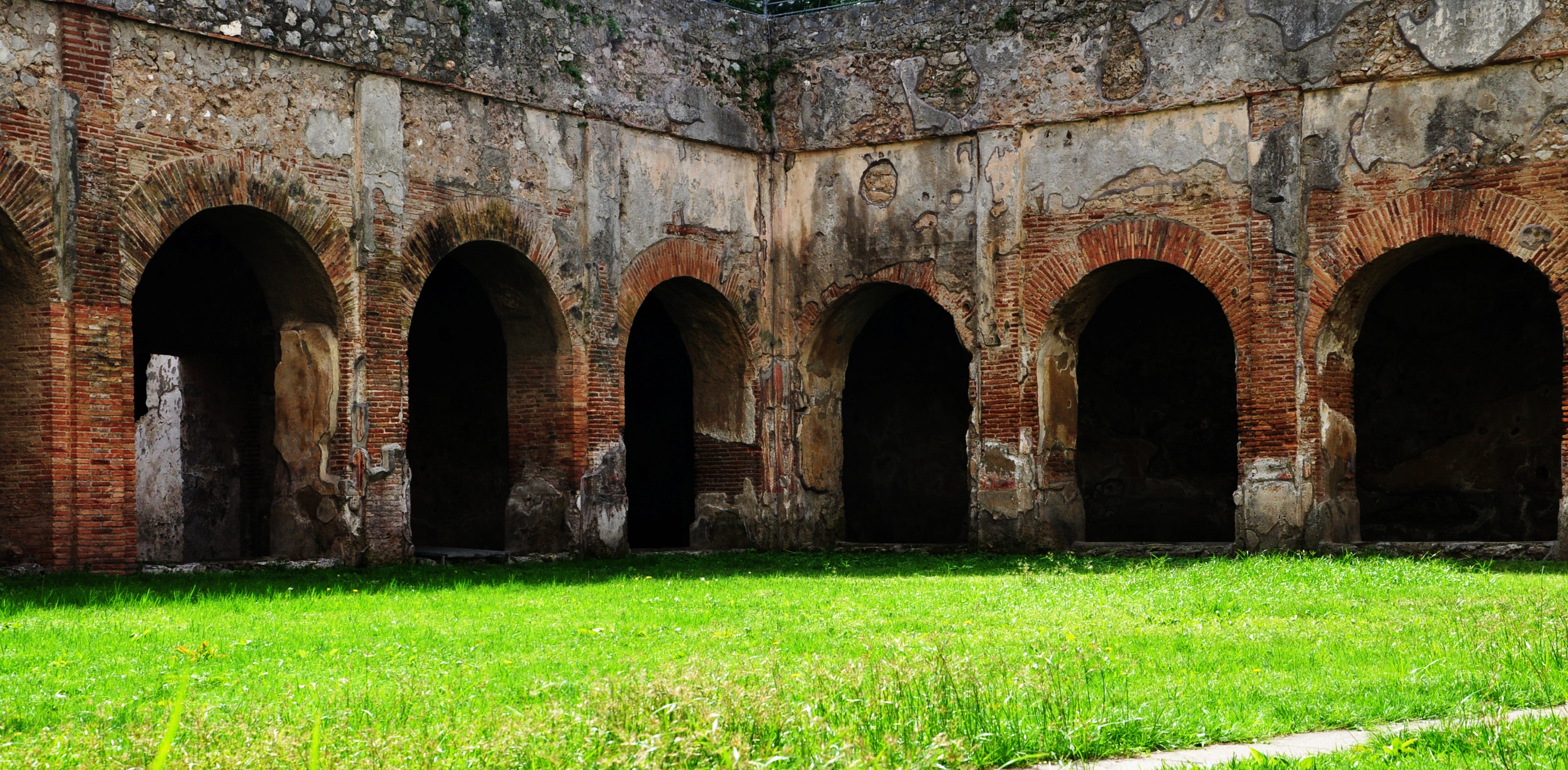
- The external garden

- Location within Italy
- 40°39′0.14″N 14°37′35.62″E
- Type: Dwelling
- Periods: Roman Imperial
- Cultures: Roman
- Location: Minori, Italy
- Region: Campania

Site notes
- Condition: Ruined
- Owner: Public
- Website: www.villaromanaminori.com

The Villa Romana or Roman Villa is an archaeological site dating from the 1st century in the Italian village of Minori, in Campania.

== Overview ==
The Villa Romana of Minori stood in a bay of the Amalfi Coast, at the point where the river, Regina Minor, empties into the sea. This stretch of coastline, full of coves and natural harbors, was a favorite place where the imperial Roman aristocracy built their residences, as evidenced by the findings of Vietri sul Mare, Amalfi, Positano, and Li Galli.

The first information on a building dating from Roman times in Minori dates from "Documents and Proceedings of the Archaeological Commission of the Hither Province Principality" (1873–74), where L. Stabiano wrote about the discovery of "Roman Baths".

In 1932, a collapse occurred during the renovation of some local homes and led to the discovery of an underground chamber, belonging to the Roman villa. The actual excavations began in 1934, but some areas came to light only in the 1950s, particularly after 1954, when a flood disrupted the Amalfi Coast.

In 1956, while working on the construction of the Hotel St. Lucia, new areas were discovered including paintings, which are preserved in the annex to the villa. The residential structure is visible only on the side closest to the sea, as many parts of the building were reused as wineries from new housing lots on the site of the villa.

In the mid-1990s, restoration began on the mosaics that decorated the triclinium.

The villa was constructed around a viridarium or Roman gardens with a central swimming pool surrounded by a group of dwelling rooms and triportico divided into two symmetric groups by a large central room.

== Gallery ==
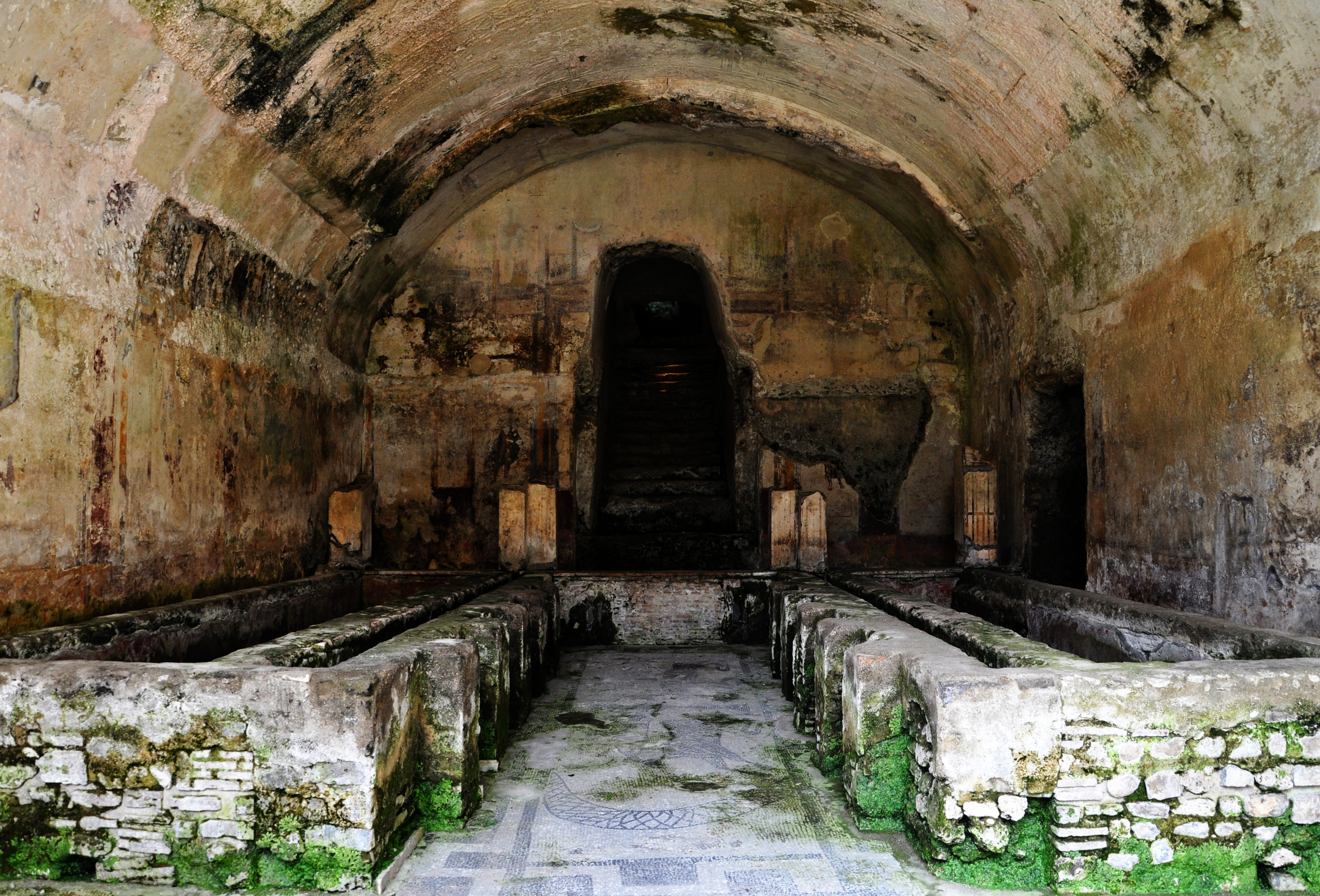
The triclinium-nymphaeum of the villa

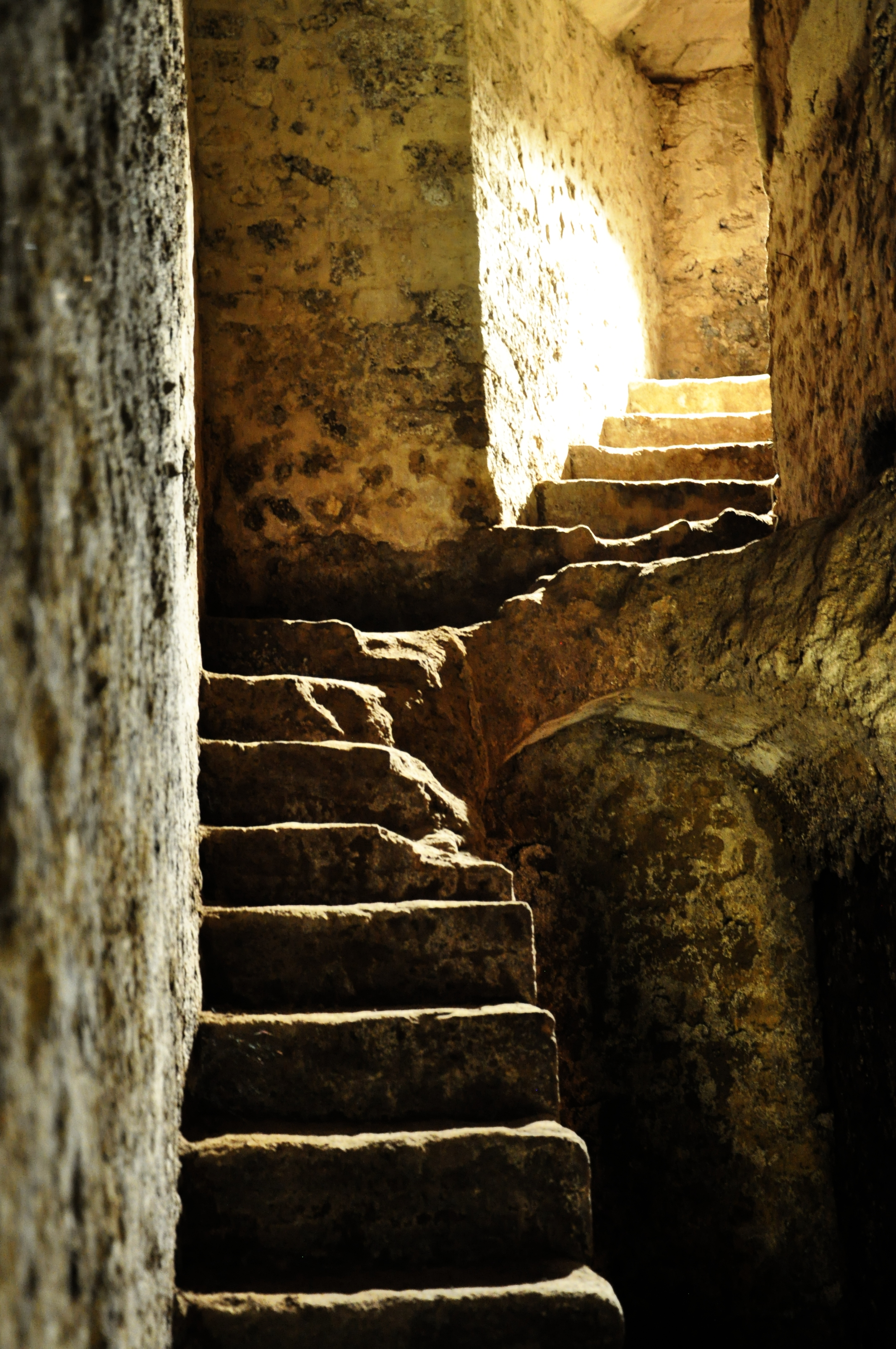
Stairs inside the villa

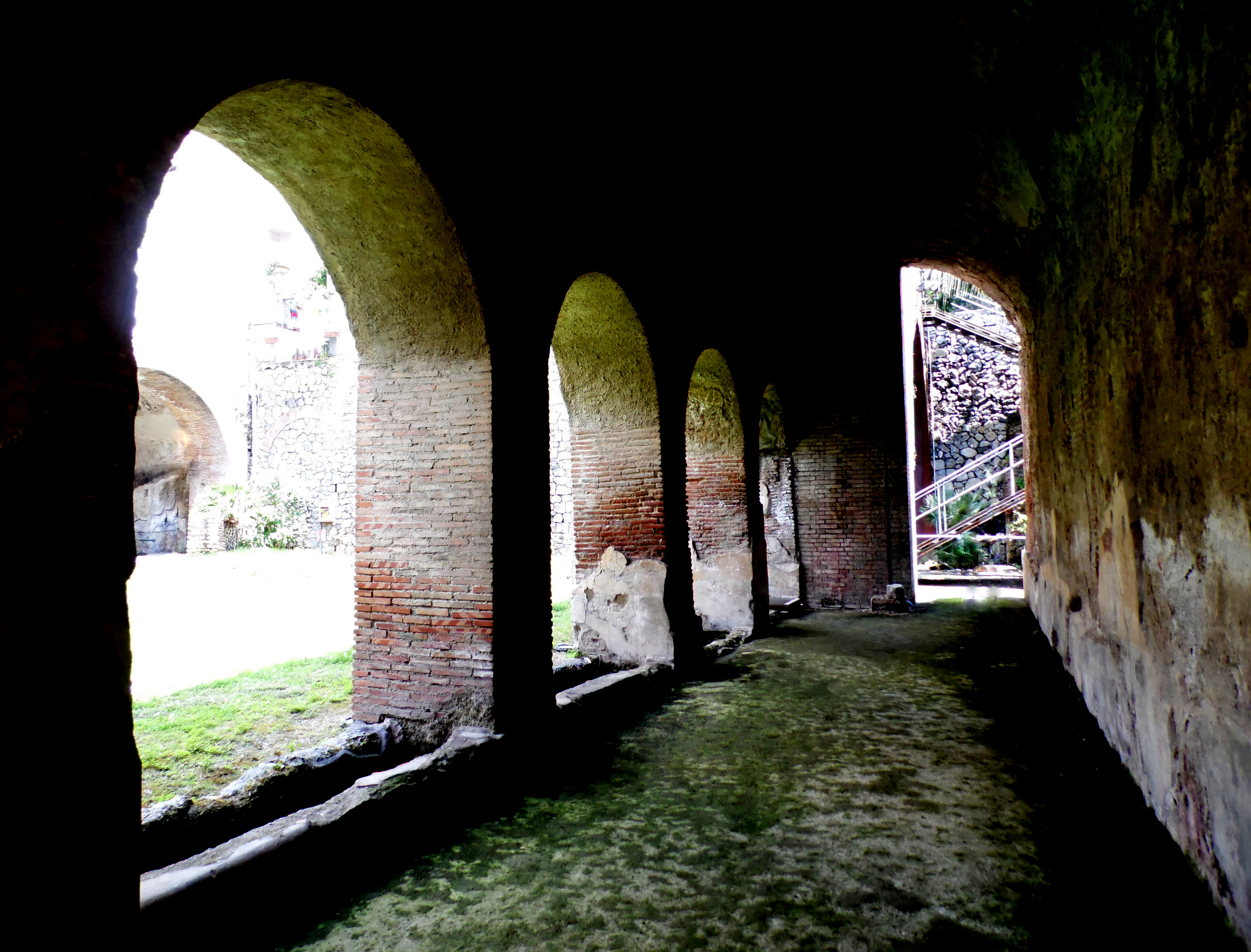
The arcades of the villa

== Bibliography ==
- A. Schiavo, The Roman villa of Minori, in "Palladio", 1939.
- A. Schiavo, The monuments of the Amalfi coast, Milan-Rome, 1941, pp. 175 ff.
- P. Mingazzini-Pfister, Italiae Form. Surrentum, Rome, 1941, pp. 147–151.
- A. Maiuri, The history of the ancient monuments of the Amalfi Coast and Sorrento in the light of the recent floods, in "Proceedings of the Academy of Archaeology, Literature and Fine Arts of Naples, XXIX, 8, 1954, pp. 87 ff.
- M. Naples, Acts dell'IX Study Conference on Magna Grecia, Taranto, 1971, Naples, 1972, pp. 391-393.
- M. Naples, Minor, in Encyclopedia of Ancient Art, V, pp. 102-103.
- C. Bencivenga, L. Ferguson, L. Melillo, Research on Roman villa in Minori, in "Annals of the Oriental Institute of Naples, Archaeology and Ancient History", 1, 1979, pp. 131 ff.
- S. De Caro, A. Greek, Campania, Bari 1981, pp. 145–148.
- M. Romito, materials Antiquarium of Minor (Part I), in "Apollo", VI, 1985–1988, pp. 119–164.
- GL Mangieri, The Roman villa of Minori: the numismatic data, in "Apollo", VI, 1985–1988, pp. 165–194.
- The Roman villas of the Imperial, 1986, pp. 78–87.
- Villa Maritime Minor triclinium-nymph. The restoration of the mosaics, Naples-Salerno, 1999.
