= Tommaso di Sicilia =

Most Reverend Tommaso di Sicilia
- Bishop of Minori
- Church: Catholic Church
- Diocese: Diocese of Minori
- In office: 1510–1526
- Predecessor: Alessandro Salati
- Successor: Giovanni Pietro de Bono

Personal details
- Died: 1 January 1526 Minori, Italy

Tommaso di Sicilia, O.P. (died 1526) was a Roman Catholic prelate who served as Bishop of Minori (1510–1526).

== Biography ==
Tommaso di Sicilia was ordained a priest in the Order of Preachers. On 30 Sep 1510, he was appointed during the papacy of Pope Julius II as Bishop of Minori. He served as Bishop of Minori until his death on 1 Jan 1526.

== External links and additional sources ==
- Cheney, David M. "Diocese of Minori". Catholic-Hierarchy.org. (for Chronology of Bishops) ^{[self-published]}
- Chow, Gabriel. "Titular Episcopal See of Minori (Italy)". GCatholic.org. (for Chronology of Bishops) ^{[self-published]}

Catholic Church titles
| Preceded by Alessandro Salati | Bishop of Minori; 1510–1526 | Succeeded by Giovanni Pietro de Bono |
