= Domenico Menna =

Italian Roman Catholic prelate

Most Reverend Domenico Menna
- Bishop of Minori
- Church: Catholic Church
- Diocese: Diocese of Minori
- Predecessor: Antonio Bottis
- Successor: Gennaro Crespino

Orders
- Ordination: 19 December 1655
- Consecration: 27 December 1683 by Alessandro Crescenzi (cardinal)

Personal details
- Born: 1632 Naples, Italy
- Died: August 1691 (age 59) Minori, Italy

Domenico Menna (1632 – August, 1691) was a Roman Catholic prelate who served as Bishop of Minori (1683–1691).

== Biography ==
Domenico Menna was born in Naples, Italy in 1632 and ordained a priest on 19 December 1655. On 20 December 1683, he was appointed during the papacy of Pope Innocent XI as Bishop of Minori. On 27 December 1683, he was consecrated bishop by Alessandro Crescenzi (cardinal), Cardinal-Priest of Santa Prisca, with Pier Antonio Capobianco, Bishop Emeritus of Lacedonia, and Costanzo Zani, Bishop of Imola, serving as co-consecrators. He served as Bishop of Minori until his death in August 1691.

== External links and additional sources ==
- Cheney, David M. "Diocese of Minori". Catholic-Hierarchy.org. (for Chronology of Bishops) ^{[self-published]}
- Chow, Gabriel. "Titular Episcopal See of Minori (Italy)". GCatholic.org. (for Chronology of Bishops) ^{[self-published]}

Catholic Church titles
Preceded by Antonio Bottis	Bishop of Minori; 1683–1691	Succeeded by Gennaro Crespino
