= João Alves =

João Alves may refer to:

- João Alves (bishop) (1925–2013), Portuguese Catholic bishop
- João Alves Filho (1941–2020), Brazilian politician
- João Alves (footballer, born 1952), known as "Luvas Pretas" (black gloves), Portuguese footballer who played as a midfielder
- João Alves (footballer, born 1980), Portuguese footballer who played as a midfielder
