= Matteo D'Afflitto =

Italian jurist (died 1523)

Matteo D'Afflitto (c. 1447 – 1523), also referred to as Matthaeus de Afflictis, was a Neapolitan jurist descending from the princely family d’Afflitto.

The son of a nobleman, he studied the Humaniora and law at the University of Naples, where he became doctor of canon and Roman law in 1468. Without holding a chair, he taught Roman and feudal law at Naples and also practiced law as an advocate and jurisconsult. From 1490 onwards, he held judicial posts at the Camera Summaria and the Cura Vicaria, and was also a member of the Royal Council of Naples from 1495 to 1501.

Like most Neapolitan jurists of the time, D'Afflitto focused exclusively on feudal law and on ius patrium, the indigenous Neapolitan law. He was among the last adherents to an influential school of Neapolitan jurists that had provided Europe with volumes of scholarship on feudal law ever since the 13th century. His principal works include Tractatus celeberrimus de iure protomiseos sive di iure congrui (1496), the feudal law commentary Commentaria super primo (-tertio) feudorum libro (1543/47), the 404 Decisiones S.R. Consilii Neapolitani (1509 et seq.) and the commentary on royal legislation Singularis lectura super omnibus sacris constitutionibus Regnorum utriusque Siciliae citra et ultra (1517 et seq.).

== Works ==
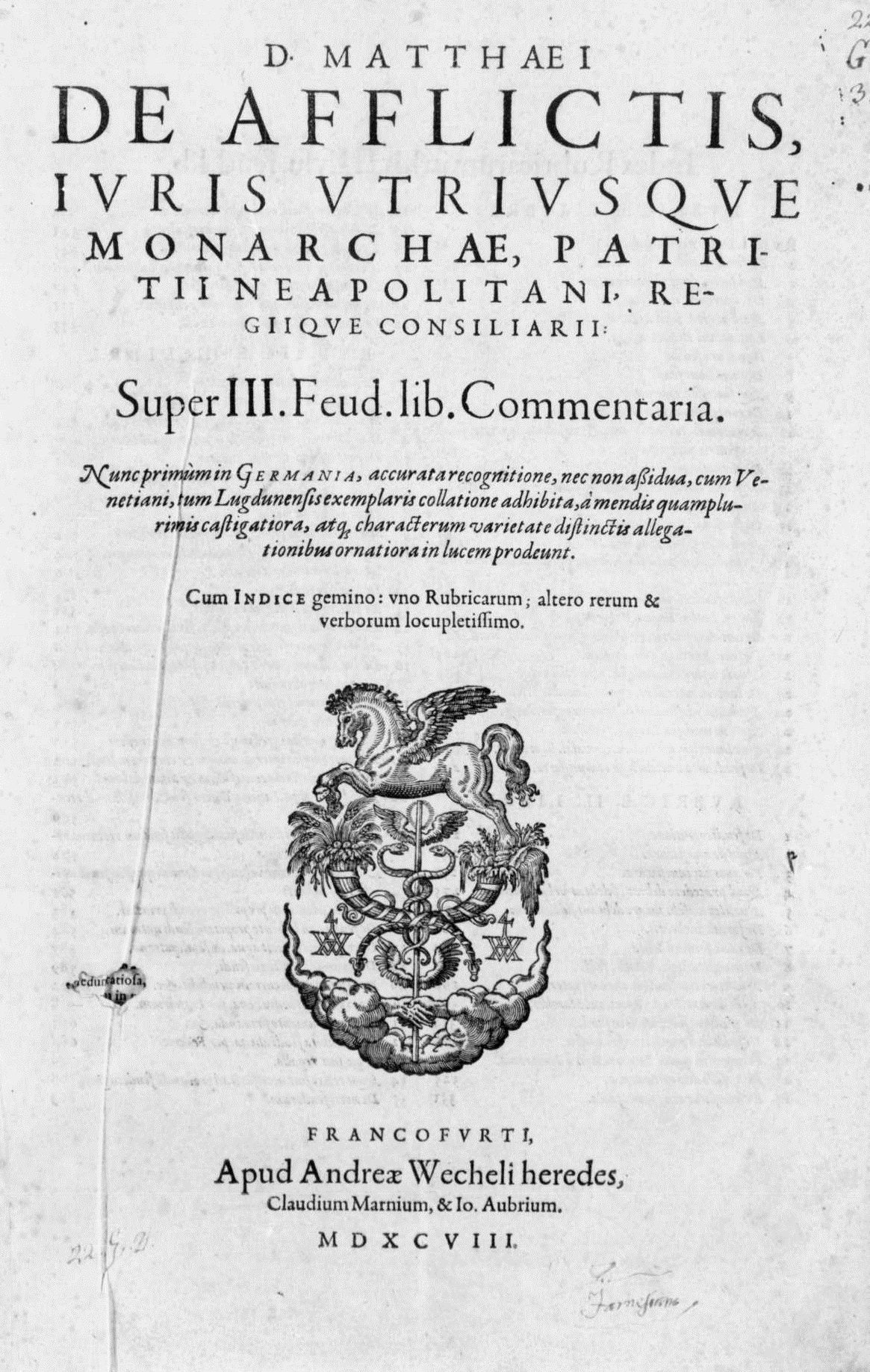
Commentaria in Libri feudorum, 1598 edition

- Commentarius super tres libros feudorum, Venice, 1534 3n folio.
  - Commentaria in Libri feudorum (in Latin). Frankfurt am Main: Andreas Wechel, Erben & Claude Marne & Johann Aubry. 1598.
- De consiliaris principium,..
- Decisiorum sacri regii Neapolitani,.., Francofurti: I. Feyrabendium, 1600 (Naples - Sicily)
- Iuris vtriusque monarchae,..., Francofurti: A. Wecheli, 1598 (feudal laws).
- Lecture super 7 codicis Justiniani, 1560 (Codex Justinianeus).
- Tractatus de jure protomiseos,..., Naples: V. Manfredii, 1777, 2 vols (right of first refusal).
