= Giovanni D'Amato =

Roman Catholic prelate

Most Reverend Giovanni D'Amato
- Bishop of Minori
- Church: Catholic Church
- Diocese: Diocese of Minori
- In office: 1565–1567
- Predecessor: Alessandro Mollo
- Successor: Giovanni Agostino Campanile

Orders
- Consecration: 21 October 1565 by Giovanni Antonio Serbelloni

Giovanni D'Amato was a Roman Catholic prelate who served as Bishop of Minori (1565–1567).

== Biography ==
On 12 October 1565, Giovanni D'Amato was appointed during the papacy of Pope Pius IV as Bishop of Minori. On 21 October 1565, he was consecrated bishop by Giovanni Antonio Serbelloni, Bishop of Novara, with Antonio Elio, Titular Patriarch of Jerusalem, and Ascanio Albertini, Bishop of Avellino e Frigento, serving as co-consecrators. He served as Bishop of Minori until his resignation in 1567.

== Episcopal succession ==
While bishop, he was the principal co-consecrator of:

- Felice Peretti Montalto, Bishop of Sant'Agata de' Goti (1567);
- Gaspare Visconti, Archbishop of Milan (1584);
- Francesco Liparuli, (Liparolo), Bishop of Capri (1584);
- Cesare Speciano, (Speciani), Bishop of Novara (1584); and
- Fulvio Passerini, Bishop of Avellino e Frigento (1591).

== External links and additional sources ==
- Cheney, David M. "Diocese of Minori". Catholic-Hierarchy.org. (for Chronology of Bishops) ^{[self-published]}
- Chow, Gabriel. "Titular Episcopal See of Minori (Italy)". GCatholic.org. (for Chronology of Bishops) ^{[self-published]}

Catholic Church titles
Preceded by Alessandro Mollo	Bishop of Minori; 1565–1567	Succeeded by Giovanni Agostino Campanile
