= Gennaro Maria D'Afflitto =

Italian military engineer

Gennaro Maria D'Afflitto OP
- Born: 1618; Naples, Kingdom of Naples
- Died: 1673 (aged 55); Naples, Kingdom of Naples
- Family: d'Afflitto
- Scientific career
- Fields: Mathematics, military engineering, artillery
- Workplaces: Real Academia de Matemáticas, Artillería y Fortificación
- Patrons: John Joseph of Austria

Gennaro Maria D'Afflitto OP (1618 – 1673) was an Italian Dominican friar and military engineer who worked under Philip IV and Charles II of Spain.

== Biography ==
=== Early life and education ===
Little is known about D'Afflitto's early life. He was born into a noble family in Naples in 1618. On 16 September 1633, he entered the Dominican convent of Santa Maria della Sanità, Naples, where he received a good scientific and humanistic education, and developed a keen interest in mathematics.

=== Career ===
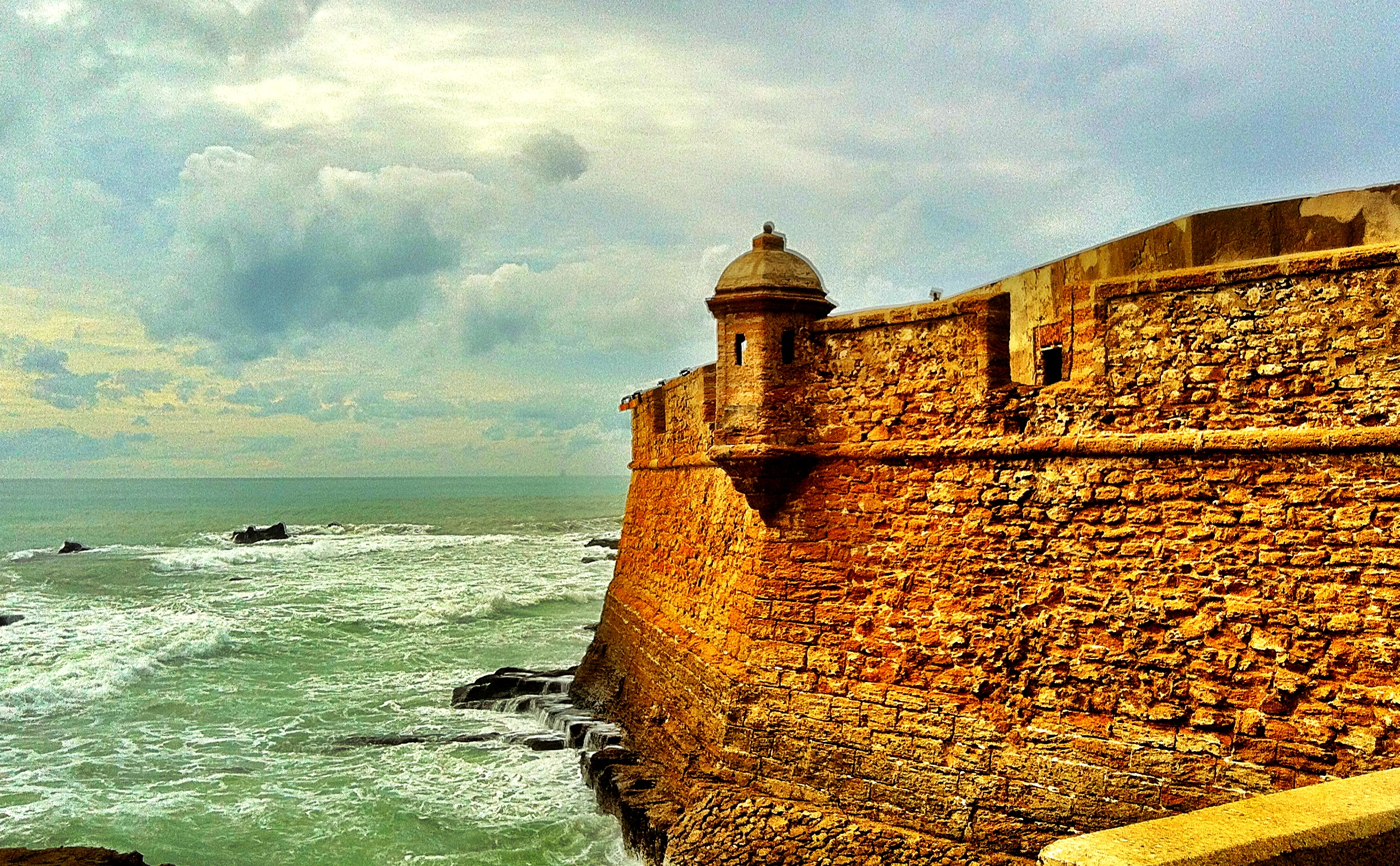
The fort of Santa Caterina in Cádiz

In 1647 D'Afflitto met Philip IV's natural son John Joseph of Austria, who had been sent to Naples to quell the rebellion of Masaniello. He followed him in the campaign to recapture Orbetello and Porto Longone (1650) and later served as military engineer in the Spanish Army in Catalonia, Portugal and the Southern Netherlands. He also worked at the fort of Peñíscola in Valencia, the fort of Santa Caterina in Cádiz, and the fort of Sanlúcar de Barrameda on the Guadalquivir. In 1663 the Supreme Council of War appointed him as professor of mathematics in the Real Academia de Matemáticas, Artillería y Fortificación of Madrid. He was in charge of the chair until 1665.

=== Later life ===
Following the fall from grace of Don Juan Joseph, D'Afflitto entered the service of Ferdinando II de' Medici as a teacher of mathematics and military engineer. He did not remain in Florence for long: in 1667 he was in Rome (as deduced from a letter to Antonio Magliabechi), and at the end of 1667 he became an advisor to the Republic of Genoa on engineering matters. On behalf of the Republic D'Afflitto inspected the walls of Savona and concurred with Guerrini in fortifying Vado Ligure. D'Afflitto is also credited with fortification works in Cuneo and Nizza Marittima on behalf of the House of Savoy. Finally returning to Naples, he died in the convent of Santa Maria della Sanità in 1673.

== Works ==
D'Afflitto published at Madrid a treatise on fortifications in two volumes, De Munitione et Fortificatione, Libri duo. The first volume is dedicated to Don John Joseph of Austria. Abstracts of this work were published at Florence in 1665, by Captain Giovanni Battista Sergiuliani, and in 1667 by Filippo Domenico Mazzenghi. Likewise, he is the author of Compendio de modernas fortificaciones (Compendium of Modern Fortifications), translated into Spanish in 1657 by Baltasar Siscara. D'Afflitto wrote also a treatise on fire and explosive weapons, De igne et ignivomis (Zaragoza, 1661). The work is divided into two parts: the first deals with the nature of fire and the different kinds of fuels; the second describes various types of explosives. He left in manuscript Terra seu quadripartites orbis, Compendio della Sfera universale, and a number of poems and miscellaneous tracts on philosophical and theological topics. Jonas Moore considered D'Afflitto, together with Francesco Tensini and Pietro Sardi, one of Italy's foremost experts on fortification.

== Published works ==
- De igne et ignivomis. Zaragoza: Diego Dormer. 1661.
- De munitione et fortificatione (Matriti s. d.)
- Breve trattato delle moderne fortificazioni. Florence: all'insegna della Stella. 1665.
- Introduzione alla moderna fortificazione. Florence: nella stamp. di s.a.s. per il Vangelisti, e Matini. 1667.

== Bibliography ==
- Toppi, Niccolò (1678). Biblioteca napoletana, et apparato a gli huomini illustri in lettere di Napoli. Naples: Antonio Bulifon. p. 105.
- Addizioni copiose di Lionardo Nicodemo alla Biblioteca napoletana del dottor Niccolò Toppi. Naples: per Salvator Castaldo regio stamp.: a spese di Giacomo Raillard. 1683. p. 85.
- Quétif, Jacques; Échard, Jacques (1721). Scriptores Ordinis Praedicatorum. Vol. 2. Paris: apud J-B-C. Ballard, et N. Simart. p. 646.
- Napoli Signorelli, Pietro (1811). Vicende della Coltura nelle Due Sicilie. Vol. 5. Naples. pp. 340–1.
- Signorelli, Bruno (1985). "D'AFFLITTO, Gennaro Maria". Dizionario Biografico degli Italiani (in Italian). Vol. 31: Cristaldi–Dalla Nave. Rome: Istituto dell'Enciclopedia Italiana. ISBN 978-88-12-00032-6.
- Albornoz y Galbeño, Juan Carrillo de. "Genaro María Aflitto". Diccionario biográfico español. Madrid: Real Academia de la Historia.
- Gatto, Romano (1994). Tra scienza e immaginazione: le matematiche presso il collegio gesuitico napoletano (1552-1670 ca.). Florence: Leo S. Olschki. pp. 156–7. ISBN 978-8822242280.
- Espino López, Antonio (2001). Guerra y cultura en la Época Moderna. La tratadística militar hispánica de los siglos XVI y XVII. Autores, libros y lectores. Madrid: Ministerio de Defensa. ISBN 84-78-23860-3.
