= Sixtus of Siena =

Roman Catholic theologian (1520–1569)

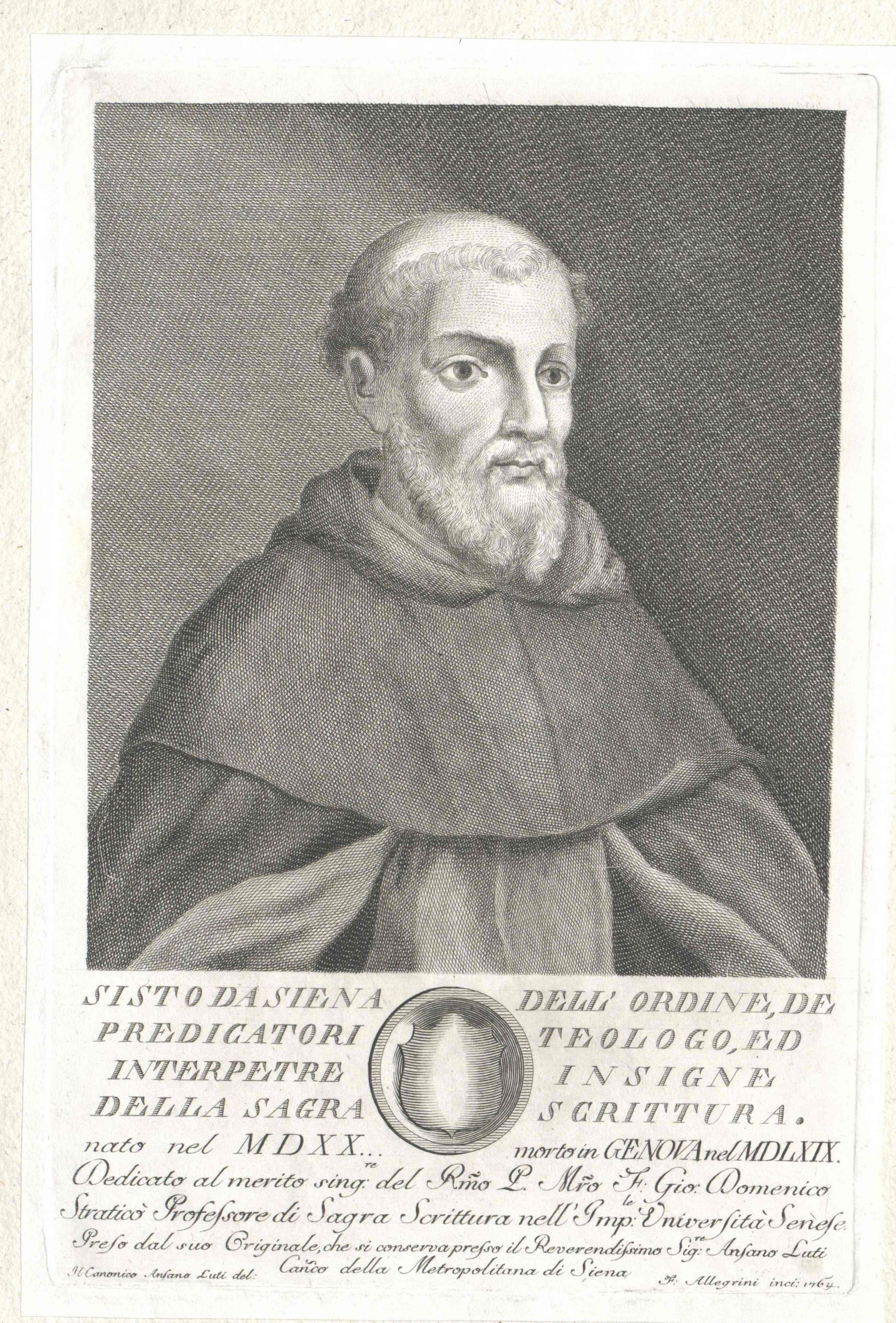

Sixtus of Siena (or Sixtus Senensis) (1520–1569) was a Jew who converted to Catholicism, and became a Catholic theologian.

== Biography ==
He began his career as a Franciscan preacher, speaking throughout Italy. Though he was convicted to die in Rome for the crime of heresy or recidivism, he was saved by a Dominican inquisitor, the future Pope Pius V, who repealed the condemnation when Sixtus recanted and pledged to transfer to the Dominican Order instead. He is considered one of the two most outstanding Dominican scholars of his generation. He had as a master Lancelotto Politi, some of whose writings he later publicly criticised. Sixtus apparently destroyed all his remaining manuscripts and writings before his death.

Sixtus coined the term deuterocanonical to describe certain books of the Catholic Old Testament that had not been accepted as canonical by Jews and Protestants but which appeared in the Septuagint, and the definer for the Roman Catholics of the terms protocanonical and the ancient term apocryphal.

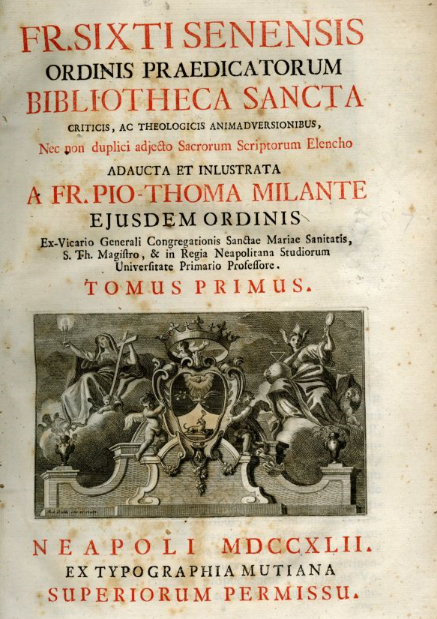
Title page Bibliotheca Sancta Ed.1742

His work Bibliotheca sancta ex præcipuis Catholicæ Ecclesiæ auctoribus collecta (Venice 1566) treats the sacred writers and their works, the best manner of translating and explaining Holy Writ, and gives a copious list of Biblical interpreters, in eight books. It was the first of the genre of encyclopedic teaching repertories of dogma and Church tradition issued in the wake of the Council of Trent.
