= D'Afflitto family =

Italian princely family

House d'Afflitto
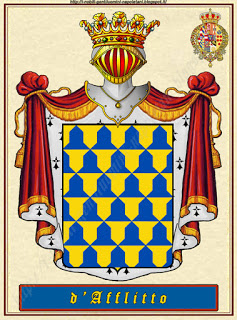
- Parent family: Saint Eustace
- Earlier spellings: 'de Flicto'
- Origin: Duchy of Amalfi
- Founded: 9th century
- Founder: Leone, Duke of Amalfi
- Current head: Marquis Cosimo d'Afflitto (Amalfi line)
- Titles: Prince; Duke; Marquis; Count; Baron; Lord; Patrician of Naples; Patrician of Amalfi; Patrician of Scala; Grand Master of the Templars; Viceroi of Basilicata; Viceroi of Napoli; Viceroi of Abruzzi

The d'Afflitto family is an ancient princely family originally from Amalfi, documented since the 9th century, and spread throughout southern Italy.

The mythical origins date back to the Roman general Placidus, who lived at the time of Trajan (2nd century) and later became Saint Eustace, but the family is historically documented from the 9th century, when Leone d'Afflitto was appointed Duke of Amalfi.

The family fiefdoms were scattered throughout Southern Italy: Sicily, Apulia, Calabria, Basilicata and the Abruzzi. There are records of 5 principalities, 5 dukedoms, 5 marquisates, 6 earldoms, 49 baronies, in addition to the current title of Marquis (male-line primogeniture), Patrician of Amalfi (male-line).

Alongside the nobles of Scala, Amalfi and Naples, the family expressed royal officials for the Angevin, Bourbon, Habsburg and Savoy dynasties, as well as jurists, clericals and military commanders.

The d'Afflitto family is regarded as one of the founding families of the Order of Malta, with Landolfo and his son Jacopo travelling and fighting alongside Blessed Gerard in the Crusades in the Holy Land. Father and son are mentioned in Torquato Tasso's Jerusalem Conquered. Don Camponello, Lord of Rodegaldo, was instead Grand Master of the Knights Templar in 1235.

The family is related to multiple aristocratic families of the Kingdom of the Two Sicilies, Southern Italy, and Northern Italy.

== The origins: from Castrum Pini to Scala (11th and 12th century) ==
Genealogists have considered that the different forms of the surname d'Afflitto, that is d'Africto, de Fricto, de Flicto, de Afflicto, de Afflictis, and their variants, are attributable to the same family.

With regard to the original form de or da Filicto, in particular, it has been more recently proposed to be derived from the term afflictus, as a variant of affictus, with the meaning of tax or income.

One of the first documentary evidence of the family dates back to March 7, 1041. They instead arrived in Scala in the Norman age (1131–1194); the family became domini, that is, members of the town's aristocracy.

Some bishops from the same city, established as diocese around 1069, also belonged to the family: Orso (ca. 1144), Alessandro II (1171–1191 ca.), Costantino (1207–1220 ca.), Matteo (1227–1269 ca). Later there were Natale Mastini d’Afflitto (1418–1450) and Francesco (1583–1593).

In 1280–1282, the d'Afflitto were several times judges of Scala.

In 1144, Bishop Orso donated to the church of St. Stephanie in the same town two silver deer bearing the insignia of the d'Afflitto. The gift would suggest the spread at this time of the tradition about the family's lineage from St. Eustace, a Roman general under Emperor Trajan. An episode in the legend of the Saint is centred on a deer that, during a hunting trip, would have appeared to the Roman general Placidus, who then went down in history as Saint Eustace, carrying the Cross and the figure of Christ between his horns.

From the wills of the members, it emerges, between the XI and XII centuries, the existence of a conspicuous estate comprising palaces and properties in Benevento, as well as properties in Scala and throughout the Duchy of Amalfi.

== The family spreads to southern Italy ==
The family moved to Amalfi in the 12th century. In 1157, therefore, Pietro lived at Capo di Croce, while in 1181, Judge Riccardo lived in a Domus located near the cathedral, which still preserves the family tombs.

The presence of the family in Monopoli is documented in 1187, while in Ravello it is attested in 1195. The d'Afflitto from Scala also had marital relations with the most important families of Ravello. In this city, the d'Afflitto family built several palaces, the first in front of the church of Saints John the Baptist and Evangelist. Palazzo d'Afflitto in Ravello houses a renowned hotel. Villa Rufolo was also owned by the family for a short period during the Middle Ages.

They probably came to Naples in the early Swabian age. In the year 1245, under the reign of Emperor Frederick II, Enrico di Scala and his son Federico, probably from Ravello, were among the nobles of the Seat of Nido.

Especially in the Angevin era, in fact, merchants, but also crown officials, belonging to the families of Amalfi, were ennobled and admitted into the ranks of the chivalry.

This branch of the family, settled in Naples, became extinct in the mid-15th century. The d'Afflitto enjoyed nobility in Naples also in the Seats of Porto and Portanova, but their merchant activity is also well documented.

From Antonio, Regent of the Vicariate Curia at the beginning of the 15th century, descended Michele, Treasurer of the Kingdom of Naples (1485–1499), in 1496 feudal lord in Gaeta and Abruzzi, Lieutenant of the Sommaria (from 1504 onwards), Grand Chamberlain and first Count of Trivento in 1505. Girolamo (1617–1662), Duke of Barrea, Count of Trivento and Prince of Scanno from 1646.

The members of the family, in the XV and XVI centuries, were engaged in public office, ecclesiastical career and military service, while continuing to carry out mercantile, banking and insurance activities for a long time.

The Family also settled in Tropea, Brindisi and Cosenza.

== Main family branches ==
The family split into several branches, in particular:

1. Branch of the Counts of Trivento, then Dukes of Barrea and Princes of Scanno, ascribed in Naples to the Seat of Porto, extinct in the Caracciolo di Melissano;
2. Branch of the Counts of Loreto, extinct into the previous branch;
3. Branch of the Princes of Belmonte, descended from the aforementioned Bartolomeo (died 1240) in Sicily and extinct into the Ventimiglia family;
4. Branch of the Barons of Monteroduni and Macchia, also extinct into the Imperiali family;
5. Branch of the Dukes of Campomele and Castropignano, Marquises of Frignano Maggiore, Montefalcone and Agropoli, extinct into the Nunziante family.

== Key family figures ==
=== Condottieri ===
- Camponello, Lord of Rodegaldo, Redine and Molpa, Grand Master of the Knights Templar in 1235, depicted dressed in the Order's attire in the Cathedral of Scala.
- Antonio (late 14th century), Patrician of Scala and Naples; he was regent of the Grand Court of the Vicariate, knight on the Angevin side, during the conflict between the Angevins and the Durazzos he directed military operations in the dukedom of Amalfi. King Ladislaus I of Naples confiscated his property and exiled him; he founded the branch that was later awarded the earldom of Trivento.
- Giovanni Battista (died 1556) fought for the Spanish King in Tunis in 1535 and Siena in 1554, Captain for Charles V, Governor of Arms in Terra d'Otranto, Viceroy of Principality, Viceroy of Abruzzo and Captain in those provinces, Governor of Veroli, Tivoli and Vicovaro in Roman Campagna, Viceroy of Basilicata.
- Giovanni Girolamo (died 1591), Count of Trivento and Duke of Castel di Sangro, he married Cornelia Lannoy, daughter of don Giorgio, Duke of Boiano and great-granddaughter of Jeanne de Croÿ, was a valiant leader in Flanders.
- Giorgio (died 1633), Count of Trivento and Duke of Castel di Sangro, (son of the former) was a valiant condottiero. Repeatedly mentioned in Torquato Tasso's Jerusalem Conquered as the fourth duke following Richard in Palestine, with a clear reference to the martyrdom of St. Eustace.

…il quarto Afflitto,

Del cui maggior la fama ancor non langue,

Che ne’ tormenti fu per Cristo esangue.

(chapter XVIII, verses 135-137)

- Scipione (died 1649), who distinguished himself at the Battle of Riva di Chiavenna in 1625.
- Matteo, graduated major of the Bourbon army, he was appointed Knight of Merit of the Royal Military Order of Saint George of the Reunion (1819).
- Francesco, Marquis and Patrician of Amalfi, General in Command of the Carabinieri, Grand Cross of the Order of the Crown of Italy, Grand Cross of Knight of the Order of Saints Maurice and Lazarus, Venerable Bailiff and Chancellor and Grand Prior of the Order for the Two Sicilies since 1926. In 1931 he was one of the 3 venerable Bailiffs who took part in the conclave for election as Grand Master, together with Prince Chigi Alabani della Rovere and Pio Franchi de' Cavalieri. He was not elected, so he immediately resigned from the Order and renounced all offices and privileges.

=== Royal officials and public administrators ===
- Pandolfo (14th century) was the founder of the Sicilian princely branch, he settled in Palermo at the service of King James II of Aragon.
- Francesco, son of the former, was Senator and Praetor of Palermo (1329).
- Pietro il Vecchio (died 1439), Lord of Belmonte, gave origin to the branch of the Princes of Belmonte (1627); he bought the palace of the Great Hospice in Palermo.
- Leonardo (died 1416), President of the Grand Vicariate Court of Naples (1369), professor of civil law (ca. 1380), Lieutenant of the Grand Camerlengo (1390), vicar general of the Kingdom (1408/1414); favourite of King Ladislaus of Anjou-Durazzo.
- Nicola (15th century), appointed by King Alfonso V of Aragon as finance administrator the Prince of Salerno. He was also the personal adviser of Ferdinand I.
- Raffaele (15th century), was a personal advisor to Eleaonor of Aragon, Princess of Salerno.
- Matteo, jurist, was born in Naples in the mid-15th century. He was a law lecturer for twenty years in the Neapolitan Studio, although he never held the chair of the university. His career in the offices of the Kingdom depended on his close relationship with Alfonso of Aragon. After 1488 he was appointed by King Ferrante as judge of the Vicariate and President of the Sommaria. In July 1495 he was rewarded with a promotion to the Royal Council, a position he held until 1506. He wrote several works, including: Commentaria super tribus libris feudorum, Tractatus de iure prothomiseos sive de iure congrui; Decisiones Sacri Regii Consilii Neapolitani, distributed throughout Europe, had about 40 editions from 1499 onwards; In utriusque Siciliae Neapolisque Sanctiones et Constitutiones novissima Praelectio (1517); Annotationes ad Consuetudines Neapolitanas.
- Michele (died 1521), was created Count of Trivento in 1505; Treasurer of the Kingdom of Naples (1488), Regent of the Grand Chamber and Lieutenant of the Royal Chamber (1503); having requested the King of Aragon to call the General Parliament on 12 March 1511, he was appointed to preside over it in Naples.
- Federico, (17th century) Neapolitan Patrician, Knight of the Order of Santiago, he served in Flanders in the Spanish army, War Counsellor to Albert VII, Archduke of Austria.
- Michele II (died 1620) Duke of Barrea and Count of Trivento due to his brother Giorgio's refutation, he renewed the family fideicommissum on Trivento in 1613, Neapolitan Patrician; Viceroy and Governor-General of the arms of the Kingdom of Naples, Governor of Chieti (died in office). He married Donna Francesca Albrizzi, daughter of Don Giovanni Antonio II, Prince of Avetrana and Donna Giulia Farnese, Duchess of Latera. With his wife's dowry, Michele bought the princely feud of Scanno.
- Giovanni Battista (died 1688), Governor of Afragola, Cava (1645), Foggia (1647), Lucera (1648), Lecce (1654–1657), Catanzaro (1658), civil then ordinary judge in Naples (1661–1662).
- Rodolfo, Duke of Castropignano and Duke Campomele, Marquis of Frignano Maggiore and Marquis of Agropoli. After Garibaldi entered Naples, he was Prefect first in Genoa, then in Naples (1863, 1869), Senator of the Kingdom of Italy (20 January 1861), vice-president of the Senate (1867 to 1871). By Royal Concession, he had the right of residence in the royal palace of Capodimonte. He died on 26 July 1872 in Naples.

=== Influential clericals ===
- Annibale (1560–1638), Archbishop. After obtaining his degree in Bologna, he moved to Madrid in 1568 where he was at the court of Philip IV as chaplain to the young princesses of the Spanish court. The monarch proposed his nomination as Archbishop of Reggio Calabria to Clement VIII, which took place on 15 November 1593. Having arrived in his seat, he was a strict controller of religious life and applied the provisions of the Counter-Reformation; he had the hospital, the seminary and many of the churches destroyed by the Turks of Sinan Bassà in 1594 rebuilt.
- Giovanni Battista (17th century), Abbot and Vicar-General of the diocese of Minori, erudite scholar versed in the reading of the Amalfitan Curialesca writing, correspondent of the Cistercian abbot Ferdinando Ughelli (1595–1670); he was the author of Breve racconto della vita, martirio, e miracoli della gloriosa Verg. e Mart. S. Trofimena (1660).
- Cesare (1615–1682), a lawyer, joined the Theatine Order in 1657 under the name of Gaetano Andrea. He was Bishop of Cava (1670) and author of some legal treaties: Juris responsum de actionibus (1649); Controversi juris resolutiones (1660–1661).

=== Prominent scholars and scientists ===
- Gennaro Maria, was born in Naples in 1618. In 1633 he was admitted in the Dominican convent of Santa Maria della Sanità, where he took his vows in 1634. He was a military engineer with the Spanish army and teacher of mathematics. He met his protector in Naples, the natural son of Philip IV, Don John Joseph of Austria (1647–1648), who he followed to Madrid, where the Supreme Council of War appointed him as professor of mathematics at the Royal Palace, and then in the countryside of Orbetello and Porto Longone (1650). He then came under the service of Ferdinando II of Tuscany again as a teacher of mathematics and military engineer. He was in Rome at the end of 1667 and then in Genoa, where he gave his opinion on the defence works of the roadstead of Vado Ligure. It was finally in Savona in 1669. He is credited with fortification works in Cuneo and Nizza Marittima on behalf of the House of Savoy. He died in Naples in 1673. Works: Muniendarum urbium, methodus modernus; De igne et ignivomis (1661).
- Eustachio, was born in Roccagloriosa on 29 July 1742. In 1748 he entered the college of nobles in Naples, run by the Jesuits; in 1758 he became a cleric and was elected chaplain of the Treasure of St. Gennaro by the nobles of the Nilo seat, to which the family was aggregated. On 26 September 1761, he entered the Dominican Order and studied theology in Rome and Perugia. After returning to Naples, he taught philosophy. In 1773 he was awarded the chair of the history of religion and was invited to teach at the new University of Malta. In 1778 he joined the Royal Academy of Sciences and Letters, and the following year he was appointed vice-librarian and coadjutor for the arrangement of the Farnese Library. In 1782 he finished the first volume of the work Memorie degli scrittori del Regno di Napoli, and was appointed custodian of the museum of Capodimonte. On 14 July 1784 he took over the administration of the library, but on 8 December 1787, he died having printed only half of the second volume, published posthumously in 1794.

== The last descendants ==
The last four lines of the family are these:

1. the d’Afflitto of Aragon, Patricians of Naples. Descendants of Antonio (1772–1850), who married the noble Camilla of Aragon (1769–1810), extinct;
2. the Scala Line, Patricians of Scala, whose main offshoot died out with Maria Stefania, Duchess of Campomele, Duchess of Castropignano, Marchioness of Montefalcone, Marchioness of Frignano Maggiore, Marchioness of Agropoli (died 1914), who married Marquis Riccardo Nunziante of San Ferdinando in 1876; the second-born offshoot of don Bonaventura, Marquis d'Afflitto dei Principi di Scanno, son of Matteo, patrician of Scala (1833–1904) also died out. The painter Tamara de Łempicka made two famous portraits (1925, 1926) of The Marquis don Bonaventura d'Afflitto.
3. the Ravello Line, Patricians of Ravello, descendants of Diego, born in 1797, extinct;
4. the Amalfi Line, Patricians of Amalfi (male, 1915), Marquis (male-line primogeniture, D.R. 16 February 1922), to which belonged don Camillo I (1818–1899), son of don Raffaele and Carolina Lanzetta Sforza, from which don Francesco (1861–1934) descended, married to the Marquis Bartolommei, from which don Camillo II (1890–1949), from which don Francesco II (1921–1996), from which don Camillo III (1951–2008). The current head of the family is Marquis Cosimo (1996). The renown enologist nobile Nicolo dei Marchesi d'Afflitto from Castel Ruggero is Chief Enologist at one of the top Italian wine-makers Marchesi de Frescobaldi.

== Feudal titles ==
These are some of the family's feudal titles:

Principalities: Belmonte 1627, Durazzano, Roccagloriosa, Scanno 1647, Villa dorata.

Dukedoms: Barrea, Bernauda, Casteldisangro, Castropignano, Campomele.

Marquisates: Frignano Maggiore, Lauria, Montefalcone.

Earlsdoms: Civitasantangelo, Lizzanello, Loreto, Nicotera, Trivento, Ventimiglia.

Baronies: Acqua della Vena, Angri, Borrello, Brittoli, Cancellara, Carpineto, Cardito, Casella, Casalpiscopo, Castignano, Castiglione, Civitella, Collare, Ferrazzano, Gratteri, Larderia, Macchia, Molpa, Monteroduno, Mosellara, Muro, Nocciano, Ortona, Papasidero, Pesco, Petranico, Petruro, Pettorano, Pietrapulcina, Pietrarosella, Pizzoferrato, Redine, Roccasassone, Rocchetta, Roccapimonte, Roccaimperiale, Roccamainolfi, Rodegaldo, Rufo, Santangelo in Grisone, Santagapito, San Martino, Sinagra, Somma, Tocco, Torre dei passeri, Valenzano, Villetta.

== Historical buildings ==
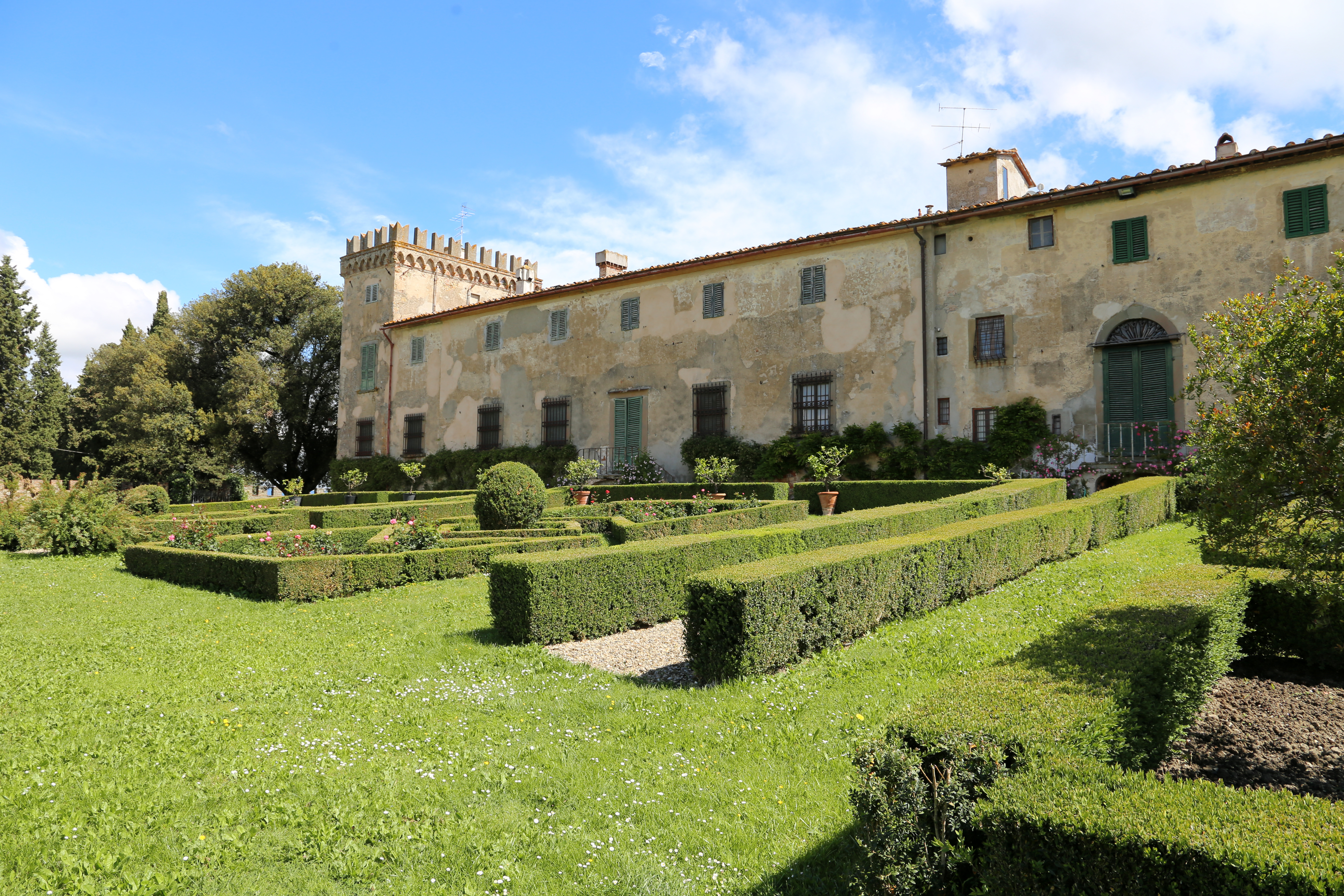
Castel Ruggero in Florence. Residence of Nobile Nicolò dei Marchesi d'Afflitto, Patrician of Amalfi

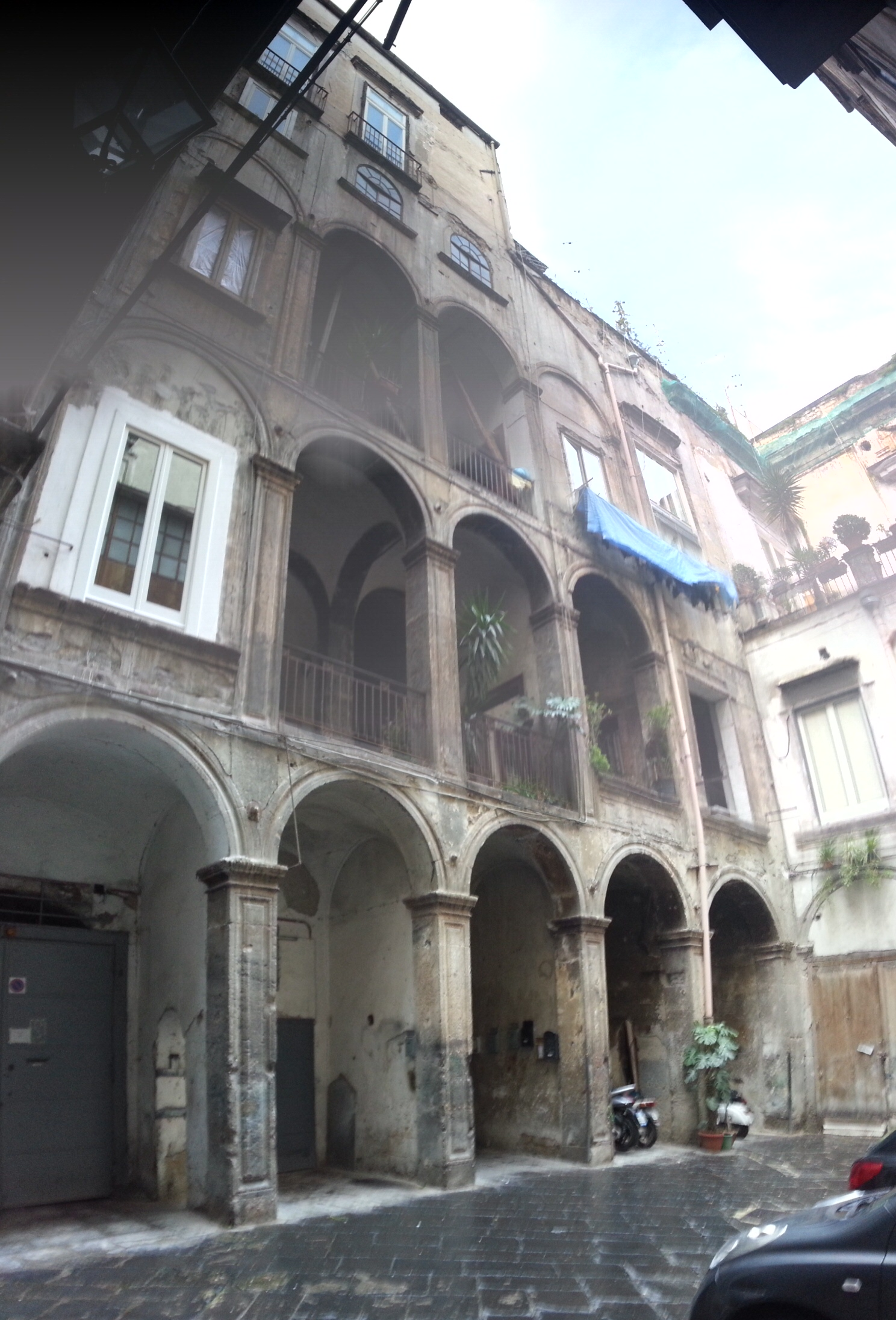
Il Palazzo d'Afflitto in Naples. Residence of don Girolomo d'Afflitto, Prince of Scanno

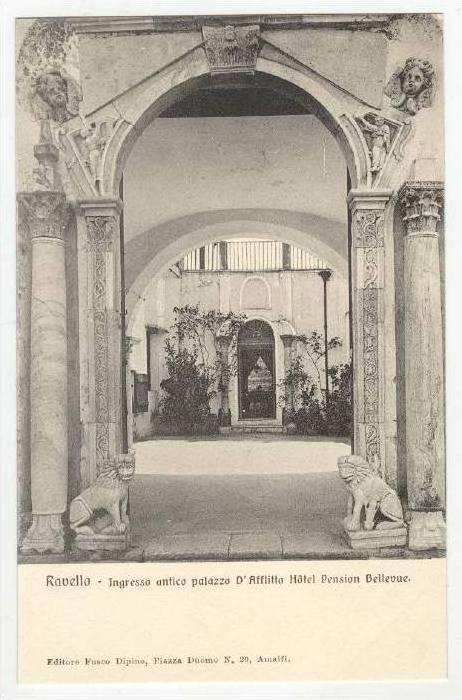
Il Palazzo d'Afflitto in Ravello. Today, hosts Hotel Caruso Belmod

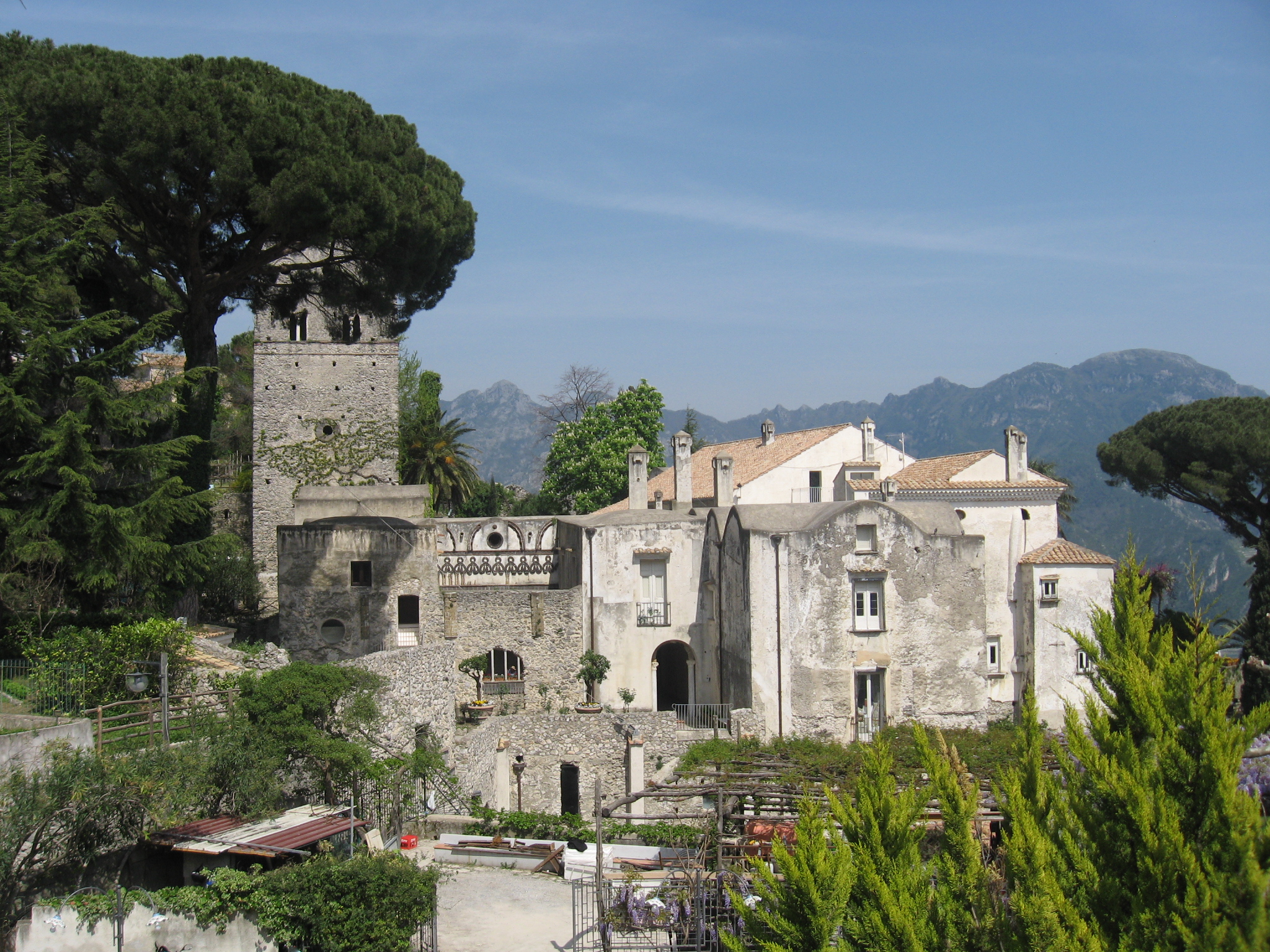
Villa Rufolo in Ravello, formerly Villa d'Afflitto

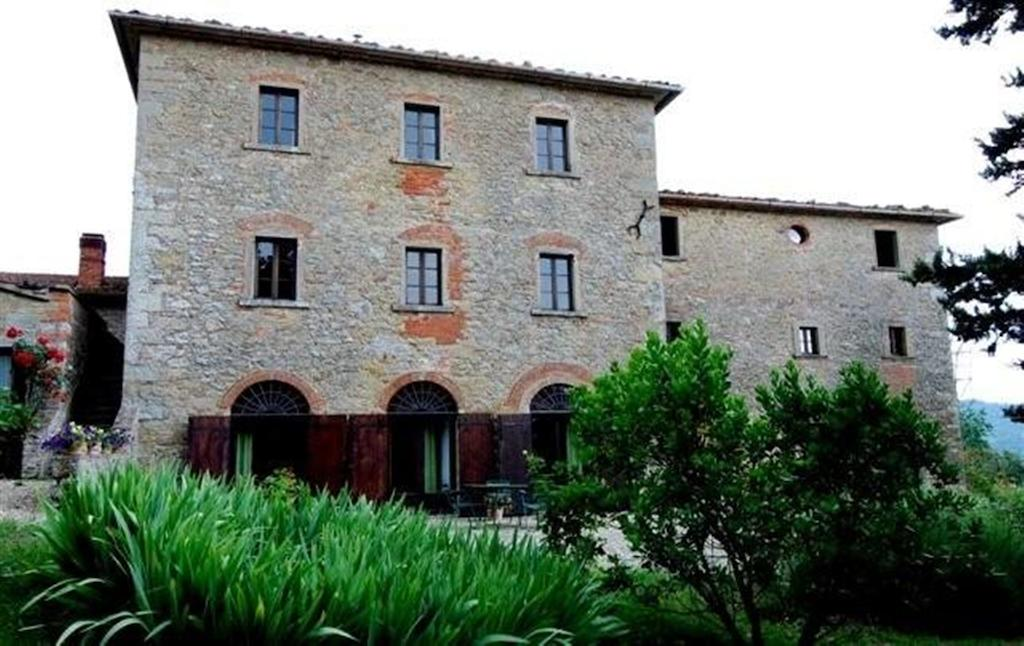
La Scheggia in Anghiari. 15th century rural hamlet. Residence of the current Marquis d'Afflitto
