= Feliciano Ninguarda =

Italian Roman Catholic prelate

Feliciano (spelled Felizian in Germany) Ninguarda (1524 – 5 June 1595) was an Italian Roman Catholic prelate and one of the main movers of the Counter Reformation. He was bishop of Scala, bishop of Sant’Agata de’ Goti, bishop of Como, governor of the bishopric of Regensburg and apostolic nuncio to Upper Germany.

== Life ==
Feliciano Ninguarda was born at Morbegno. He entered the Dominican order and studied theology in Milan. In 1554 he was made vicar general of the order for the German-speaking lands, as well as professor of theology at the University of Vienna. As procurator to the Archbishop of Salzburg he represented him in 1562 at the Council of Trent and was in line with the thinking of the German bishops in backing a reforming position against the existing church - he supported the foundation of seminaries to train priests, stricter enforcement of clerical celibacy, regular visits by bishops to their dioceses and the unification of liturgy. A series of synods in mid Germany from the 1570s onwards confirmed Ninguarda's reforming ideas, deciding on the foundation of seminaries in Alsace and the County of Tyrol. Even if not all of his ideas were always carried through, Ninguarda remained a fervent supporter of radical change within the Catholic church and was deeply knowledgeable about the reforms of Luther, Zwingli and Calvin, focussing his efforts on the areas they identified as in need of reform.

In 1577 Ninguarda was made bishop of Scala and in 1583 was transferred to be bishop of Sant'Agata de' Goti. His fellow-Dominican pope Pius V (who had visited the convent of Sant'Antonio at Morbegno and had a profound knowledge of the Valtellina and its frictions between Protestant and Catholic) and then pope Gregory XIII (of whom Ninguarda was a confidant) then utilised him for the difficult beginnings of the Counter Reformation in Germany, Austria and Bohemia, at first as visitor to the convents of all orders, then as papal nuncio to mid Germany (1578–82) and Switzerland (1586–88). As nuncio he travelled through Bavaria, Austria and Switzerland.

Between 1588 and 1595 he was bishop of Como, a diocese which included Valtellina and Valposchiavo, then both under the political control of the Three Leagues - in these Alpine borderlands with the Protestant world, Ninguarda tried to stop the spread of Protestantism. The reports from his apostolic visits to these towns in summer 1589 are historically important - they were the first apostolic visits by a Catholic bishop after a ban of many years by the Swiss authorities and the reports describe the parishes' and churches' states, the situation in other countries, the names of some priests and the numbers of Protestant residents and also include several theological and pastoral publications. On 13 June 1580 Gregory made him governor of the diocese of Regensburg, who bishop Philipp of Bavaria was still in his minority - he had been papal visitor to that diocese since 1574. He died in Como.

== Bibliography ==
- (in German) Josef Staber: Kirchengeschichte des Bistums Regensburg. Regensburg 1966, S. 125-127.
- (in German) Karl Bosl: Bosls bayerische Biographie. Regensburg 1983, S. 552 (online bei der BLO)
- (in German) Klaus Unterburger: Die Apostolischen Nuntien Bartolomeo Portia und Felician Ninguarda und das Bistum Augsburg im Reformationsjahrhundert. In: Jahrbuch / Verein für Augsburger Bistumsgeschichte e.V., 40 (2006), S. 127 - 159
- (in German) Klaus Unterburger: Der Apostolische Nuntius Feliciano Ninguarda und das Bistum Freising : ein Beitrag zu den Mechanismen der tridentinischen Reform im Gebiet des Heiligen Römischen Reichs. In: Beiträge zur altbayerischen Kirchengeschichte 49 (2006), S. 117 - 155.
- (in Italian) Alexander Koller, "Ninguarda, Feliciano," Dizionario Biografico degli Italiani Volume 78 (2013); retrieved: 16-08-2018.
