= Roman Catholic Diocese of Minori =

Former diocese in Campania, Italy

Basilica of S. Trofimena, Minori

The Diocese of Minori was a Roman Catholic diocese in Italy, located in Minori, province of Salerno, region of Campania in the ecclesiastical province of Amalfi. It lies on the coast of the Tyrrhenian Sea, 4 km or 3.5 mi east of Amalfi. In 1818, it was suppressed, and its territory and Catholic population assigned to the Archdiocese of Amalfi.

== History ==
The Diocese of Minori was established around 987. It served as a Roman Catholic diocese in Italy, with its seat in Minori, Campania.

=== Chapter and cathedral ===
The cathedral in Minori was dedicated to S. Trofimena. The body of that martyr, the patron of the city, is preserved in the church. In 1910, the former cathedral in Minori was named a Minor Basilica.

It was served and administered by an ecclesiastical body called the Chapter, which was composed of five dignities (the Archdeacon, the Cantor, the Primicerius, the Archpriest, and the Dean) and twelve (later fifteen) canons.

In 1670, the city of Minori had a population of c. 200 persons. In 1762, it is reported to have had a population of c. 700. The diocese had c. 2,000 members.

=== Reorganization of 1818 ===
Following the extinction of the Napoleonic Kingdom of Italy, the Congress of Vienna authorized the restoration of the Papal States and the Kingdom of Naples. Since the French occupation had seen the abolition of many Church institutions in the kingdom, as well as the confiscation of most Church property and resources, it was imperative that Pope Pius VII and King Ferdinand IV reach agreement on restoration and restitution. Ferdinand, however, was not prepared to accept the pre-Napoleonic situation, in which Naples was a feudal subject of the papacy. Lengthy, detailed, and acrimonious negotiations ensued.

In 1818, a new concordat with the Kingdom of the Two Sicilies committed the pope to the suppression of more than fifty small dioceses in the kingdom. These were carried out in the papal bull "De Utiliore" of 27 June 1818. Amalfi lost its status as a metropolitan archdiocese and became merely the Archdiocese of Amalfi, when its suffragan dioceses, Minori and Ravello, and Scala were suppressed.

=== Titular diocese ===
In 1968, the name, but not the diocese itseelf, was revived, as the Titular See of Minori.

== Bishops of Minori ==
Erected: 987 (Dioecesis Minorensis)
Metropolitan: Archdiocese of Amalfi

=== c. 987–1500 ===
- Sergius (c. 987)
- Ursus
- Jacquintus (c. 1069)
- Maurus (c. 1091–1103)
- Leo (c. 1103, 1105)
- Stephanus
- Constantinus
- Maurus Scannapeco (c. 1162)
- Laurentius (c. 1178)
- Joannes de Cavellis (c. 1217)
- Gerbinus (c. 1247)
- Petrus (c. 1266)
- Andreas de Capua (1281–1305)
- Andreas de Alaneo (1305–1342)
- Bartolommeo
- Marcutius (c. 1345–1348)
- Jacobus
- Philippus (1360–1363)
- Romanus (1363–1387)
- Thomas Scotti (1387–1390?) Avignon Obedience
- Paulus de Surrento (26 March 1390 – 1393) Roman Obedience

... (Sede vacante ? )

- Ambrosius Romano (attested 1411)
- Cristoforo Oliva (attested 1418)
- Nicola Moccia (Macza) (7 Jan 1426 – 1474)
- Ludovico da Senis, O.F.M. (1474–1475)
- Palamedes de Cuncto (1475–1483)
- Andrea de Conto (Cuncto) (6 Jun 1483 – 1484
- Giovanni Battista di Constabili (1484–1493)
- Santillo de Simione (1493–1498)

=== 1500 to 1818 ===
- Alessandro Salati (30 Apr 1498 – 1509)
- Tommaso di Sicilia, O.P. (30 Sep 1510 – 1 Jan 1526)
- Giovanni Pietro de Bono, O.P. (28 Feb 1526 – 6 Jun 1546 Died)
- Ambrogio Catarino Politi, O.P. (27 Aug 1546 –1552)
- Antonio Simeoni, O.S.B. (3 Jun 1552 –1553)
- Pierre de Affatatis (3 Jul 1553 – 1557)
- Donato Laurenti (21 Jun 1557 –1563)
- Alessandro Mollo (Moro) (15 Feb 1563 – 1565)
- Giovanni D'Amato (12 Oct 1565 – 1567 Resigned)
- Giovanni Agostino Campanile (8 Aug 1567 – 4 Jul 1595)
- Orazio Basilisco (29 May 1596 – 29 Jul 1596)
- Tommaso Zerula (8 Jan 1597 – 6 Dec 1603)
- Giorgio Lazzari, O.P. (1604–1615)
- Tommaso Brandolini, O.P. (1615–1636)
- Loreto de Franchis (1636–1638)
- Patrizio Donati (1639–1648 Resigned)
- Leonardo Leria, O. Carm. (1649–1670 Resigned)
- Antonio Bottis, C.R.S. (17 Nov 1670 – 1679)
- Domenico Menna (20 Dec 1683 – Aug 1691)
- Gennaro Crespino (10 Mar 1692 – 1694)
- Carlo Cutillo, O.S.B. (13 Sep 1694 – Dec 1704)
- Francesco Morgioni (18 May 1705 – 18 Nov 1712)
- Raffaele Tosti (8 Feb 1719 – Mar 1722)
- Silvestro Stanà (Staria) (1 Jun 1722 – 26 Nov 1761)
- Andrea Torre, C.P.O. (25 Jan 1762 – 24 Dec 1791)
- Serafino Vitale, O.S.B. (29 Jan 1798 – 1806)

Sede vacante (1806–1818)

=== Titular bishops of Minori ===
- Mario Giordana (2004 – ...)

== See also ==
- Archdiocese of Amalfi-Cava de' Tirreni
- Catholic Church in Italy

== Books ==
=== Lists of bishops ===
- Eubel, Conradus, ed. (1913). Hierarchia catholica, Tomus 1 (second ed.). Münster: Libreria Regensbergiana. (in Latin)
- Eubel, Conradus, ed. (1914). Hierarchia catholica, Tomus 2 (second ed.). Münster: Libreria Regensbergiana.
- Gulik, Guilelmus (1923). Eubel, Conradus (ed.). Hierarchia catholica, Tomus 3 (second ed.). Münster: Libreria Regensbergiana.
- Gams, Pius Bonifatius (1873). Series episcoporum Ecclesiae catholicae: quotquot innotuerunt a beato Petro apostolo (in Latin). Ratisbon: Typis et Sumptibus Georgii Josephi Manz.
- Gauchat, Patritius (Patrice) (1935). Hierarchia catholica IV (1592-1667). Münster: Libraria Regensbergiana.
- Ritzler, Remigius; Sefrin, Pirminus (1952). Hierarchia catholica medii et recentis aevi V (1667-1730). Patavii: Messagero di S. Antonio.
- Ritzler, Remigius; Sefrin, Pirminus (1958). Hierarchia catholica medii et recentis aevi VI (1730-1799). Patavii: Messagero di S. Antonio.

=== Studies ===
- Cappelletti, Giuseppe (1866). Le chiese d'Italia della loro origine sino ai nostri giorni (in Italian). Vol. 20 (vigesimo). Venezia: Giuseppe Antonelli. p. 615.
- Moroni, (Gaetano (ed.) (1847). " Minori," (in Italian), in: Dizionario di erudizione storico-ecclesiastica vol. 40 (Venice: Tip. Emiliana 1847), pp. 197-201.
- Ughelli, Ferdinando; Coleti, NIccolo (1721). Italia sacra sive De episcopis Italiæ, et insularum adjacentium (in Latin). Vol. 7 (Tomus septimus). Venice: apud Sebastianum Coleti. pp. 281–321.
