= Andrea Turini =

Italian physician and writer

Andrea Turini or Thurini (circa 1473 – 1543) was an Italian physician and writer.

Born in Pescia in Tuscany, he became a professor of medicine at the University of Pisa. He became a prominent physician, serving both Popes Clement VII and Paul III. He also was a physician for the French kings Louis XII and Francis I. He published a book on his medical practice (Opera Andreae Thurini) in 1545. Tom Virzi attributed a Portrait of a Man and a Dog, depicting Turini, to Raphael in 1910. Andrea's brother Baldassare had been a datary in the papal court and was a friend of Raphael.
