= Trofimena =

Roman Catholic saint

Trofimena is a female saint canonised in the Roman Catholic Church. Originally from the town of Patti, Sicily (and closely connected to the figure of Saint Febronia), the relics of Trofimena are venerated in the basilica in the town of Minori, Italy on the coast of Amalfi, southern Italy.

== Hagiography ==
Trofimena's hagiographical history is unfortunately contorted. The key legend says she was martyred while still a young girl in the town of Patti in Sicily, around the age of 12 or 13 by her own father because she wanted to be baptised and embrace Christianity.

A story is told of a vision of an angel who announced her consecration to Christ and imminent martyrdom, and advised against wedding plans already advanced by her family. After death, Trofimena's body is hidden protectively in an urn and thrown into the sea, the current taking it to the coast of Salerno in southern Italy, and directly to the town of Minori. The urn is discovered by the people of Minori who have it carried by a pair of white calves in the presence of Bishop Peter of Amalfi (c.829); and where the beasts stop a church is built and dedicated. The calves refusing to move from the spot and the people interpreting it as a divine signal on the choice of place.

At least one modern scholar has drawn parallels with the myth of the siren, Parthenope, who was said to inhabit the small islands of the shore of Naples with her sisters. When she had failed to win over Ulysses with her music, Parthenope died and her body was carried by ocean currents to the shore where the people discovered the goddess with closed eyes and white face, and took her remains to place them in a magnificent tomb accompanied by sacrifices and torchlight processions to the sea.

== Medieval despoliation of relics ==
View of Minori

The subsequent history of the town of Minori is tied to the cult and veneration of Trofimena and for more than 1,000 years the town has jealously conserved her relics.

The relics have a historic record certainly stretching back to at least 838–839 AD according to an anonymous 9th century chronicler that narrated the discovery and transferral of the relics under Sicard, the Longobard Prince of Benevento. Under that account, the relics were deposited in the town church with great pomp. Miracles were then said to have occurred, and large charitable donations made. By visions and other indications the saint expressed her determination to remain.

Trofimena's repose was short, for in the year 838 Sicard of Benevento, having erected a church in his own capital, went in search of relics for it, and engaged some sailors from the neighbouring city of Amalfi to procure for him the body of St. Bartholomew, preserved in Lipari. The Amalfitans, fearing that Sicard might also seize Trofimena's relics from Minori (a town not capable of repelling attack), carried the remains by boat to Amalfi, and deposited them in their cathedral.

Again the legend records Trofimena's displeasure at being taken from Minori when Bishop Peter is warned that he will die shortly for violating the tomb, and his corpse eaten by wild dogs.

Sicard, returning from a successful expedition against the Saracens, directed his fleet towards Amalfi, invaded the city, and carried away the bones - first to Salerno, and from there to Benevento. Bishop Peter's tomb was violated and his body indeed left to the dogs.

However the following year, 839, Sicard was assassinated, and two priests from Minori immediately begged for the surrender of the saint with both Prince Radelchis and the Bishop of Benevento, threatening Radelchis with the eternal enmity of the Amalfitans in case of refusal. Before the arrival of the relics of Andrew from Constantinople, Trofimena enjoyed considerable veneration along the whole of the Amalfi territory, because she was the only saint of whom they possessed actual relics. An agreement was reached to release the body excluding the top of the skull. The relics were transported to Minori, with much rejoicing, and on 13 July 840 were jealously hidden within the basilica.

In 987 Minori was elevated to a bishopric. However, the passing centuries led to the memory of the exact position of the relics being lost. Despite having a number of names - Trufumena, Trefonia, Febronia – on 21 January 1673 the Sacred Congregation of Rites in Rome confirmed that the saint would be known henceforth in the martyrs calendar as Trofimena.

In 1694 the Neapolitan playwright Carmino Scassafer published a "sacred tragedy" entitled L'Innocenza per seguitata overo Santa Trofimena, dealing dramatically with the life of the saint.

Bishop Silvestro Stana began the remodelling of the cathedral in the late-18th century, and a few years later the relics were rediscovered on the night of 27 November 1793.

== Modern-day veneration ==
Today, Trofimena's relics are housed in the basilica in Minori. A medieval church was built around c.700 on the original basement of an ancient Roman church; was remodelled in the 12th century; and this was superseded by a complete rebuilding in the 18th century. In the crypt of the Basilica, on the main altar, the remains of Santa Trofimena are kept in an alabaster urn designed by the sculptor Gennaro Ragazzino in 1722.

A church of Trofimena still exists in Salerno where some of her relics (the top of her skull) are preserved. In modern-day New York City emigrants from Minori have erected a chapel to Trofimena and have a copy of the statue that is carried in procession as part of the celebrations as Patroness of Minori.

=== Feast days ===
Three feast days honour Trofimena in the religious calendar of Catholic saints.

5 November is the celebration of the original discovery of her relics on the beach of Minori in the 700s.

The 27 November celebration marks the rediscovery of the reliquary urn in the late 18th century.

The 13 July has become the most important festival as it falls during the summer and commemorates an important miracle. Minori was being attacked from the sea by Arab pirates. Villagers invoked the intercession of Trofimena who on a summer day summoned up a tempest that shipwrecked the attackers.

== Trofimena and Febronia ==
According to her sixth-century Vita, Febronia of Nisibis was a beautiful nun martyred during the Diocletian persecution. Her cult began in Syria, and spread from there to Constantinople, Southern Italy and Sicily. Translations of Febronia's "Passio" suggest her name reappears as Phebronia, Pambroniya, Sephronia, Sophronia, and Trofimena

Although the Synaxarium of Constantinople claims that Febronia's relics reached the city by 363, there seems to be no evidence of her cult in Constantinople before the seventh century. At that time she appears as an assistant to St. Artemios in the Miracles of St. Artemios, which describe a chapel erected to Febronia in the church of St. John Prodomos.

The 7th century Emperor Heraclius may have had a daughter by his second wife, Martina, named Febronia; and his campaigns in Mesopotamia could perhaps have brought him into contact with the legend of a local martyr, Febronia, and through him, therefore, her story could have been "Byzantinized."

Febronia's Latin life dates to the ninth century, not long after a series of Syrian popes came to Italy in the eighth century. A cult around Febronia subsequently sprung up in Palagonia (CT), Patti (ME) and Minori(SA).

According to modern scholars, it is extremely likely that the legends of Febronia and Trofimena are one and the same.
