= João Alves (bishop) =

Portuguese Roman Catholic bishop

- Bishop of Coimbra
- Bishop João Alves (right), in Figueiró dos Vinhos, 1985
- Church: Catholic Church
- Diocese: Diocese of Coimbra
- In office: 8 September 1976 – 24 March 2001
- Predecessor: João António da Silva Saraiva
- Successor: Albino Mamede Cleto
- Previous posts: Titular Bishop of Scala (1975-1976); Auxiliary Bishop of Coimbra (1975-1976)

Orders
- Ordination: 29 June 1951
- Consecration: 23 November 1975 by António Ribeiro

Personal details
- Born: 13 December 1925 Torres Novas, Santarém District, Portugal
- Died: 28 June 2013 (aged 87) Coimbra, Coimbra District, Portugal

João Alves (13 December 1925 − 28 June 2013) was a Portuguese Catholic bishop.

Alves was born on 13 December 1925 in Torres Novas.

Ordained in 1951, Alves was named bishop in 1975. In 1976, he was appointed bishop of the Diocese of Coimbra and retired in 2001.

Alves died on 28 June 2013, aged 87, in Coimbra.
