= Lancelotto Politi =

Italian Dominican canon lawyer, theologian, and bishop

Most Reverend Ambrosius Catharinus
- Bishop of Minori
- Church: Catholic Church
- In office: 1546–1552
- Predecessor: Giovanni Pietro De Bono
- Successor: Antonio Simeoni

Orders
- Ordination: 27 August 1517
- Consecration: 21 December 1546

Personal details
- Born: 1484 Siena, Italy
- Died: 8 November 1553 (aged 68–69) Naples

Lancelotto Politi (religious name Ambrosius Catharinus; 1483–1553) was an Italian Dominican canon lawyer, theologian and bishop.

The 1913 Catholic Encyclopedia describes Catharinus as a "brilliant eccentric", and asserts that, despite frequent accusations of heresy, his teachings were always "within the bounds of orthodoxy".

== Life ==
Politi was born at Siena. At sixteen, he became Doctor of Civil and Canon Law (J.U.D.) at the Siena Academy. After visiting many academies in Italy and France, he was appointed (1508) a professor at Siena. He had among his pupils Giovanni del Monte, afterward Pope Julius III, and Sixtus of Siena, a converted Jew who esteemed his master yet severely criticized some of his writings.

In about 1513, he entered the Order of St. Dominic in the convent of St. Mark in Florence. There, he studied scripture and theology without a master. This may account for his independence and his defense of singular opinions, especially regarding predestination, the certitude of possessing grace, the residence of bishops in their dioceses, and the intention required in the minister of a sacrament.

He was a strenuous defender of Catholicism against Martin Luther and his followers and was prominent in the discussions of the Council of Trent, to which he was called by his former pupil, Cardinal del Monte, legate of Paul III. In the third public session (4 February 1546), Catharinus pronounced a notable discourse, later published ["Oratio ad Patres Conc. Trid." (Louvain, 1567; Paris, 1672)].

Notwithstanding attacks upon his teaching, he was appointed Bishop of Minori in 1546, and, in 1552, Archbishop of Conza, Province of Naples. Pope Julius III, the successor of Paul III, called Politi to Rome, intending, says Jacques Échard, to elevate him to the cardinalate, but he died before reaching Rome.

Pallavicino and other authorities declare that the Council of Trent did not condemn his singular opinions. He defended the Immaculate Conception of the Blessed Virgin. According to Échard, he regretted towards the end of his life the vehemence with which he had combatted Cardinal Cajetan and Father Dominic Soto. He died at Naples.

== Works ==
His principal works (for a complete list, see Echard) are:

- Apologia pro veritate catholicæ et apostolicæ fldei ac doctrinæ, adversus impia ac pestifera Martini Lutheri dogmata (Florence, 1520)
- Speculum hæreticorum (Lyons, 1541), with two opuscula on original sin and justification
- Annotationes in commentaria Cajetani super sacram Scripturam (Lyons, 1542)
- Tractatus quæstionis quo jure episcoporum residentia debeatur (Venice, 1547)
- Defensio catholicorum pro possibili certitudine gratiæ (ibid., 1547)
- Es bonus corripuit editor ad hoc intendere usus invexit errorem (Rome, 1548)
- Summa doctrinæ de prædestinatione (Rome, 1550)
- Commentaria in omnes D. Pauli epistolas et alias septem canonicas (Venice, 1551)
- Disputatio pro veritate immaculatæ conceptionis B. Virginis (Rome, 1551)

He also published numerous opuscules, e.g., on Providence and predestination, the state of children dying without baptism, giving communion to young children, celibacy, and the Scriptures and their translation into the vernacular.
