= Roman Catholic Diocese of Scala =

Titular see of the Catholic Church

Diocese of Scala Scala (adjective: Scalensis) Scala
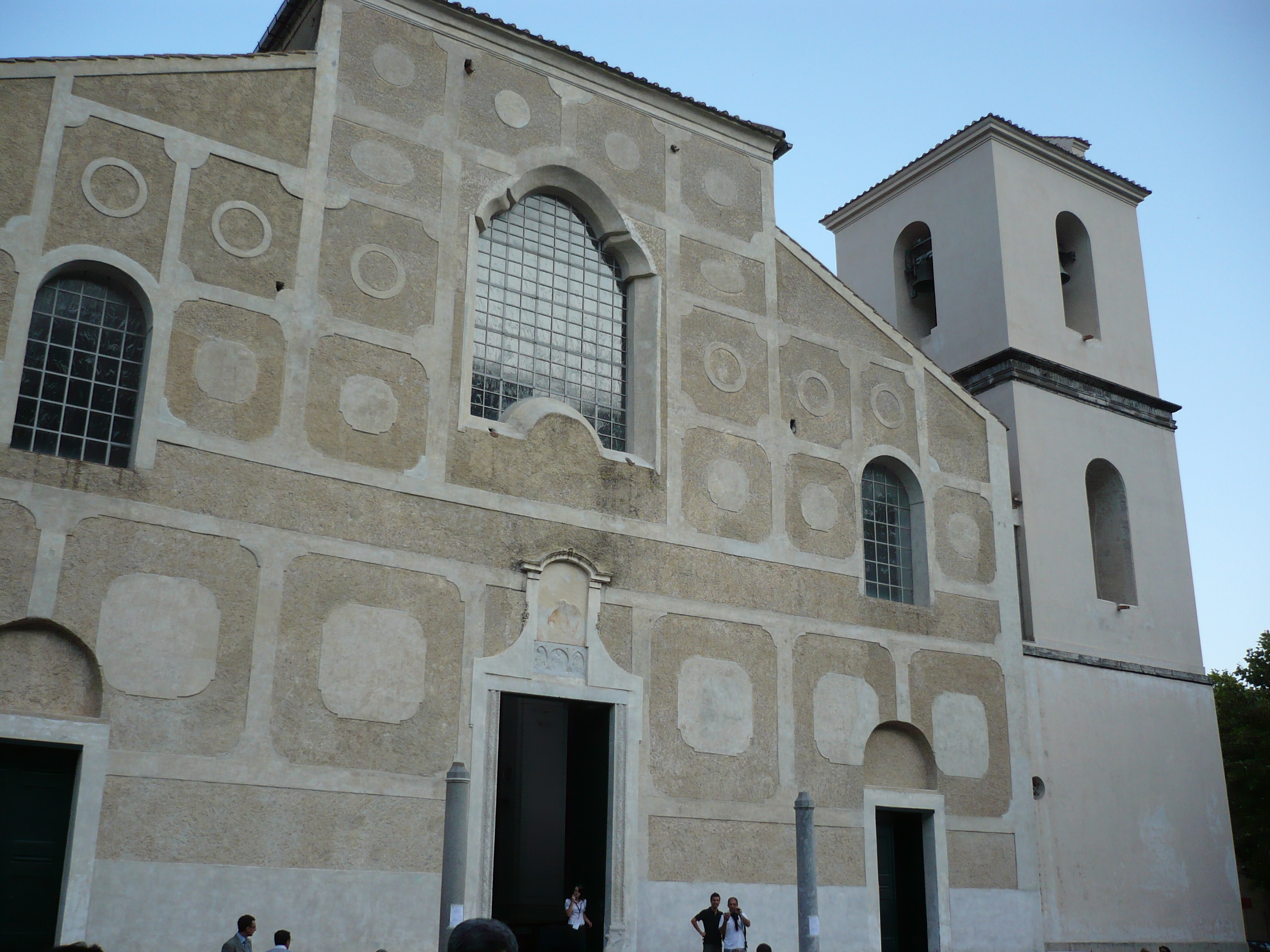
- Former Cathedral of S. Lorenzo, Scala

Location
- Ecclesiastical province: Archdiocese of Amalfi-Cava de' Tirreni
- Coordinates: 40°39′N 14°36′E

Statistics
- Area: 13 km^{2} (5.0 sq mi)
- Population: Total: (as of 2017); 1516

Information
- Denomination: Roman Catholic
- Rite: Latin Rite
- Established: after 987 (suppressed on 27 June 1818)

Current leadership
- Pope: Leo XIV
- Titular Archbishop: Edward Joseph Adams

Styles of Edward Joseph Adams
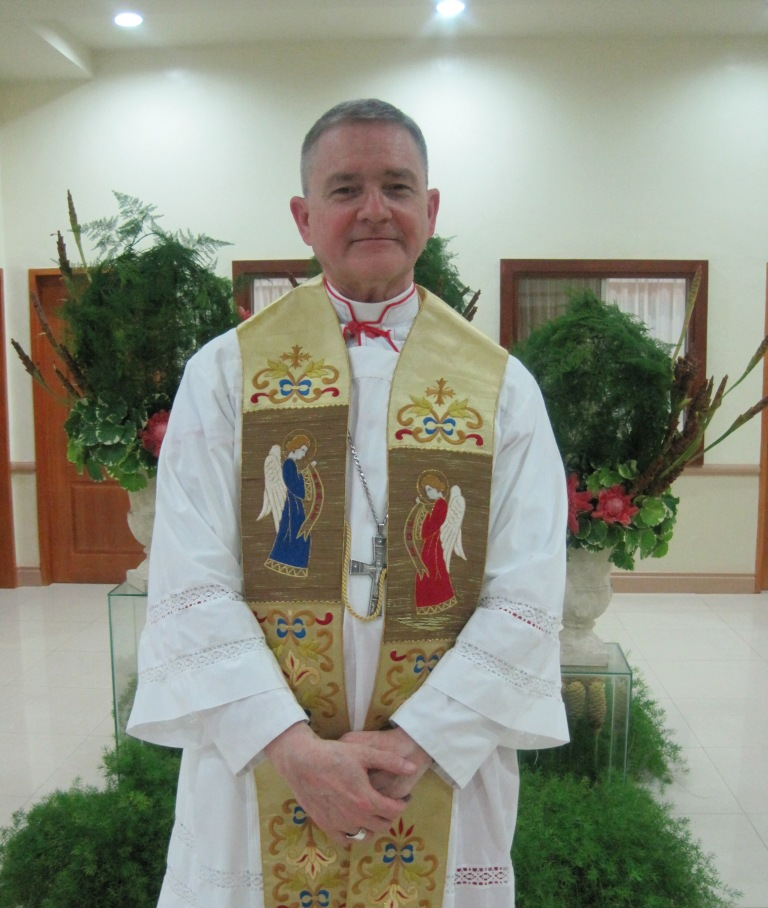
- Reference style: His Excellency
- Spoken style: Your Excellency
- Religious style: Titular Archbishop of Scala

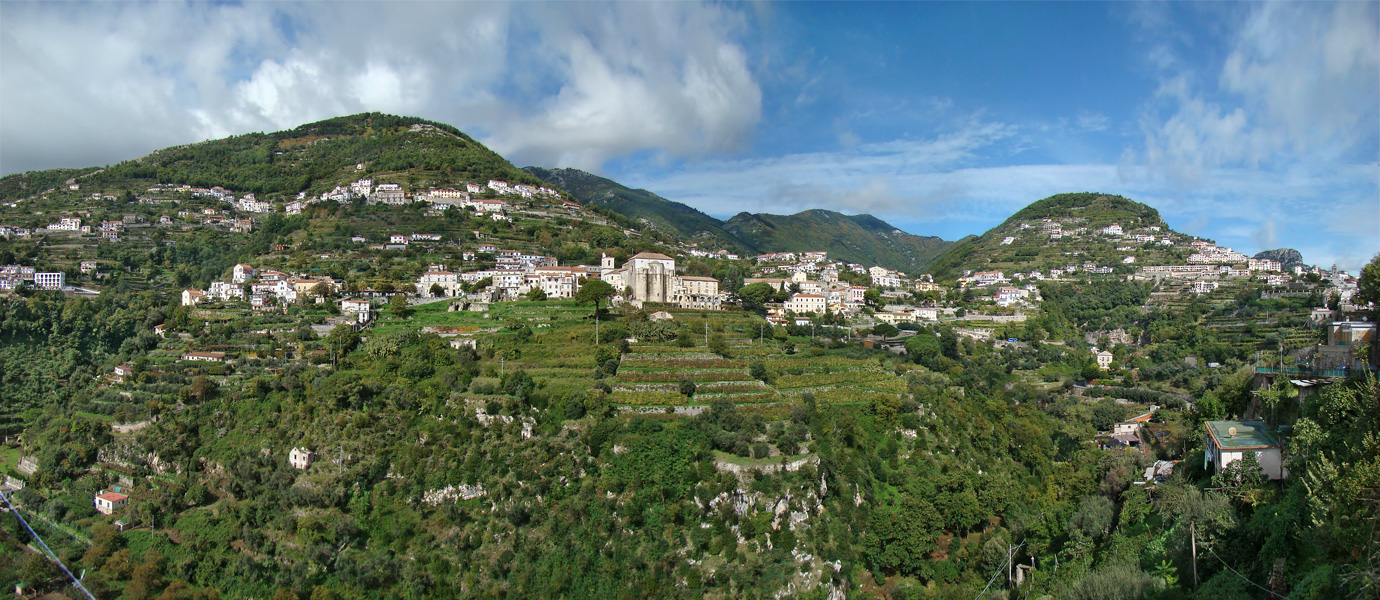
Scala, viewed from Ravello.

The Diocese of Scala was established perhaps around or after 987 as a regular diocese with its cathedra (seat) in Scala on the Amalfi Coast of Italy. On 31 July 1603 it was united aeque principaliter (two dioceses governed by one bishop, 'on equal terms') with the diocese of Ravello. On 27 June 1818 the dioceses of Ravello and Scala were suppressed by Pope Pius VII. All their territory was incorporated into the Archdiocese of Amalfi, now the Archdiocese of Amalfi-Cava de' Tirreni.

In 1968 Scala was established as a titular see of the Catholic Church.

== History ==
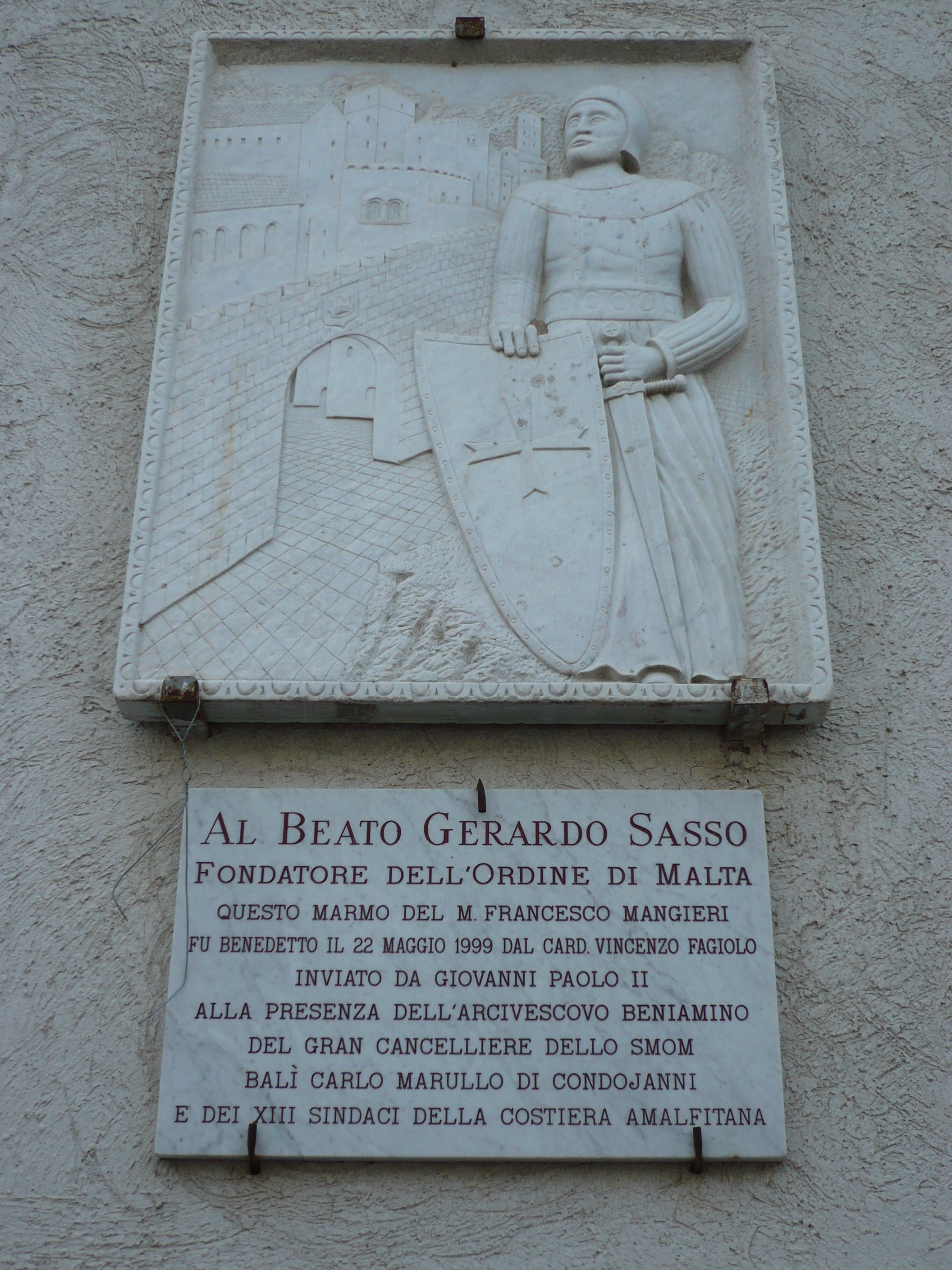
Inscription and bas-relief made with marble dedicated to Gerardo Sasso in Scala

Scala is claimed to be the oldest town on the Amalfi coast, set about 400 metres (1,300 ft) above sea level.

According to a tradition, found in local chronicles, the town of Scala was founded after 337 AD by a group of shipwrecked Romans who had fled from Ragusa and were trying to make their way to Byzantium. they settled first at Amalfi, and when they were being attacked, they fled to Ebulum, then to Montana, which is now called Scala. The aristocracy of the Amalfi coast, including Scala, insisted on tracing their ancestry to Romans, in the belief that it gave them superiority to all their neighbors, whom they identified as Lombards, Normans, Angevins, and Aragonese. The Afflitti of Scala, in particular, traced their ancestry to the martyr Eustathius, master of the cavalry of the Emperor Trajan (98–117). A Matteo D'Afflitto, perhaps in the 10th century, established the Church of S. Eustachio in the diocese of Scala, in the village called Scallela, now called Pontone.

A fortified bastion, Scala was part of the defensive system of the territory of Amalfi. Its history is closely related to that of the Republic of Amalfi (10th to 11th cent.).

=== Establishment of diocese ===
The diocese was established and its first bishop consecrated by Archbishop Leo, the first archbishop of Amalfi, who, at the time of his own consecration in Rome, on 13 February 988, had been granted the privilege of establishing three bishoprics in his ecclesiastical territory. After his return to Amalfi, perhaps in 988, first he established the diocese of Capri and consecrated Bishop Ioannes. Secondly he established Scala and consecrated Bishop Sergius. Thirdly he established the diocese of Littere and consecrated Bishop Stephen. There is no indication of a chronology. Only the "Chronicon Archiepiscoporum Amalphitanum" refers to this series of events.

The diocese of Scala was regularly in the hands of a bishop from the Afflitto family. These included: Orso d' Afflitto (1144), Costantino (1209–1223), Matteo d'Aflitto bishop of Monopoli, then of Scala (1227–1269); Natale d ' Afflitto (1418–1450), and Francesco d' Afflitto (1583–1593). In nearby dioceses: Angelo d'Afflitto of Scala was bishop of Anagni (1405); Orsillo d' Afflitto di Scala was bishop of Monopoli (1405); Francesco d'Afflitto was bishop of Nardò (1452); Annibale d'Afflitto was archbishop of Reggio Calabriae (1593); Francescantonio d' Afflitto was Vicar-general of the diocese of Amalfi, then bishop S. Marco (Calabria) (1580).

In 1073 during the Norman conquest of southern Italy, after a strong siege, Scala was burned by Robert Guiscard. Subsequently, it was sacked twice by the Pisans (1135–1136); by the Emperor Otto IV (1210); and by the Sicilians (1283). The war between the Angevins and the Aragonese following the Sicilian Vespers of 1282 brought hardship and dislocation to Scala; many fled to Benevento or to Naples. Charles II of Naples demanded in 1290 that the refugees return.

On 13 March 1192, Pope Celestine III issued the bull "In Apostolicae Sedis," in which he took the diocese of Scala under papal protection, and confirmed the boundaries of the diocese in precise detail. He also confirmed the right of the cathedral Chapter to elect the bishop when a vacancy occurred.

=== Ravello e Scala ===
On 31 July 1603, Pope Clement VIII united the diocese of Scala with the diocese of Ravello, aeque personaliter. The privilege of Ravello's exemption from all other jurisdictions except the papacy continued even after the union of the two dioceses. Scala, however, was a suffragan of the archdiocese of Amalfi.

=== Chapter and cathedral ===
The cathedral of the diocese, dedicated to Saint Lawrence, was built in its original form during the 12th century in Romanesque style. IT was rebuilt or restored in 1406, 1481, 1524, and 1616. It was modified in the 17th and 18th centuries, preserving only the original structure of the portal. The interior is in the form of a nave and two aisles, with high-quality stuccoes and a vault decorated with scenes from the saint's life (1748).

In the Gothic-style crypt is the colored stucco sarcophagus of Marinella Rufolo with a group of 14th-century wooden statues and other sculptures commissioned by her widower, Antonio Coppola.

Scala during the height of its economic splendor had about 130 churches, of which 30 were parish churches. It is also noted as the birthplace of Gerard Thom (Gerardo de Saxo), the founder of the Order of the Knights of St. John of Jerusalem, or the Knights Hospitaller.

The contemplative religious order for women called the Redemptoristines was founded and established in Scala in the 1730s, through the efforts of Father Maurizio Filangeri, Father Tommaso Falcoia, and Father Alphonsus Liguori.

=== Reorganization of 1818 ===
Following the extinction of the Napoleonic Kingdom of Italy, the Congress of Vienna authorized the restoration of the Papal States and the Kingdom of Naples. Since the French occupation had seen the abolition of many Church institutions in the kingdom, as well as the confiscation of most Church property and resources, it was imperative that Pope Pius VII and King Ferdinand IV reach agreement on restoration and restitution. Ferdinand, however, was not prepared to accept the pre-Napoleonic situation, in which Naples was a feudal subject of the papacy. Lengthy, detailed, and acrimonious negotiations ensued.

In 1818, a new concordat with the Kingdom of the Two Sicilies committed the pope to the suppression of more than fifty small dioceses in the kingdom. These were carried out in the papal bull "De Utiliore" of 27 June 1818. Amalfi lost its status as a metropolitan archdiocese and became merely the Archdiocese of Amalfi, even though it gained territories from the suppressed dioceses of Minori and of Ravello and Scala.

=== Titular See of Scala ===
In 1968, the name Scala, but not the diocese itself, was revived as a titular see of the Catholic Church. Additional titular sees were needed as theoretical bishoprics for the increasing number of auxiliary bishops, papal Apostolic Delegates and Nuncios, and middle-level bureaucrats in the papal Curia, whose offices required a certain standing in the Hierarchy of the Church. The title of Scala is currently held by Archbishop Edward Joseph Adams, who was Apostolic Nuncio to Great Britain, and is now retired.

== Bishops of Scala ==
=== Diocesan bishops ===
- Sergio (987 - ?)
- Alessandro (1118 - ?)
- Orso D'Afflitto (1144 - ?)
- Alessandro (II) (1171 - after 1191)
- Costantino D'Afflitto (c. 1207 - after 1223)
- Matteo D'Afflitto (c. 1227 – c. 1269)
- An unnamed bishop (mentioned in 1313)
- Teodoro Scacciavento (1328 - ?)
- Guglielmo Lombardo, O.P. (c. 1335 - 1342)
- Guglielmo (II), O.F.M. (1342 - 1349)
- Giacomo Sazali, O.P. (23 June 1349 - 1369)
- Guillaume Vaysserie, O.P. (7 August 1384 - ?), Avignon Obedience

ο Andrea Fusco (1390 -1397), bishop-elect Avignon Obedience

- Pietro (c. 1394 ? - 1395)
- Petruccio da Penne, O.P. (1395-1418), Roman Obedience
- Natale Mastini D'Afflitto (1418-1450)
- Evangelista Frioli, Bethlehemites (31 July 1450 - 1465)
- Matteo Doti (20 February 1469 - 1499)
- Giacomo Pisanelli (1500-1511)
- Ferdinando de Castro (17 September 1511 - 1515)
- Baltasar del Río (22 October 1515 - 1 January 1540)
- Lodovico Vanino de Theodoli, O.S.A. (19 January 1541 -1548)
- Gaspare Ricciullo del Fosso, O.M. (17 May 1548 - 22 April 1551 - transferred to Calvi)

° Alfonso Romero, O.F.M. (1551) bishop-elect

- Costantino Piccioni, O.S.A. (1552-1577)
- Feliciano Ninguarda, O.P. (25 February 1577 - 31 January 1583 - transferred to Sant'Agata de' Goti)
- Francesco D'Afflitto (27 June 1583 - 11 October 1593)
- Giovanni Battista Serignano, O.P. (1594)
- Floriano Nanni, C.R.Lat. (7 November 1594 - 19 September 1598)
- Francesco Bennio De Butrio, O.S.M. (25 November 1598 - 31 July 1603 - transferred to Ravello and Scala)

=== Titular bishops ===
- Joseph Alphonse McNicholas (1969-1975)
- João Alves (1975-1976)
- Marion Francis Forst (1976-1986)
- George Pell (1987-1996)
- Edward Joseph Adams (1996– ...)

== See also ==
- List of Catholic dioceses in Italy
- Changes in Ecclesiastical Jurisdictions in Italy (Gabriel Chow, GCatholic.org)

== Books ==
=== Lists of bishops ===
- Eubel, Conradus, ed. (1913). Hierarchia catholica (in Latin). Vol. 1 (Tomus 1) (second ed.). Münster: Libreria Regensbergiana. p. 437.. Archived.
- Eubel, Conradus, ed. (1914). Hierarchia catholica (in Latin). Vol. 2 (Tomus 2) (second ed.). Münster: Libreria Regensbergiana. p. 231.. Archived.
- Eubel, Conradus, ed. (1923). Hierarchia catholica (in Latin). Vol. 3 (Tomus 3) (second ed.). Münster: Libreria Regensbergiana. p. 294.. Archived.
- Gams, Pius Bonifatius (1873). Series episcoporum Ecclesiae catholicae: quotquot innotuerunt a beato Petro apostolo (in Latin). Ratisbon: Typis et Sumptibus Georgii Josephi Manz. p. 921.
- Gauchat, Patritius (Patrice) (1935). Hierarchia catholica IV (1592-1667) (in Latin). Münster: Libraria Regensbergiana. p. 306.

=== Studies ===
- Camera, Matteo (1836). Istoria della città e costiera di Amalfi: in due parti divisa. (in Italian). Napoli: Fibreno. pp. 301-334.
- Camera, Matteo (1881) Memorie storico-diplomatiche dell' antica città e ducato di Amalfi, cronologicamente ordinate e continuate sino al secolo XVIII. (in Italian). Vol. II. Salerno: tip. Nazionale. pp. 251-291.
- Cappelletti, Giuseppe (1866). Le chiese d'Italia della loro origine sino ai nostri giorni (in Italian). Vol. 20 (vigesimo). Venezia: Giuseppe Antonelli. pp. 612–614.
- "Chronicon Amalphitanum," (in Latin), in: Raccolta di varie croniche, diarj, ed altri opuscoli cosi italiani, come latini appartenenti alla storia del regno di Napoli Vol. 5 (Napoli: Bernardo Perger 1782), pp. 145-162 .
- Kehr, Paulus Fridolinus (1935). Italia pontificia. Vol. VIII: Regnum Normannorum—Campania. (in Latin). Berlin: Weidmann. pp. 395–396.
- Ughelli, Ferdinando; Coleti, NIccolo (1721). Italia sacra sive De episcopis Italiæ, et insularum adjacentium (in Latin). Vol. 7 (Tomus septimus). Venice: apud Sebastianum Coleti. pp. 321–342.

==== External links ====
- "Diocese of Scala". Catholic-Hierarchy.org. David M. Cheney.
- "Diocese of Scala (Titular)". Catholic-Hierarchy.org. David M. Cheney.
- Titular Episcopal See of Scala on gcatholic.org
