= Minori, Campania =

Minori
- Comune
- Comune di Minori
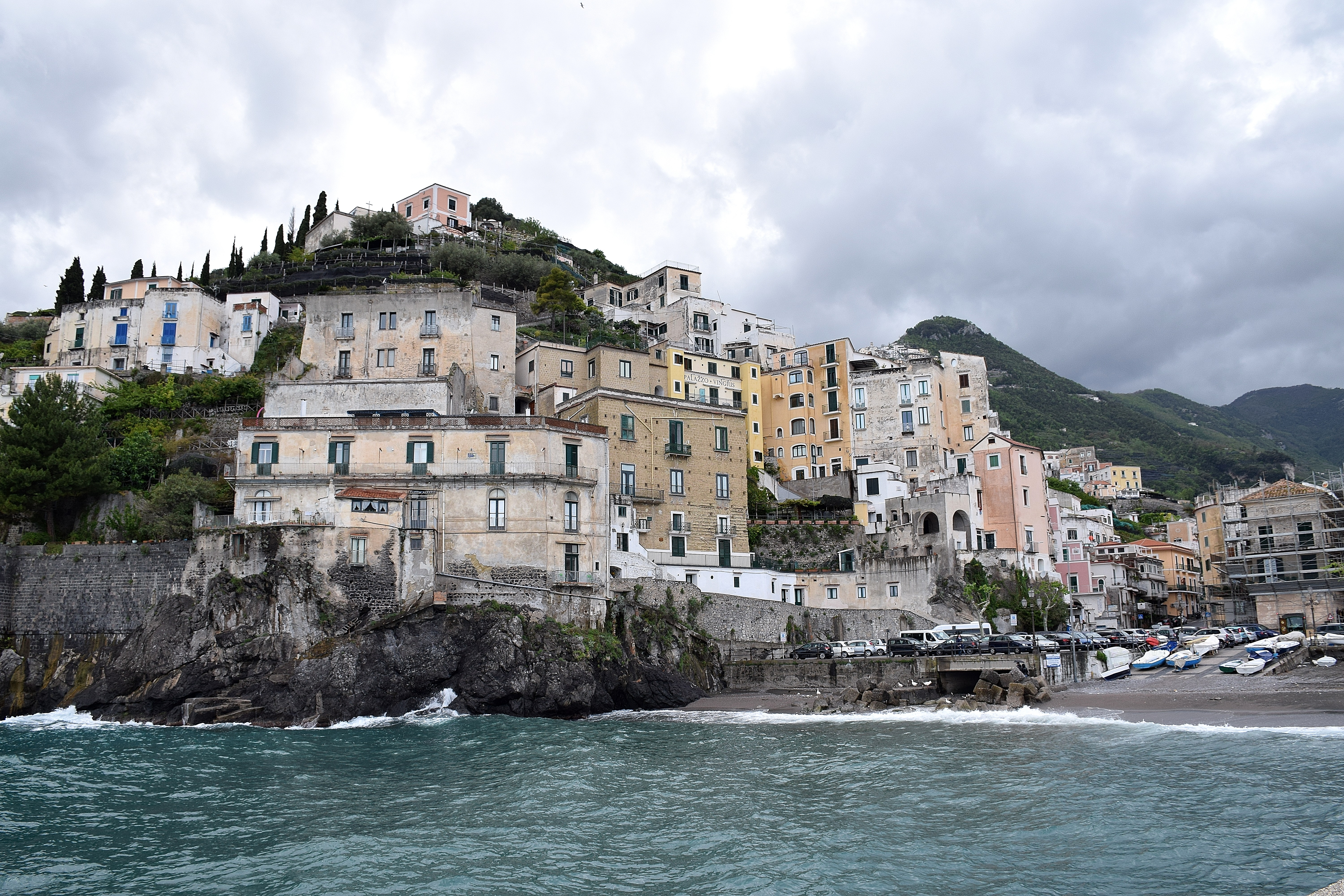
- Western part of Minori, on the road to Amalfi

- Coat of arms

- Position of Minori within the Province of Salerno

- Location of Minori in Italy Minori (Campania)
- Coordinates: 40°39′N 14°37′E
- Country: Italy
- Region: Campania
- Province: Salerno (SA)
- Frazioni: Monte, Torre, Villamena

Government
  - Mayor: Andrea Reale (Via Nova civic list)

Area
  - Total: 2.66 km^{2} (1.03 sq mi)
- Elevation: 5 m (16 ft)

Population (30 November 2019)
  - Total: 2,687
  - Density: 1,010/km^{2} (2,620/sq mi)
- Demonym: Minoresi
- Time zone: UTC+1 (CET)
  - Summer (DST): UTC+2 (CEST)
- Postal code: 84010
- Dialing code: 089
- Patron saint: Saint Trofimena
- Saint day: 5 November
- Website: Official website

UNESCO World Heritage Site
- Part of: Costiera Amalfitana
- Criteria: Cultural: (ii)(iv)
- Reference: 830
- Inscription: 1997 (21st Session)
- Area: 11,206 ha (27,690 acres)
- Buffer zone: 11,857 ha (29,300 acres)

Minori (Campanian: Minure; originally Rheginna Minor) is a comune on the Amalfi Coast in the Province of Salerno, Campania, southern Italy. Together with the other towns of the coast, it was inscribed as a UNESCO World Heritage Site in 1997.

A summer retreat of the Roman aristocracy, as attested by the remains of a patrician villa dating from the 1st century, the town today is a popular tourist destination known for its scenery and culinary tradition. For the latter it is sometimes called the "City of Taste" (Città del gusto), and for its mild climate the "Eden of the Amalfi Coast" (Eden della Costiera amalfitana).

== Etymology ==
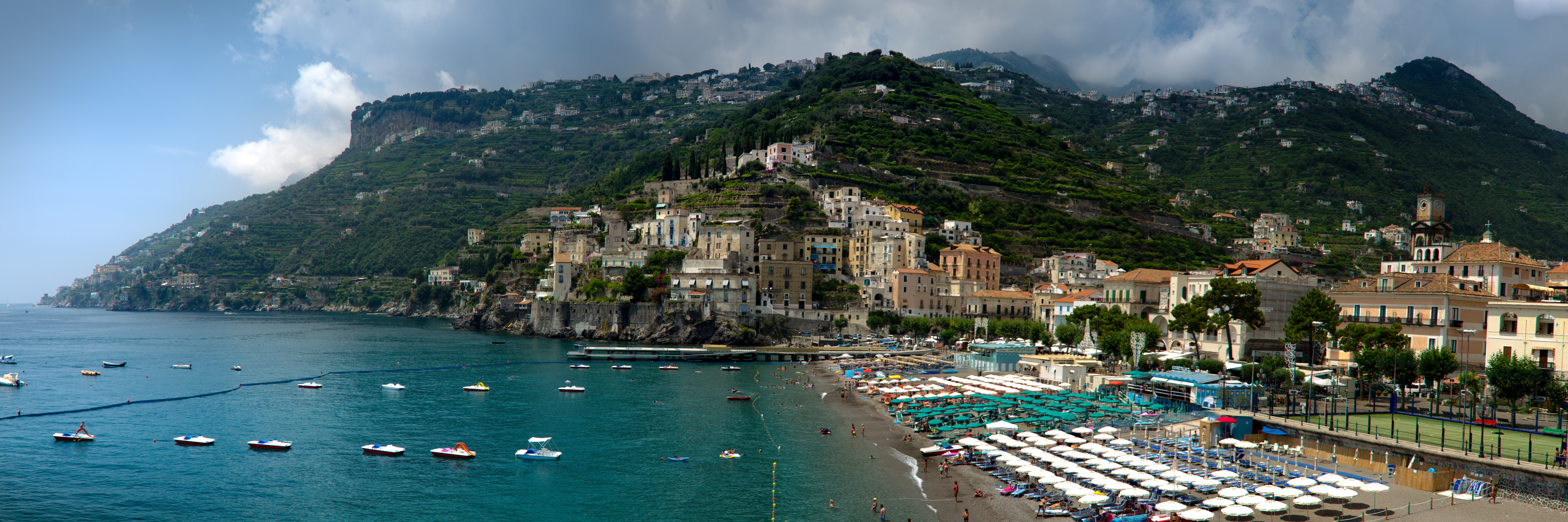
View of the beach of Minori

The town takes its name from the river that runs through it, the Reginna Minor, so called to distinguish it from the larger Reginna Maior of the neighbouring town of Maiori. The Latin adjectives minor and maior eventually replaced the river-name itself, becoming the modern toponyms Minori and Maiori. The origin of the older name Reginna is debated: local historians have variously proposed an Etruscan derivation, a Greek one with the sense of "rocky fissure", or a Latin one from regina, used in the Roman period to designate major routes of communication.

== History ==
=== Antiquity ===
Archaeological evidence shows that Minori is the oldest inhabited site on the Amalfi Coast. Beneath the flat ground of the modern town lies a maritime Roman villa of the 1st century AD, originally arranged on two floors, of which only the lower one survives. The villa, decorated with frescoes and mosaics, probably belonged to a member of the senatorial or equestrian patriciate and remained in use throughout the Julio-Claudian period. It was gradually abandoned and eventually buried by volcanic debris washed downstream after eruptions of Mount Vesuvius, with the original settlement disappearing from the historical record around the 4th century AD.

=== Middle Ages ===
Local tradition holds that the original settlement, located on the inland hill of Forcella, was abandoned in the 7th century, when the relics of Saint Trofimena were said to have been miraculously found on the underlying beach; the inhabitants then refounded the town along the shore, dedicating a church to the saint.

Throughout the Middle Ages, Minori shared the fortunes of Amalfi and the rest of the coast, falling first within the Byzantine Duchy of Naples and, after the Lombard raids of the 9th century, within the autonomous Duchy of Amalfi. In the winter of 838, the Lombard prince Sicard of Benevento sacked Amalfi and removed the relics of Saint Trofimena, which had been transferred to Amalfi from Minori in anticipation of the attack, to enshrine them in his own city; the relics returned permanently to Minori less than a year later, following Sicard's assassination. The town was created a suffragan diocese of Amalfi in 987 in recognition of the cult, and acquired the status of civitas in the 13th century. Despite this growth, Minori was repeatedly damaged by seaborne raids: it was attacked by the Saracen leader Boalim in the 10th century and sacked in 1135 by Pisan galleys during the Norman conquest of Amalfi.

=== Early modern period ===
Under Spanish viceregal rule the town strengthened its sea defences against incursions by Barbary pirates, including a raid by Hayreddin Barbarossa in the 16th century. The period was a difficult one: a violent storm on 11 April 1597 destroyed much of the town walls along the shore, the 1631 eruption of Vesuvius caused widespread damage, and the plague of 1656 killed 355 people out of a population of roughly 1,100. In 1799, during the short-lived Parthenopean Republic, Minori was "municipalised and democratised" by elements of the local bourgeoisie and clergy, who raised a liberty pole in the central square. The construction of the coastal road later known as the Amalfi Drive, begun in 1811 and completed in 1852, ended the centuries-old isolation of the Amalfi Coast.

=== Contemporary period ===
After the unification of Italy in 1860, Minori's traditional industries, in particular its paper mills and pasta workshops, entered a long decline. In September 1943, the town was one of the landing points of the Salerno landing: on 9 September the British X Corps under General Richard McCreery came ashore at Minori. On 25–26 October 1954, the town was struck by the Salerno flood: although less severely affected than the neighbouring villages, Minori lost three inhabitants and saw its two paper mills and mechanical workshop destroyed. The town was also affected by the 1980 Irpinia earthquake.

== Main sights ==
The Basilica of Santa Trofimena, the principal religious monument of Minori, holds the relics of the patron saint in its crypt; it was raised to the status of minor basilica in 1910. Saint Trofimena, venerated as an early Christian martyr, is at the centre of a local tradition: an urn containing her body, said to have been thrown into the sea, was drifted by the currents onto the beach at Minori, where two heifers carried it to the spot where the church was later built.

The Roman maritime villa, dating from the 1st century AD, was first uncovered between 1950 and 1954 and re-excavated after the 1954 flood. It follows the typical layout of a coastal Roman villa, with reception rooms to the west and thermal rooms to the east, and is annexed to an antiquarium displaying the finds from the site.

Other notable buildings include the church of San Giovanni a Mare, first attested in 961 and consecrated in 1144; the church of San Michele Arcangelo at Torre, documented from 1270; and the surviving bell tower of the demolished church of Santa Maria Annunziata, a rare example of Byzantine-Arab architecture from the 11th or early 12th century, visible from much of the coast. Among civil monuments, Torre Paradiso (completed 1595) was the tallest of the coastal watchtowers built to defend the town against Saracen raids.

== Cuisine ==
Minori is considered the gastronomic capital of the Amalfi Coast. It is the home of the ndunderi, one of the oldest forms of pasta still in production, as well as of distinctive shapes such as riccio and lagane. The local cuisine relies heavily on lemons, in particular the elongated sfusato amalfitano variety grown on the terraced groves of the coast, used both in savoury dishes and in the celebrated lemon pastries. The town is internationally known for its delizie al limone and for its ricotta and pear cake. Since 1997, the town has hosted Gusta Minori, an annual September festival combining food tastings, music and street performances.

== Twin towns ==
- Patti, Italy (since 2018)

== Transport ==
The nearest international airport is Naples International Airport (NAP); the smaller Salerno-Costa d'Amalfi Airport (QSR) also serves the area. The town lies on the SS 163 Amalfi Drive, its main road link.

== See also ==
- Amalfi Coast
- Roman Catholic Diocese of Minori
- Roman Villa of Minori
- Sorrentine Peninsula
