= Alessandro Cesarini (iuniore) =

Roman Catholic prelate (1592–1644)

Most Reverend Alessandro Cesarini
- Cardinal-Deacon of Sant'Eustachio; Bishop Emeritus of Viterbo e Tuscania
- Church: Catholic Church
- In office: 1638–1644
- Predecessor: Ippolito Aldobrandini (cardinal)
- Successor: Marzio Ginetti
- Previous posts: Cardinal-Deacon of Santa Maria in Domnica (1627–1632); Cardinal-Deacon of Santi Cosma e Damiano (1632–1637); Bishop of Viterbo e Tuscania (1636–1638); Cardinal-Deacon of Santa Maria in Cosmedin (1637–1638)

Orders
- Consecration: 25 May 1636 by Antonio Marcello Barberini
- Created cardinal: 30 August 1627
- Rank: Cardinal-Deacon

Personal details
- Born: 1592 Rome, Italy
- Died: 25 January 1644 (aged 52) Rome, Italy

Alessandro Cesarini, iuniore (1592 – 25 January 1644) was a Roman Catholic prelate who served as Cardinal-Deacon of Sant'Eustachio (1638–1644), Cardinal-Deacon of Santa Maria in Cosmedin (1637–1638), Bishop of Viterbo e Tuscania (1636–1638), Cardinal-Deacon of Santi Cosma e Damiano (1632–1637), and Cardinal-Deacon of Santa Maria in Domnica (1627–1632).

== Biography ==
Alessandro Cesarini was born in Rome, Italy in 1592, the son of Giuliano Cesarini, marquis of Civitanova e Montecorato, and Livia Orsini. His family produced a number of cardinals including his great-granduncle Cardinal Alessandro Cesarini, seniore (installed 1517); Giuliano Cesarini, seniore (installed 1426); and Giuliano Cesarini, iuniore (installed 1493). He attended the University of Parma and then obtained a doctorate in Rome. He served as papal prelate, Cleric of the Apostolic Chamber, and as the Governor of the conclave of 1623, in which Pope Urban VIII was elected.

On 30 August 1627, he was created as cardinal deacon in the consistory of 30 August 1627 by Pope Urban VIII and installed on 6 October 1627 as Cardinal-Deacon of Santi Cosma e Damiano On 6 September 1632, he was appointed Cardinal-Deacon of Santi Cosma e Damiano by Pope Urban VIII. On 14 May 1636, he was elected during the papacy of Pope Urban VIII as Bishop of Viterbo e Tuscania. On 25 May 1636, he was consecrated bishop at the Quirinale Palace in Rome by Antonio Marcello Barberini, seniore, with Fabrizio Suardi, Bishop of Lucera, and Benedetto Landi, Bishop of Fossombrone, serving as co-consecrators. On 9 February 1637, he was appointed during the papacy of Pope Urban VIII as Cardinal-Deacon of Santa Maria in Cosmedin. On 28 July 1638, he was appointed during the papacy of Pope Urban VIII as Cardinal-Deacon of Sant'Eustachio. On 13 September 1638. he resigned as Bishop of Viterbo e Tuscania. He died on 25 January 1644, in Rome. He was buried in the tomb of his family in the church of Santi Maria in Aracoeli in Rome.

== Episcopal succession ==
Episcopal succession of Alessandro Cesarini

While bishop, he was the principal consecrator of:

- Ludovicus Galbiati, Bishop of Acerno (1637);
- Marco Antonio Mandosio, Bishop of Nicastro (1637);
- Giulio Diotallevi, Bishop of Strongoli (1637);
- Francesco Boccapaduli, Bishop of Valva e Sulmona (1638);
- Antonio Marenzi, Bishop of Pedena (1638);
- Stefano Sauli, Archbishop of Chieti (1638);
- Diego Sersale, Archbishop of Bari-Canosa (1638);
- Enea di Cesare Spennazzi, Bishop of Sovana (1638);
- Pietro Paolo Medici, Bishop of Alife (1639);
- Giovanni Tommaso Perrone, Bishop of Nicastro (1639);
- Ippolito Andreassi, Bishop of Terni (1639);
- Carlo Diotallevi, Bishop of Strongoli (1639);
- Camillus Adriani, Auxiliary Bishop of Ostia-Velletri (1639);
- Francesco Arcudio, Bishop of Nusco (1639);
- Urbano Zambotti, Bishop of Montemarano (1640);
- Leonard Bondumier, Archbishop of Split (1641);
- Antonio Celli, Bishop of Isola (1641);
- Sebastiano Gentili, Bishop of Anagni (1642);
- Tommaso D'Avalos, Bishop of Lucera (1642);
- Maurizio Solaro di Moretta, Bishop of Mondovi (1642);
- Fabrizio Savelli, Archbishop of Salerno (1642);
- Bernardino Panicola, Bishop of Ravello e Scala (1643);
- Riginaldo Lucarini, Bishop of Città della Pieve (1643); and
- Alessandro Crescenzi (cardinal), Bishop of Termoli (1643).

Catholic Church titles
| Preceded by Carlo de' Medici | Cardinal-Deacon of Santa Maria in Domnica; 1627–1632 | Succeeded by Camillo Francesco Maria Pamphilj |
| Preceded by Agustín Spínola Basadone | Cardinal-Deacon of Santi Cosma e Damiano; 1632–1637 | Succeeded by Benedetto Odescalchi |
| Preceded by Tiberio Muti | Bishop of Viterbo e Tuscania; 1636–1638 | Succeeded by Francesco Maria Brancaccio |
| Preceded by Lelio Biscia | Cardinal-Deacon of Santa Maria in Cosmedin; 1637–1638 | Succeeded by Girolamo Colonna |
| Preceded by Ippolito Aldobrandini (cardinal) | Cardinal-Deacon of Sant'Eustachio; 1638–1644 | Succeeded by Marzio Ginetti |
