= Giambattista Altieri =

Italian Catholic cardinal

His Eminence Giovanni Battista Altieri
- Cardinal-Priest of Santa Maria sopra Minerva; Bishop of Todi
- Church: Catholic Church

Orders
- Consecration: 12 Mar 1624 by Scipione Caffarelli-Borghese

Personal details
- Born: 20 Jun 1589 Rome, Papal States
- Died: 26 Nov 1654 (age 65) Narni, Papal States

Giovanni Battista Altieri (20 June 1589 – 26 November 1654) was an Italian Catholic Cardinal.

== Early life ==
Giovanni Battista Altieri was born 20 June 1589 in Rome, the son of Lorenzo Altieri and Vittoria Delfin, a noble Venetian lady. Altieri was the older brother of Emilio Bonaventura Altieri who was elected to the papal throne as Pope Clement X in 1670.

He was educated in Rome and received a doctorate in theology and utroque iure.

== Ecclesiastic career ==
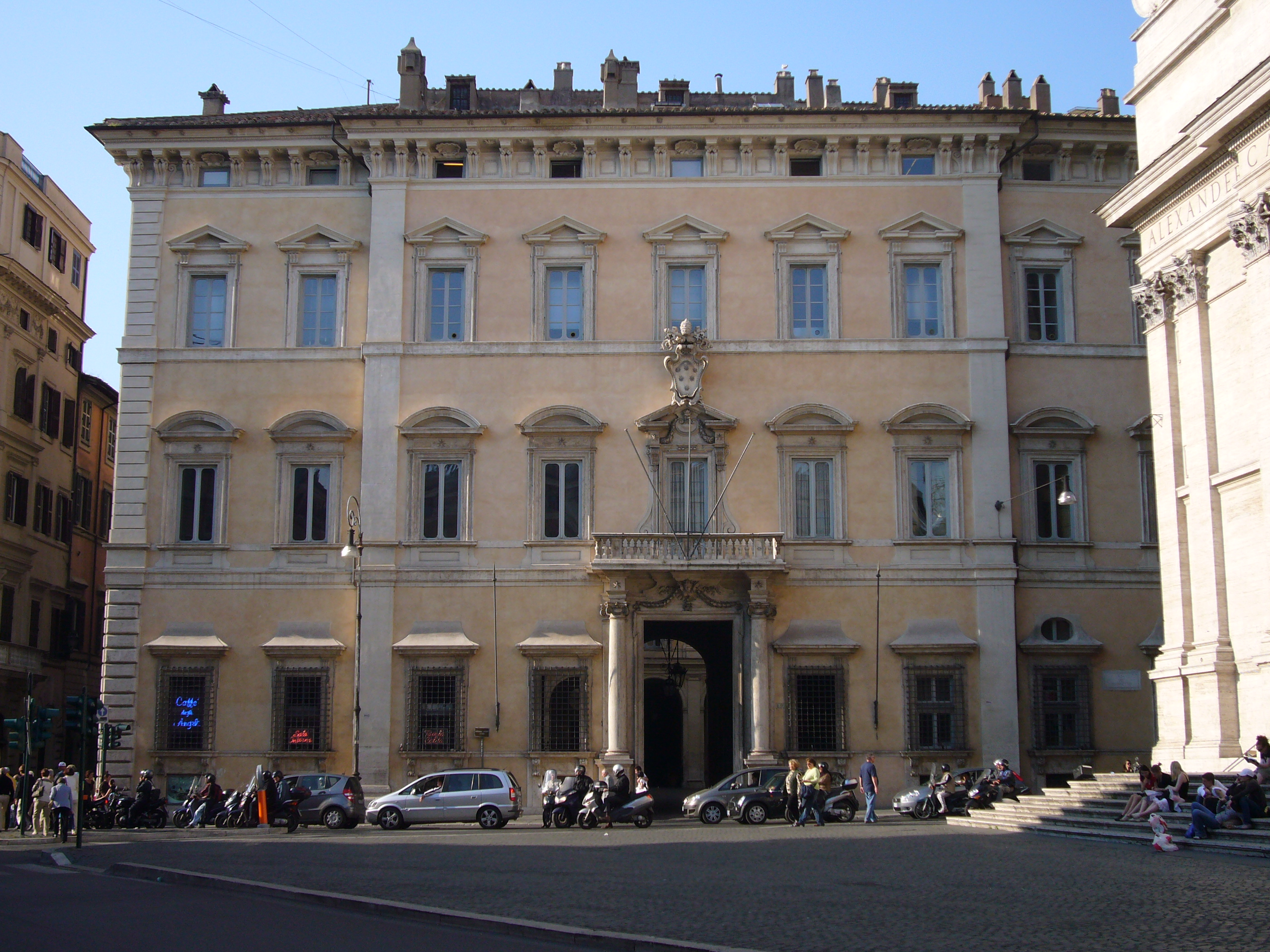
The Palazzo Altieri; commissioned by Giambattista Altieri.

He was ordained on 1 December 1613 and became a theologian of the patriarchal Vatican basilica.

In 1624, he was elected Bishop of Camerino and consecrated by Cardinal Scipione Borghese, Cardinal-Priest of San Crisogono, with Raffaele Inviziati, Bishop Emeritus of Cefalonia e Zante, and Vincenzo Landinelli, Bishop Emeritus of Albenga, serving as co-consecrators. He remained bishop of that diocese until he resigned to allow for his brother Emilio to be appointed. He became Custode del Sigillo of the Apostolic Penitentiary and an Apostolic visitor; travelling representative of the Holy See to at least six suburbicarian dioceses. In 1637, he was appointed Vice-Regent of Rome and held the position until 1643.

Altieri was elevated to cardinal by Pope Urban VIII on 13 July 1643 and was installed, the following month, as Cardinal-Priest of Santa Maria sopra Minerva. He also transferred to the Diocese of Todi. When Pope Urban died, Altieri participated in the Papal conclave of 1644 which elected Pope Innocent X.

== Death and burial ==
Altieri died on 26 November 1654 at Narni while travelling to Rome. News of his death reached Rome two days later. He was buried at the Altieri family chapel in the church of Santa Maria sopra Minerva.

== Episcopal succession ==
Episcopal succession of Giambattista Altieri

While bishop, he was the principal consecrator of:

- Augustinus Basrci (Bagesius), Titular Archbishop of Myra and Coadjutor Archbishop of Nachitschewan (1630);
- Ruggero Tritonio, Bishop of Poreč (1633);
- Marcello Cervini (bishop), Bishop of Sovana (1645);

and the principal co-consecrator of:

- Fabio Olivadisi, Bishop of Lavello (1626);
- Gerolamo Cappello, Bishop of Termoli (1626);
- Theodorus Pelleoni, Bishop of Montepeloso (1627);
- Emilio Bonaventura Altieri, Bishop of Camerino (1627);
- Loreto Di Franco (De Franchis), Bishop of Capri (1634);
- Martino Alfieri, Bishop of Isola (1634);
- Girolamo Magnesi, Bishop of Potenza (1634);
- Octavio Asinari, Bishop of Ivrea (1634);
- Alvise Marcello, Bishop of Šibenik (1635);
- Pietro Magri (bishop), Bishop of Policastro (1635);
- Camillo Melzi, Archbishop of Capua (1636);
- Pietro Gaudenzi (bishop), Bishop of Arbe (1636);
- Pietro Bellino, Bishop of Saluzzo (1636);
- Francesco Bianchi (bishop), Bishop of Sapë (1636);
- Ascanio Turamini, Bishop of Grosseto (1637);
- Pietro Paolo de' Rustici, Bishop of Telese o Cerreto Sannita (1637);
- Cristoforo Tolomei, Bishop of Sovana (1637);
- Marco Antonio Coccini, Bishop of Anglona-Tursi (1638);
- Felice Tamburelli, Bishop of Sora (1638);
- Giovanni Battista Carcarasio, Bishop of Città della Pieve (1638);
- Dionisio Bussotti, Bishop of Sansepolcro (1638);
- Fabio Magnesi, Bishop of Trevico (1638);
- Agostino Ferentillo, Bishop of Conversano (1638);
- Antonio del Pezzo, Bishop of Polignano (1638);
- Simone Carafa Roccella, Archbishop of Acerenza e Matera (1638);
- Juan Pastor, Bishop of Crotone (1638);
- Francesco Boccapaduli, Bishop of Valva e Sulmona (1638);
- Antonio Marenzi, Bishop of Pedena (1638);
- Diego Sersale, Archbishop of Bari-Canosa (1638);
- Enea di Cesare Spennazzi, Bishop of Sovana (1638);
- Girolamo Figini-Oddi, Bishop of Teramo (1639);
- Patrizio Donati, Bishop of Minori (1639);
- Girolamo Farnese, Titular Archbishop of Patrae (1639);
- Carlo Diotallevi, Bishop of Strongoli (1639);
- Camillus Adriani, Titular Bishop of Halmiros and Auxiliary Bishop of Ostia-Velletri (1639);
- Benedetto Cappello, Archbishop of Zadar (1639);
- Sebastiano Pisani (seniore), Bishop of Ceneda (1639);
- Silvestro D'Afflitto, Bishop of Trevico (1640);
- Giuseppe Ciantes, Bishop of Marsico Nuovo (1640);
- Urbano Zambotti, Bishop of Montemarano (1640);
- Francesco Romolo Mileti, Bishop of Segni (1640);
- Antonio Celli, Bishop of Isola (1641);
- Ascanio Cassiani, Bishop of Andria (1642);
- Giovanni Domenico Moroli, Bishop of Polignano (1642);
- Sebastiano Gentili, Bishop of Anagni (1642);
- Tommaso D'Avalos, Bishop of Lucera (1642);
- Pacifico Trasi (Trani), Bishop of Cagli (1642);
- Alessandro Sperelli, Titular Bishop of Orthosias in Caria and Auxiliary Bishop of Ostia-Velletri (1642);
- Giorgio Cornaro, Bishop of Padua (1642);
- Papirio Silvestri, Bishop of Macerata e Tolentino (1642);
- Giovanni Battista Sfondrati, Bishop of Pavia (1642);
- Bernardino Panicola, Bishop of Ravello e Scala (1643);
- Riginaldo Lucarini, Bishop of Città della Pieve (1643);
- Gaudenzio Poli, Bishop of Amelia (1643); and
- Giovan Battista Foppa, Archbishop of Benevento (1643).

Catholic Church titles
Preceded by Cesare Gherardi	Bishop of Camerino; 1624–1627	Succeeded by Emilio Bonaventura Altieri
Preceded by	Vice-Regent of Rome; 1637–1643	Succeeded by
Preceded by Giulio Roma	Cardinal-Priest of Santa Maria sopra Minerva; 1643–1654	Succeeded by Jean-François-Paul de Gondi de Retz
Preceded by Ulderico Carpegna	Bishop of Todi; 1643–1654	Succeeded by Gerolamo Lomellini
