= Giuseppe Labonia =

Bishop of Montemarano (1670–1720)

Most Reverend Giuseppe Labonia
- Bishop of Montemarano
- Church: Catholic Church
- Diocese: Diocese of Montemarano
- In office: 1670–1720
- Predecessor: Giuseppe Battaglia
- Successor: Giovanni Crisostomo Verchio

Orders
- Ordination: 24 September 1661
- Consecration: 23 November 1670 by Marcello Santacroce

Personal details
- Born: 6 November 1638 Rossano, Italy
- Died: 30 March 1720 (age 81) Montemarano, Italy

Giuseppe Labonia, O.A.D. (6 November 1638 – 30 March 1720) was a Roman Catholic prelate who served as Bishop of Montemarano (1670–1720).

== Biography ==
Giuseppe Labonia was born in Rossano, Italy on 6 November 1638 and ordained a priest in the Ordo Augustiniensium Discalceatorum on 24 September 1661. On 17 November 1670, he was appointed during the papacy of Pope Clement X as Bishop of Montemarano. On 23 November 1670, he was consecrated bishop by Marcello Santacroce, Bishop of Tivoli, with Alessandro Crescenzi (cardinal), Bishop Emeritus of Bitonto, and Ulisse Orsini, Bishop of Ripatransone, serving as co-consecrators. He served as Bishop of Montemarano until his death on 30 March 1720.

== External links and additional sources ==
- Cheney, David M. "Diocese of Montemarano". Catholic-Hierarchy.org. (for Chronology of Bishops) ^{[self-published]}
- Chow, Gabriel. "Titular Episcopal See of Montemarano (Italy)". GCatholic.org. (for Chronology of Bishops) ^{[self-published]}

Catholic Church titles
Preceded by Giuseppe Battaglia	Bishop of Montemarano; 1670–1720	Succeeded by Giovanni Crisostomo Verchio
