= Celso Zani =

Italian Roman Catholic prelate

Most Reverend Celso Zani
- Bishop of Città della Pieve
- Church: Catholic Church
- Diocese: Diocese of Città della Pieve
- In office: 1625–1629
- Predecessor: Fabrizio Paolucci (bishop)
- Successor: Sebastiano Ricci (bishop)

Personal details
- Born: 1580 Settimello, Italy
- Died: Unknown

Celso Zani, O.F.M., also Giuliano Zani (born 1580) was a Roman Catholic prelate who served as Bishop of Città della Pieve (1625–1629).

== Biography ==
Celso Zani was born in Settimello, Italy, and ordained a priest in the Order of Friars Minor. On 3 March 1625, he was appointed by Pope Urban VIII as Bishop of Città della Pieve, where he served until his resignation in 1629.

== Episcopal succession ==
While bishop, he served as the principal consecrator of:

- Jacques Lebret, Bishop of Toul (1645);

and the principal co-consecrator of:

- Antonio Brunachio, Bishop of Conversano (1632);
- Alessandro Gallo, Bishop of Massa Lubrense (1632);
- Agostino Oreggi, Archbishop of Benevento (1633);
- Benedetto Ubaldi, Bishop of Perugia (1634);
- Camillo Melzi, Archbishop of Capua (1636);
- Pietro Gaudenzi (bishop), Bishop of Arbe (1636);
- Niccolò Orsini (bishop), Bishop of Ripatransone (1636);
- Antonio Tornielli, Bishop of Novara (1637);
- Girolamo Lanfranchi, Bishop of Cava de' Tirreni (1637);
- Bernardino Scala, Bishop of Bisceglie (1637);
- Aegidius Ursinus de Vivere, Patriarch of Jerusalem (1641);
- Girolamo Verospi, Bishop of Osimo (1642);
- Giulio Gabrielli, Bishop of Ascoli Piceno (1642);
- Giulio Rospigliosi, Titular Archbishop of Tarsus and Apostolic Nuncio to Spain (1644);
- Nicolò Guidi di Bagno, Titular Archbishop of Athenae and Apostolic Nuncio to France (1644); and
- Taddeo Altini, Titular Bishop of Porphyreon (1646).

== External links and additional sources ==
- Cheney, David M. "Diocese of Città della Pieve". Catholic-Hierarchy.org. (for Chronology of Bishops) ^{[self-published]}
- Chow, Gabriel. "Diocese of Città della Pieve". GCatholic.org. (for Chronology of Bishops) ^{[self-published]}

Catholic Church titles
| Preceded by Fabrizio Paolucci (bishop) | Bishop of Città della Pieve; 1625–1629 | Succeeded by Sebastiano Ricci (bishop) |
