= Fabrizio Paolucci (disambiguation) =

Fabrizio Paolucci (1651–1726) was an Italian cardinal in the Roman Catholic Church.

Fabrizio Paolucci may also refer to:

- Fabrizio Paolucci (1726–1810), marquis (marchese) of the patrician Paolucci family
- Fabrizio Paolucci (bishop) (1565–1625), Roman Catholic prelate who served as Bishop of Città della Pieve
