= Paolucci =

Paolucci, also spelled Paulucci, and historically scarcely as Paoluzzi, Pauluzzi and Paluzzi is an Italian surname deriving from the given name Paolo (Paulus). It may refer to:

- Amilcare Paulucci (1773–1845), Italian admiral
- Adriano Paolucci (born 1979), Italian male volleyball player
- Andrea Paolucci (born 1986), Italian footballer.
- Anne Paolucci (1926–2012), Italian-American writer, scholar, and educator
- Antonio Palocci (born 1960), Brazilian politician
- Antonio Paolucci (1939–2024), Italian art historian and curator
- Ben Paolucci (born 1937), former American football defensive tackle
- Cristian Paulucci (born 1973), Argentine footballer
- Fabrizio Paolucci (bishop), (1565–1625), Roman Catholic prelate who served as Bishop of Città della Pieve
- Fabrizio Paolucci (1651–1726), Catholic cardinal
- Fabrizio Paolucci (1726–1810)
- Federico Paulucci (born 1990), Argentine footballer
- Gianfranco Paolucci (born 1934), Italian fencer
- Giuseppe Paolucci (1726–1776), Italian composer, conductor and organist of Baroque music
- Gustavo Paolucci (born 1954), Argentine field hockey player
- Henry Paolucci (1921/1922–1999), American professor and politician
- Jeno Paulucci (1918–2011), American businessman and entrepreneur
- Lorenzo Paolucci (born 1996), Italian football player
- Loris Paoluzzi (born 1974), Italian retired male hammer thrower
- Luciana Paluzzi (born 1937), Italian actress
- Marianna Paulucci (1835–1919), Italian naturalist
- Mario Paolucci (1941–2008), Argentine film actor
- Michele Paolucci (born 1986), Italian footballer
- Pauluccio Paulucci-Alberoni (fl. 1670–1676), Catholic cardinal and coadjutor to Pope Clement X
- Philip Osipovich Paulucci (1779–1849), Italian marquis, served in the Russian Army as adjutant general
- Roland Paolucci (born 1947), retired Swiss footballer
