= Niccolò Orsini =

Niccolò (also spelled Nicolò or Nicola) Orsini is the name of:

- Nicholas Orsini (died 1323), ruler of Cephalonia and Epirus
- Nicola Orsini, Count of Nola (1331–1399), senator of Rome, gonfalonier of the church
- Niccolò di Pitigliano (1442–1510), Italian condottiero and Captain-General of the Venetians
- Niccolò Orsini (bishop) (died 1653), Roman Catholic bishop
