= Fabrizio Suardi =

Roman Catholic prelate

Most Reverend Fabrizio Suardi
- Church: Catholic Church
- Diocese: Diocese of Caserta
- In office: 1637–1638
- Predecessor: Giuseppe della Corgna
- Successor: Antonio Ricciulli
- Previous post: Bishop of Lucera (1619–1637)

Orders
- Consecration: 10 February 1619 by Ladislao d'Aquino

Personal details
- Born: 1585 Naples, Italy
- Died: April 1638 (age 53) Caserta, Italy

Fabrizio Suardi or Alessandro Suardi (1585 – April 1638) was a Roman Catholic prelate who served as Bishop of Caserta (1637–1638) and Bishop of Lucera (1619–1637).

== Biography ==
Fabrizio Suardi was born in Naples, Italy in 1585. On 28 January 1619, he was appointed during the papacy of Pope Paul V as Bishop of Lucera. On 10 February 1619, he was consecrated bishop by Ladislao d'Aquino, Bishop of Venafro, with Paolo De Curtis, Bishop Emeritus of Isernia, and Scipione Spina, Bishop of Lecce, serving as co-consecrators. On 9 February 1637, he was appointed during the papacy of Pope Urban VIII as Bishop of Caserta. He served as Bishop of Caserta until his death in April 1638.

== Episcopal succession ==
While bishop, he was the principal co-consecrator of:

- Alexander Liparuli, Bishop of Guardialfiera (1624);
- Pier Luigi Carafa, Bishop of Tricarico (1624);
- Giovanni Battista Indelli, Bishop of San Marco (1624);
- Gaetano Cossa, Archbishop of Otranto (1635);
- Francesco Antonio Porpora, Bishop of Montemarano (1635);
- Ascenzio Guerrieri, Bishop of Castellaneta (1635);
- Cherubino Manzoni, Bishop of Lavello (1635);
- Bartolomeo Frigerio, Bishop of Venosa (1635);
- Francesco Antonio Sacchetti, Bishop of San Severo (1635); and
- Alessandro Cesarini (iuniore), Bishop of Viterbo e Tuscania (1636).

== External links and additional sources ==
- Cheney, David M. "Diocese of Lucera-Troia". Catholic-Hierarchy.org. (for Chronology of Bishops) ^{[self-published]}
- Chow, Gabriel. "Diocese of Lucera-Troi (Italy)". GCatholic.org. (for Chronology of Bishops) ^{[self-published]}

Catholic Church titles
Preceded by Lodovico Magio	Bishop of Lucera; 1619–1637	Succeeded by Bruno Sciamanna
Preceded by Giuseppe della Corgna	Bishop of Caserta; 1637–1638	Succeeded by Antonio Ricciulli
