= Giuseppe Battaglia =

Italian Roman Catholic prelate

Most Reverend Giuseppe Battaglia
- Bishop of Montemarano
- Church: Catholic Church
- Diocese: Diocese of Montemarano
- In office: 1657–1669
- Predecessor: Urbano Zambotti
- Successor: Giuseppe Labonia

Orders
- Consecration: 23 September 1657 by Ranuccio Scotti Douglas

Personal details
- Died: December 1669 Montemarano, Italy

Giuseppe Battaglia (died December 1669) was a Roman Catholic prelate who served as Bishop of Montemarano (1657–1669).

== Biography ==
On 9 July 1657, during the papacy of Pope Alexander VII, the appointment of Giuseppe Battaglia as Bishop of Montemarano was approved. On 23 September 1657, he was consecrated bishop by Ranuccio Scotti Douglas, Bishop Emeritus of Borgo San Donnino, with Patrizio Donati, Bishop Emeritus of Minori, and Gerolamo Bollini, Bishop of Isernia, serving as co-consecrators. He served as Bishop of Montemarano until his death in December 1669.

== External links and additional sources ==
- Cheney, David M. "Diocese of Montemarano". Catholic-Hierarchy.org. (for Chronology of Bishops) ^{[self-published]}
- Chow, Gabriel. "Titular Episcopal See of Montemarano (Italy)". GCatholic.org. (for Chronology of Bishops) ^{[self-published]}

Catholic Church titles
Preceded by Urbano Zambotti	Bishop of Montemarano; 1657–1669	Succeeded by Giuseppe Labonia
