= Francesco Antonio Porpora =

17th-century Italian Catholic bishop

Most Reverend Francesco Antonio Porpora
- Bishop of Montemarano
- Church: Catholic Church
- Diocese: Diocese of Montemarano
- In office: 1635–1640
- Predecessor: Eleuterio Albergone
- Successor: Urbano Zambotti

Orders
- Consecration: 13 May 1635 by Francesco Maria Brancaccio

Personal details
- Born: 1575 Naples, Italy
- Died: 1640 (age 65) Montemarano, Italy

Francesco Antonio Porpora (1575–1640) was an Italian Roman Catholic prelate who served as Bishop of Montemarano (1635–1640).

== Biography ==
Francesco Antonio Porpora was born in Naples, Italy in 1575. On 7 May 1635, he was appointed during the papacy of Pope Urban VIII as Bishop of Montemarano. On 13 May 1635, he was consecrated bishop by Francesco Maria Brancaccio, Cardinal-Priest of Santi XII Apostoli, with Giacomo Theodoli, Bishop of Forlì and Alessandro Suardi, Bishop of Lucera, serving as co-consecrators. He served as Bishop of Montemarano until his death in 1640.

Catholic Church titles
Preceded by Eleuterio Albergone	Bishop of Montemarano; 1635–1640	Succeeded by Urbano Zambotti
