= Zambotti =

Zambotti is an Italian surname. Notable people with the surname include:

- Urbano Zambotti (died 1657), Italian Roman Catholic prelate
- Vanessa Zambotti (born 1982), Mexican judoka
