= Gervasio Gestori =

Italian bishop (1936–2023)

The Most Reverend Gervasio Gestori
- Bishop Emeritus of San Benedetto del Tronto-Ripatransone-Montalto
- Metropolis: Fermo
- Appointed: 21 June 1996
- Term ended: 4 November 2013
- Predecessor: Giuseppe Chiaretti
- Successor: Carlo Bresciani

Orders
- Ordination: 28 June 1959 by Giovanni Battista Enrico Antonio Maria Montini
- Consecration: 7 September 1996 by Carlo Maria Martini

Personal details
- Born: 1 February 1936 Barlassina, Italy
- Died: 6 January 2023 (aged 86) Acquaviva Picena, Italy
- Motto: VERITAS ET CARITAS
- Coat of arms

Styles of Gervasio Gestori
- Reference style: His Excellency; The Most Reverend
- Spoken style: Your Excellency
- Religious style: Bishop

Gervasio Gestori (1 February 1936 – 6 January 2023) was an Italian Roman Catholic bishop.

Ordained to the priesthood on 28 June 1959, Gestori was named bishop of the Roman Catholic Diocese of San Benedetto del Tronto-Ripatransone-Montalto on 21 June 1996, and retired on 4 November 2013.

Catholic Church titles
Preceded by Giuseppe Chiaretti	Bishop of San Benedetto del Tronto-Ripatransone-Montalto; 1996–2013	Succeeded by Carlo Bresciani
