= Pietro Gaudenzi (bishop) =

Most Reverend Pietro Gaudenzi
- Church: Catholic Church
- Diocese: Diocese of Arbe
- In office: 1636–1664
- Predecessor: Theodorus Georgi
- Successor: Domnii Gaudenzi

Orders
- Consecration: 24 March 1636 by Faustus Poli

Personal details
- Died: 1664 Arbe, Croatia

Pietro Gaudenzi (died 1664) was a Roman Catholic prelate who served as Bishop of Arbe (1636–1664).

== Biography ==
On 3 March 1636, Pietro Gaudenzi was appointed during the papacy of Pope Gregory XIII as Bishop of Arbe. On 24 March 1636, he was consecrated bishop by Faustus Poli, Titular Archbishop of Amasea, with Giovanni Battista Altieri, Bishop Emeritus of Camerino, and Celso Zani, Bishop Emeritus of Città della Pieve, serving as co-consecrators. He served as Bishop of Arbe until his death in 1664.

While bishop, he was the principal co-consecrator of Thomas Marnavich, Bishop of Bosnia (1640).

Catholic Church titles
Preceded by Theodorus Georgi	Bishop of Arbe; 1636–1664	Succeeded by Domnii Gaudenzi
