= Jacques Lebret =

French Roman Catholic prelate

Most Reverend Jacques Lebret
- Bishop of Toul
- Church: Catholic Church
- Diocese: Diocese of Toul
- In office: 1645
- Predecessor: Paul Fieschi
- Successor: André du Saussay

Orders
- Consecration: 7 May 1645 by Celso Zani

Personal details
- Died: 15 June 1645 Toul, France

Jacques Lebret (died 1645) was a Roman Catholic prelate who served as Bishop of Toul (1645).

== Biography ==
Jacques Lebret was born in Paris, France. On 24 April 1645, Jacques Lebret was appointed during the papacy of Pope Innocent X as Bishop of Toul. On 7 May 1645, he was consecrated bishop by Celso Zani, Bishop Emeritus of Città della Pieve, with Ranuccio Scotti Douglas, Bishop of Borgo San Donnino, and Marco Antonio Coccini, Bishop of Anglona-Tursi, serving as co-consecrators. He served as Bishop of Toul until his death on 15 June 1645.

Catholic Church titles
Preceded by Paul Fieschi	Bishop of Toul; 1645	Succeeded by André du Saussay
