= Bernardino Panicola =

17th-century Italian Catholic bishop

Most Reverend Bernardino Panicola
- Bishop of Ravello e Scala
- Church: Catholic Church
- Diocese: Diocese of Ravello and Scala
- In office: 1643–1666
- Predecessor: Celestino Puccitelli
- Successor: Giuseppe Saggese

Orders
- Consecration: 1 January 1643 by Alessandro Cesarini (iuniore)

Personal details
- Born: 1581 Monticelli, Diocese of Tivoli, Italy
- Died: 10 November 1666 (age 85)

Bernardino Panicola or Bernardino Pannicola (1581 – 10 November 1666) was a Roman Catholic prelate who served as Bishop of Ravello e Scala (1643–1666).

== Biography ==
Bernardino Panicola was born in Monticelli, Diocese of Tivoli, Italy in 1581. On 15 December 1642, he was appointed during the papacy of Pope Urban VIII as Bishop of Ravello e Scala. On 1 January 1643, he was consecrated bishop by Alessandro Cesarini (iuniore), Cardinal-Deacon of Sant'Eustachio, with Giovanni Battista Altieri, Bishop Emeritus of Camerino, and Giuseppe della Corgna, Bishop of Squillace, serving as co-consecrators. He served as Bishop of Ravello e Scala until his death on 10 November 1666.

While bishop, Panicola was the principal co-consecrator of Francesco Barberini, Bishop of Sabina (1645).

== External links and additional sources ==
- Cheney, David M. "Diocese of Ravello e Scala". Catholic-Hierarchy.org. (for Chronology of Bishops) ^{[self-published]}
- Chow, Gabriel. "Titular Episcopal See of Ravello (Italy)". GCatholic.org. (for Chronology of Bishops) ^{[self-published]}

Catholic Church titles
Preceded by Celestino Puccitelli	Bishop of Ravello e Scala; 1643–1666	Succeeded by Giuseppe Saggese
