= Riginaldo Lucarini =

Roman Catholic prelate

Most Reverend Riginaldo Lucarini
- Bishop of Città della Pieve
- Church: Catholic Church
- Diocese: Diocese of Città della Pieve
- In office: 1643–1671
- Predecessor: Giovanni Battista Carcarasio
- Successor: Carlo Francesco Muti

Orders
- Consecration: 15 February 1643 by Alessandro Cesarini (iuniore)

Personal details
- Died: 8 October 1671 Città della Pieve, Italy

Riginaldo Lucarini, O.P. (died 1671) was a Roman Catholic prelate who served as Bishop of Città della Pieve (1643–1671).

== Biography ==
Riginaldo Lucarini was ordained a priest in the Order of Preachers. On 9 February 1643, he was appointed during the papacy of Pope Urban VIII as Bishop of Città della Pieve. On 15 February 1643, he was consecrated bishop by Alessandro Cesarini (iuniore), Cardinal-Deacon of Sant'Eustachio, with Giovanni Battista Altieri, Bishop Emeritus of Camerino, and Giovanni Battista Scanaroli, Titular Bishop of Sidon, serving as co-consecrators. He served as Bishop of Città della Pieve until his death on 8 October 1671. While bishop, he was the principal co-consecrator of Carlo Bonafaccia, Bishop of Ortona a Mare e Campli (1653); and Carlo Giuliani, Bishop of Stagno (1653).

== External links and additional sources ==
- Cheney, David M. "Diocese of Città della Pieve". Catholic-Hierarchy.org. (for Chronology of Bishops) ^{[self-published]}
- Chow, Gabriel. "Diocese of Città della Pieve". GCatholic.org. (for Chronology of Bishops) ^{[self-published]}

Catholic Church titles
Preceded by Giovanni Battista Carcarasio	Bishop of Città della Pieve; 1643–1671	Succeeded by Carlo Francesco Muti
