= Tommaso D'Avalos =

17th-century Italian Catholic bishop

Most Reverend Tommaso D'Avalos
- Church: Catholic Church
- Diocese: Diocese of Lucera
- In office: 1642
- Predecessor: Bruno Sciamanna
- Successor: Silvestro D'Afflitto

Orders
- Consecration: 30 March 1642 by Alessandro Cesarini (iuniore)

Personal details
- Born: March 1610 Pescara, Italy
- Died: 4 December 1642 (age 32) Lucera, Italy

Tommaso D'Avalos, O.P. or Tommaso de Avalos (1610 – 4 December 1642) was a Roman Catholic prelate who served as Bishop of Lucera (1642).

== Biography ==
Tommaso D'Avalos was born in Pescara, Italy in March 1610 and ordained a priest in the Order of Preachers. On 24 March 1642, he was appointed during the papacy of Pope Urban VIII as Bishop of Lucera (1642). On 30 March 1642, he was consecrated bishop by Alessandro Cesarini (iuniore), Cardinal-Deacon of Sant'Eustachio, with Giovanni Battista Altieri, Bishop Emeritus of Camerino, and Deodato Scaglia, Bishop of Melfi e Rapolla, serving as co-consecrators. He served as Bishop of Lucera until his death on 4 December 1642.

== External links and additional sources ==
- Cheney, David M. "Diocese of Lucera-Troia". Catholic-Hierarchy.org. (for Chronology of Bishops) ^{[self-published]}
- Chow, Gabriel. "Diocese of Lucera-Troi (Italy)". GCatholic.org. (for Chronology of Bishops) ^{[self-published]}

Catholic Church titles
Preceded by Bruno Sciamanna	Bishop of Lucera; 1642	Succeeded by Silvestro D'Afflitto
