= Urbano Zambotti =

Italian Roman Catholic prelate

Most Reverend Urbano Zambotti
- Bishop of Montemarano
- Church: Catholic Church
- Diocese: Diocese of Montemarano
- In office: 1640–1657
- Predecessor: Francesco Antonio Porpora
- Successor: Giuseppe Battaglia

Orders
- Consecration: 28 May 1640 by Alessandro Cesarini (iuniore)

Personal details
- Died: 1657 Montemarano, Italy

Urbano Zambotti, C.R. (died 1657) was a Roman Catholic prelate who served as Bishop of Montemarano (1640–1657).

== Biography ==
Urbano Zambotti was ordained a priest in the Congregation of Clerics Regular of the Divine Providence. On 21 May 1640, he was appointed during the papacy of Pope Urban VIII as Bishop of Montemarano. On 28 May 1640, he was consecrated bishop by Alessandro Cesarini (iuniore), Cardinal-Deacon of Sant'Eustachio, with Pietro Antonio Spinelli, Archbishop of Rossano, and Giovanni Battista Altieri, Bishop Emeritus of Camerino, serving as co-consecrators. He served as Bishop of Montemarano until his death in 1657.

== External links and additional sources ==
- Cheney, David M. "Diocese of Montemarano". Catholic-Hierarchy.org. (for Chronology of Bishops) ^{[self-published]}
- Chow, Gabriel. "Titular Episcopal See of Montemarano (Italy)". GCatholic.org. (for Chronology of Bishops) ^{[self-published]}

Catholic Church titles
Preceded by Francesco Antonio Porpora	Bishop of Montemarano; 1640–1657	Succeeded by Giuseppe Battaglia
