= Gualtiero Bassetti =

Italian Catholic archbishop

His Eminence Gualtiero Bassetti
- Cardinal; Archbishop emeritus of Perugia-Città della Pieve
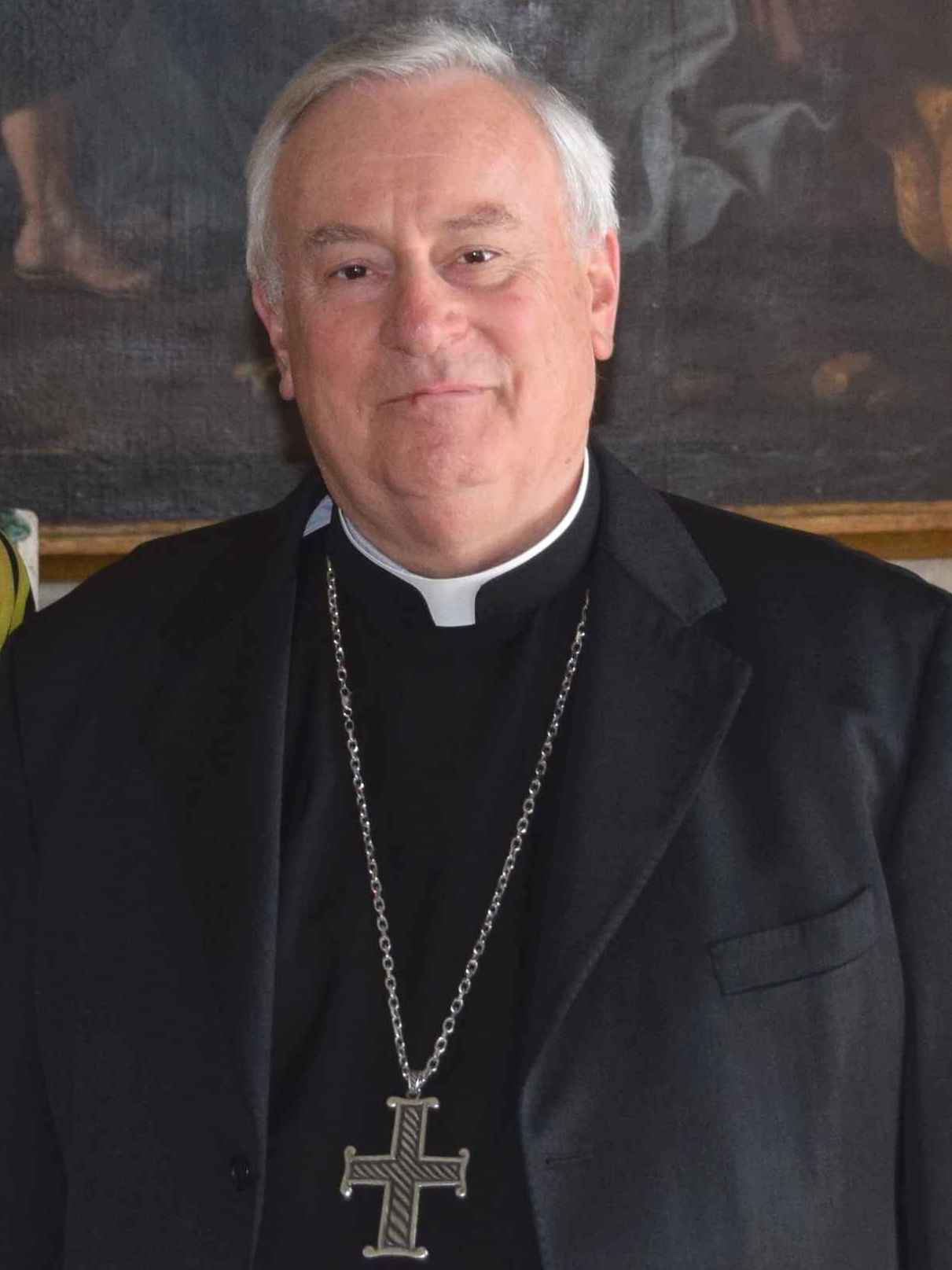
- Archdiocese: Perugia-Città della Pieve
- See: Perugia-Città della Pieve
- Appointed: 16 July 2009
- Installed: 4 October 2009
- Term ended: 27 May 2022
- Predecessor: Giuseppe Chiaretti
- Successor: Ivan Maffeis
- Other post: Cardinal-Priest of Santa Cecilia (2014–)
- Previous posts: Bishop of Massa Marittima-Piombino (1994–1998); Bishop of Arezzo-Cortona-Sansepolcro (1998–2009); Vice-President of the Italian Episcopal Conference (2009–2014); President of the Italian Episcopal Conference (2017–2022)

Orders
- Ordination: 29 June 1966 by Ermenegildo Florit
- Consecration: 8 September 1994 by Silvano Piovanelli
- Created cardinal: 22 February 2014 by Pope Francis
- Rank: Cardinal-Priest

Personal details
- Born: Gualtiero Bassetti; 7 April 1942 (age 84) Popolano di Marradi, Kingdom of Italy
- Denomination: Roman Catholic
- Motto: In Charitate Fundati (Grounded in Charity)
- Coat of arms: Gualtiero Bassetti's coat of arms

Ordination history of Gualtiero Bassetti
History
Episcopal consecration
- Principal consecrator: Silvano Piovanelli
- Co-consecrators: Antonio Bagnoli; Giovanni Bianchi
Cardinalate
- Elevated by: Pope Francis
Episcopal succession
Bishops consecrated by Gualtiero Bassetti as principal consecrator
- Giovanni Santucci: 5 December 1995
- Giuseppe Piemontese, OFM: 21 June 2014
- Nazzareno Marconi: 13 July 2015
- Paolo Giulietti: 10 August 2014
- Marco Salvi: 31 March 2019
- Giuseppe Baturi: 5 January 2020
- Ivan Maffeis: 11 September 2022

Styles of Gualtiero Bassetti
- Reference style: His Eminence
- Spoken style: Your Eminence
- Religious style: Cardinal
- Informal style: Cardinal

Gualtiero Bassetti (born 7 April 1942) is an Italian Catholic prelate who served as Archbishop of Perugia-Città della Pieve from 2009 to 2022. He has been a bishop since 1994 and was made a cardinal in 2014. He was president of the Italian Episcopal Conference from 2017 to 2022.

== Priest ==
Gualtiero Bassetti was born on 7 April 1942 in Popolano di Marradi. He attended the minor and major seminary of the archdiocese of Florence and was ordained a priest on 29 June 1966 in Florence. He served as vicar in the parish of St. Michael in San Salvi. In 1968 he became assistant at the minor seminary of Florence and then rector in 1972. Seven years later, he was subsequently appointed rector of the major seminary of Florence. He served there for 11 years and was then appointed pro-vicar and vicar general of the archdiocese.

== Bishop and archbishop ==
On 9 July 1994, he was appointed bishop of Massa Marittima-Piombino and consecrated on 8 September 1994 by Cardinal Silvano Piovanelli, Archbishop of Florence. He was named bishop of Arezzo on 21 November 1998. He was named the archbishop of Perugia-Città della Pieve on 16 July 2009.

He was elected head of the Catholic Bishops Conference of Umbria in 2012 and was appointed deputy president of the Italian Episcopal Conference.

== Cardinal ==
On 22 February 2014, Bassetti was raised to the rank of cardinal by Pope Francis. Bassetti commented in response: "My aims have not changed. I want to visit factories and hospitals, because as the Pope says, we must 'be pastors with the odor of sheep.' This is the time to roll our sleeves back." He also praised the Pope's nomination of Archbishop Loris Capovilla as "a direct reference the Second Vatican Council". La Stampa called it a "surprise nomination". It was the first time a bishop of Perugia had been named a cardinal since Gioacchino Pecci, later Pope Leo XIII, in 1853. His selection was seen, according to John L. Allen, as a demonstration of Francis' preference for "traditionally neglected locales" and for "political moderates". Another observer described him as "instantly papabile, a man cut from the same cloth as Francis". Giovanni Paciullo, Rector of the University for Foreign Students of Perugia, called the nomination a tribute to Bassetti's "constant concern for the least, the excluded, the foreigner ... which brought him into the paths of marginalization and suffering..."

Bassetti has celebrated Mass in Latin using the Missal promulgated by Pope John XXIII in 1962 and delivered homilies at such liturgies. Pope Francis named him a member of Congregation for Bishops, Congregation for the Clergy, and Pontifical Council for Promoting Christian Unity.

In 2016, at the request of Pope Francis, he authored the meditations for the Good Friday Way of the Cross service at the Colosseum.

On 23 May 2017, Pope Francis named Bassetti to a five-year term as head of the Italian Episcopal Conference (CEI). Bassetti's name was one of three presented to the Pope by the Conference membership and the one who had received the most votes from them. At the same time, he extended Bassetti's appointment as Archbishop of Perugia for five years despite the fact that Bassetti had submitted his resignation as required on his 75th birthday, a few weeks earlier. Opening the CEI's annual meeting on 25 September, Bassetti called for collegiality and dialogue between bishops and with the entire Church. He said he planned to end the practice of beginning the annual meeting with the president's address and would instead conclude the meeting by summarizing their debate and "seeking a point of equilibrium". As a starting point, he said Catholics could not be divided into those who prioritize personal morality and those who advocate for social justice. He spoke of the need to integrate migrants into Italian society, implying support for citizenship for those born in Italy. A reform of the tax system, he said, could support families, especially large ones, promote childbirth and provide employment.

Pope Francis named him a member of the Congregation for the Oriental Churches on 6 August 2019.

According to Vatican journalist Sandro Magister, Bassetti was resistant to Pope Francis's desire to convene a synod of the Church in Italy, leading to tension with the pope.

Pope Francis accepted his resignation as archbishop of Perugia on 27 May 2022.

== Health ==
After experiencing a fever, Bassetti tested positive for COVID-19 on 28 October 2020. He was admitted to Santa Maria della Misericordia Hospital in Perugia on 31 October, and was in the intensive care unit from the night of 2-3 November until 13 November; his condition remained critical. On 19 November, he was transferred to Rome's Agostino Gemelli University Policlinic to continue his convalescence.

== See also ==
- Cardinals created by Francis

Catholic Church titles
Preceded by Angelo Comastri	Bishop of Massa Marittima-Piombino; 9 July 1994 – 21 November 1998	Succeeded by Giovanni Santucci
Preceded by Flavio Roberto Carraro	Bishop of Arezzo-Cortona-Sansepolcro; 21 November 1998 – 16 July 2009	Succeeded by Ricardo Fontana
Preceded by Giuseppe Chiaretti	Archbishop of Perugia-Citta della Pieve; 16 July 2009 – 27 May 2022	Succeeded by Ivan Maffeis
Preceded by Carlo Maria Martini	Cardinal-Priest of Santa Cecilia in Trastevere; 22 February 2014 – present	Incumbent
Preceded by Angelo Bagnasco	President of the Italian Episcopal Conference; 23 May 2017 – 24 May 2022	Succeeded by Matteo Zuppi
