= Sebastiano Ricci (bishop) =

Most Reverend Sebastiano Ricci
- Bishop of Città della Pieve
- Church: Catholic Church
- Diocese: Diocese of Città della Pieve
- In office: 1630–1638
- Predecessor: Celso Zani
- Successor: Giovanni Battista Carcarasio

Personal details
- Born: 1569 Cingoli, Italy
- Died: 7 January 1638 (age 69) Città della Pieve

Sebastiano Ricci (1569 – 7 January 1638) was a Roman Catholic prelate who served as Bishop of Città della Pieve (1630–1638).

== Biography ==
Sebastiano Ricci was born in Cingoli, Italy in 1569. On 7 January 1630, he was appointed during the papacy of Pope Urban VIII as Bishop of Città della Pieve. He served as Bishop of Città della Pieve until his death on 7 January 1638.

== External links and additional sources ==
- Cheney, David M. "Diocese of Città della Pieve". Catholic-Hierarchy.org. (for Chronology of Bishops) ^{[self-published]}
- Chow, Gabriel. "Diocese of Città della Pieve". GCatholic.org. (for Chronology of Bishops) ^{[self-published]}

Catholic Church titles
Preceded by Celso Zani	Bishop of Città della Pieve; 1630–1638	Succeeded by Giovanni Battista Carcarasio
