= Ercole Tambosi =

Most Reverend Ercole Tambosi
- Bishop of Ravello
- Church: Catholic Church
- Diocese: Diocese of Ravello
- In office: 1555–1570
- Predecessor: Lodovico Beccadelli
- Successor: Paolo Fusco

Personal details
- Died: 1570 Ravello, Italy

Ercole Tambosi (died 1570) was a Roman Catholic prelate who served as Bishop of Ravello (1555–1570).

== Biography ==
On 19 Sep 1555, Ercole Tambosi was appointed during the papacy of Pope Paul IV as Bishop of Ravello. He served as Bishop of Ravello until his death in 1570.

== See also ==
- Catholic Church in Italy

== External links and additional sources ==
- Cheney, David M. "Diocese of Ravello e Scala". Catholic-Hierarchy.org. (for Chronology of Bishops) ^{[self-published]}
- Chow, Gabriel. "Titular Episcopal See of Ravello (Italy)". GCatholic.org. (for Chronology of Bishops) ^{[self-published]}

Catholic Church titles
Preceded by Lodovico Beccadelli	Bishop of Ravello; 1555–1570	Succeeded by Paolo Fusco
