= Francesco Boccapaduli =

Italian Roman Catholic prelate (1600–1680)

Most Reverend Francesco Boccapaduli
- Titular Archbishop of Athens
- Church: Catholic Church
- Diocese: Diocese of Città di Castello
- In office: 1647–1672
- Predecessor: Cesare Raccagna
- Successor: Giuseppe Maria Sebastiani
- Previous posts: Bishop of Valva e Sulmona (1638–1647); Bishop of Città di Castello (1647–1672); Apostolic Nuncio to Switzerland (1647–1652); Apostolic Nuncio to Venice (1652–1654)

Orders
- Ordination: 1623
- Consecration: 21 September 1638 by Alessandro Cesarini (iuniore)

Personal details
- Born: 3 April 1600 Rome, Italy
- Died: 23 November 1680 (age 80)

Francesco Boccapaduli (3 April 1600 – 23 November 1680) was a Roman Catholic prelate who served as Titular Archbishop of Athenae (1675–1680), Apostolic Nuncio to Venice (1652–1654), Apostolic Nuncio to Switzerland (1647–1652), Bishop of Città di Castello (1647–1672), and Bishop of Valva e Sulmona (1638–1647).

== Biography ==
Francesco Boccapaduli was born in Rome, Italy on 3 April 1600 and ordained a priest in 1623. On 13 September 1638, he was appointed Bishop of Valva e Sulmona by Pope Urban VIII.

On 21 September 1638, he was consecrated bishop by Alessandro Cesarini (iuniore), Cardinal-Deacon of Sant'Eustachio, with Tommaso Carafa, Bishop Emeritus of Vulturara e Montecorvino, and Giovanni Battista Altieri, Bishop Emeritus of Camerino, serving as co-consecrators.

On 6 May 1647, he was appointed Bishop of Città di Castello by Pope Innocent X.

On 14 September 1647, he was appointed Apostolic Nuncio to Switzerland by Pope Innocent X; he resigned from the post in September 1652.

On 24 August 1652, he was appointed Apostolic Nuncio to Venice by Pope Innocent X; he resigned from the post in 1654.

He served as Bishop of Città di Castello until his resignation on 1 October 1672. On 15 July 1675, he was appointed by Pope Clement X as Titular Archbishop of Athens (Greece), a title he held until his death on 23 November 1680.

== Episcopal succession ==
While bishop, he was the principal consecrator of:

- Thomas Henrici, Auxiliary Bishop of Basel and Titular Bishop of Chrysopolis in Arabia (1648);

and the principal co-consecrator of:

- Pietro Alberini, Titular Archbishop of Nicomedia (1674);
- Muzio Soriano, Archbishop of Santa Severina (1674); and
- Vincenzo Ragni, Bishop of Oppido Mamertina (1674).

== External links and additional sources ==
- Cheney, David M. "Diocese of Sulmona-Valva". Catholic-Hierarchy.org. (for Chronology of Bishops) ^{[self-published]}
- Chow, Gabriel. "Diocese of Sulmona-Valva". GCatholic.org. (for Chronology of Bishops) ^{[self-published]}
- Cheney, David M. "Diocese of Città di Castello". Catholic-Hierarchy.org. (for Chronology of Bishops) ^{[self-published]}
- Chow, Gabriel. "Diocese of Città di Castello". GCatholic.org. (for Chronology of Bishops) ^{[self-published]}
- Cheney, David M. "Nunciature to Switzerland". Catholic-Hierarchy.org. (for Chronology of Bishops) ^{[self-published]}
- Chow, Gabriel. "Apostolic Nunciature Switzerland". GCatholic.org. Archived from the original on October 21, 2015. (for Chronology of Bishops) ^{[self-published]}
- Cheney, David M. "Nunciature to Venice". Catholic-Hierarchy.org. (for Chronology of Bishops) ^{[self-published]}
- Cheney, David M. "Athenae (Titular See)". Catholic-Hierarchy.org. (for Chronology of Bishops) ^{[self-published]}

Catholic Church titles
Preceded by Francesco Cavaliere	Bishop of Valva e Sulmona; 1638–1647	Succeeded by Alessandro Masi
Preceded by Cesare Raccagna	Bishop of Città di Castello; 1647–1672	Succeeded by Giuseppe Maria Sebastiani
Preceded by Alphonse Sacrati	Apostolic Nuncio to Switzerland; 1647–1652	Succeeded by Jost Knab
Preceded by Scipione Pannocchieschi d'Elci	Apostolic Nuncio to Venice; 1652–1654	Succeeded by Carlo Carafa della Spina
Preceded by Carlo de' Vecchi	Titular Archbishop of Athenae; 1675–1680	Succeeded by Marcello d'Aste
