= Diocese of Arbe =

The Diocese of Arbe or Diocese of Rab or Diocese of Arba (Latin: Dioecesis Arbensis) was a Roman Catholic diocese located in the town of Arbe (modern day Rab) on the Croatian island of the same name located just off the Adriatic coast of northern Dalmatia, in Croatia, where still stands the former cathedral, dedicated to the Assumption of Mary.

== History ==
The diocese was ancient as it was founded no later than 532, and in the papal sway, originally as suffragan of the Metropolitan Archdiocese of Salona, later transferred to the ecclesiastical province of the Archdiocese of Spalato (later Salona, then Split, now Spalato-Macarsca).

On 17 October 1154 it became suffragan of the Metropolitan Archdiocese of Zara.

On 30 June 1828, while inner Dalmatia was part of the Austrian empire, the bishopric was suppressed by Pope Leo XII's papal bulla Locum Beati Petri, along with the Diocese of Ossero, and their territories merged into the Diocese of Veglia, also called the Diocese of Krk.

== Episcopal ordinaries ==
Suffragan Bishops of Arbe

- Tiziano (Titianus), in 532 attended the Council of Salona (now Split, Croatia)
- Pietro I (mentioned in 986)
- Maggio (in 1018)
- Dragone (before 1068 - till 1071)
- Pietro II (mentioned in 1072)
- Gregorio (in 1075)
- Domano ( circa 108)
- Vitale (Vitalis) (in 1086)
- Pietro III (in 1094)
- Lupo or Paolo (Paulus) † (circa 1097 - 1110)
- Bono (1111 – 1145)
- Andrea (1179? – 1193?)
- Prodano del Lauro (1205 – 1212)
- Venanzio (1216 – ?)
- Andrea (1220 – ?)
- Giovanni (1225 – 1225)
- Giordano (1225 – 1238)
- Paolo (1239 – 1243)
- Stefano de Dominis (1249 – 1258)
- Gregorio Ermolao (1260 – death 1289?)
- Matteo Ermolao I(1291? – 1292)
- Giorgio Ermolao I (1292 – death 1313)
- Aimone, Order of Saint Benedict (O.S.B.) (1313.01.13 – 1317?), previously Bishop of Oleno (peninsular Greece) (1310? – 1313.01.13)
- Francesco de Filippo (1321 – ?)
- Giorgio Ermolao II (1329 – death 1363)
- Crisogono de Dominis (1363.06.07 – 1372.07.14), next Bishop of Traù (Croatia) (1372.07.14 – 1403), Metropolitan Archbishop of Kalocsa (Hungary) (1403 – ? not possessed)
- Zodenigo Zodenighi (1372.11.03 – death 1412.01.06)
- Martino Carnota (Marino Carnota) (1414.02.11 – 1423.05.07), next Bishop of Traù (Trogir, Croatia) (1423.05.07 – 1424.12.11), Bishop of Trieste (Italy) (1424.12.11 – 1441)
- Francesco Servandi, Dominican Order (O.P.) (1423.05.07 – 1428.02.24); next Bishop of Koper (Slovenia) (1428.02.24 – death 1448.03.29)
- Angelo Cavazza (23 Feb 1428 - 7 Jan 1433), next Bishop of Poreč (Croatia) (1433.01.07 – 1440.04.11), Bishop of Traù (Trogir, Croatia) (1440.04.11 – death 1452.05)
- Jean de Parenzo (7 Jan 1433 - 11 April 1440), next Bishop of Poreč (Croatia) (1440.04.11 – 1457), Bishop of Cittanova (1442 – death 1448)
- Matteo Ermolao II (11 April 1440 - ?death ?1443), previously Bishop of Sapë (Albania) (1433.03.06 – 1440.04.11)
- Nicola da Zara, O.P. (24 July 1443 - death 1447), previously Bishop of Senj (Croatia) (1442.05.04 – 1443.07.24)
- Giovanni Scaffa (18 Sep 1450 - death ?1471)
- Leonello Chiericato (8 Jan 1472 - 19 Jan 1484), next Bishop of Traù (Trogir, Croatia) (1484.01.19 – 1488.10.22), Bishop of Concordia (Italy) (1488.10.22 – death 1506.08.19)
- Alonso Malumbra (19 Jan 1484 - death 1514)
- Vincenzo Negusanti (20 Nov 1514 - resigned 1567)
- Biagio Sideneo (1567.10.08 – death 1583.06.11)
- Andrea Cernota, Observant? Franciscans (O.F.M. Obs.) (1583.08.08 – death 1588)
- Pasquale da Padova, Camaldolese Benedictines (O.S.B. Cam.) (1588.09.19 – death 1621)
- Theodorus Georgi, Order of Saint Benedict (O.S.B.) (25 Oct 1621 - death 1635)
- Pietro Gaudenzi (bishop) (3 March 1636 - death 1664)
- Domnii Gaudenzi (9 June 1664 - death June 1695)
- Ottavio = Octavius Spader, Order of Friars Minor (O.F.M.) (28 Nov 1695 - 19 Dec 1698), next Bishop of Assisi (Italy) (1698.12.19 – death 1715.03.24)
- Antonio Rosignoli (30 March 1700 - 27 Nov 1713), next Bishop of Nona (now Nin, Croatia) (1713.11.27 – ?death)
- Vincenzio Lessio (11 Dec 1713 - 2 Oct 1719), next Bishop of Krk (Croatia) (1719.10.02 – ?)
- Doymus Zeni (6 May 1720 - March death 1728)
- Andrea Carlovich (15 Dec 1728 - death 12 Jan 1738)
- Pacifico Bizza (24 Nov 1738 - 17 Jan 1746), next Archbishop of Metropolitan Salona (now Split, Croatia) (1746.01.17 – death 1756)
- Giovanni Calebotta (14 June 1746 - 16 Feb 1756), next Bishop of Šibenik(Croatia) (1756.02.16 – death 1759.02.28)
- Giovanni Luca Garagnin (24 May 1756 - 5 June 1765), next Archbishop of Metropolitan Salona (now Split, Croatia) (1765.06.05 – death 1780.10.20)
- Giovanni Battista Jurileo (9 Dec 1765 - 29 July 1771), next Bishop of Nona (now Nin, Croatia) (1771.07.29 – death 1788)
- Giovanni Maria Antonio dall'Ostia (16 Dec 1771 - death 26 Oct 1794)
- Giovanni Pietro Galzigna (1 June 1795 - death 26 Dec 1823), previously Bishop of Traù (Trogir, Croatia) (1790.11.29 – 1795.06.01)

See suppressed: 30 June 1828

== Titular see ==
It was nominally restored in 1933 as Latin Titular bishopric of Arba (Latin = Curiate Italian) / Arbe / Arben(sis) (Latin adjective).

It has had the following incumbents, so far of the fitting Episcopal (lowest) rank :

- Paul Leonard Hagarty, O.S.B. (1950.06.25 – 1960.07.05) as last Apostolic Vicar of Bahama Islands (Bahamas) (1950.06.25 – 1960.07.05); next (see) promoted first Bishop of Nassau (Bahamas) (1960.07.05 – retired 1981.06.17); died 1984
- Edward Ernest Swanstrom (1960.09.14 – death 1985.08.10) first as Auxiliary Bishop of Archdiocese of New York (NY, USA) (1960.09.14 – retired 1978.04.04), then as emeritate
- Patricio Maqui Lopez (1985.10.16 – death 1991.02.20) as Auxiliary Bishop of Archdiocese of Nueva Segovia (Philippines) (1985.10.16 – 1991.02.20)
- Jan Pawel Lenga, Marian Fathers (M.I.C.) (Ukrainian) (1991.04.13 – 1999.07.07) as only 'permanent' Apostolic Administrator of Kazakhstan (Kazakhstan) (1991.04.13 – 1999.07.07); next (see) promoted only Bishop of Karaganda (Kazakhstan) (1999.07.07 – 2003.05.17), (personally) promoted again Archbishop-Bishop of Karaganda (2003.05.17 – retired 2011.02.05)
- Cyryl Klimowicz (1999.10.13 – 2003.04.17) as Auxiliary Bishop of Archdiocese of Minsk–Mohilev (Belarus) (1999.10.13 – 2003.04.17); later Bishop of Saint Joseph at Irkutsk (Russia) (2003.04.17 – ...) and Apostolic Administrator of Apostolic Prefecture of Yuzhno Sakhalinsk (Russia) (2003.04.17 – ...)
- Zacharias C. Jimenez (2003.06.11 – ...), first as Auxiliary Bishop of Diocese of Butuan (Philippines) (2003.06.11 – 2009.05.07), then on emeritate (2009.05.07 - ...); previously Bishop of Diocese of Pagadian (Philippines) (1994.12.02 – 2003.06.11).

== See also ==
- List of Catholic dioceses in Croatia
- Catholic Church in Croatia

== Sources and external links ==
- GCatholic - former & titular see
- GCatholic, with Google satellite photo - former cathedral
- Catholic-hierarchy.org - Diocese of Arbe (Rab)

Bibliography

- papal bulla 'Locum beati Petri', in Raffaele de Martinis, Iuris pontificii de propaganda fide. Pars prima, vol. IV, Rome 1891, p. 697
- Pius Bonifacius Gams, Series episcoporum Ecclesiae Catholicae, Leipzig 1931, pp. 394–395
- Konrad Eubel, Hierarchia Catholica Medii Aevi, vol. 1, p. 101; vol. 2, p. 92; vol. 3, p. 115; vol. 4, p. 91; vol. 5, p. 95; vol. 6, p. 95
