= Ivan Maffeis =

Italian Catholic archbishop (born 1963)

His Excellency, The Most Reverend Ivan Maffeis
- Archbishop of Perugia-Città della Pieve
- Church: Roman Catholic Church
- Province: Perugia
- See: Perugia-Città della Pieve
- Appointed: 16 July 2022
- Installed: 11 September 2022
- Predecessor: Gualtiero Bassetti

Orders
- Ordination: 26 Jun 1988
- Consecration: 11 September 2022 by Gualtiero Bassetti

Personal details
- Born: 18 November 1963 (age 62) Trento, Italy
- Denomination: Roman Catholic

Ivan Maffeis (born 18 November 1963) is an Italian prelate of the Catholic Church who has been the Archbishop of Perugia since 2022. After ordination to the priesthood, he spent twenty years working in his home diocese of Trento diving his time between pastoral work and journalism. He then moved to Rome and held various positions in the communications offices of the Italian Episcopal Conference for ten years. He worked briefly again in his home diocese until being appointed archbishop.

Styles of Ivan Maffeis
- Reference style: His Excellency; The Most Reverend
- Spoken style: Your Excellency
- Religious style: Archbishop

== Biography ==
Ivan Maffeis was born on 18 November 1963 in Pinzolo in the province of Trento. After completing his studies at the seminary in Trento, he was ordained a priest on 26 June 1988 for the Archdiocese of Trento.

He was parish vicar in Mori from 1988 to 1990 and then studied at the Salesian Pontifical University, completing his doctorate in social communication sciences in 1994. He then worked as parish priest in Trento from 1994 to 2000; seminary teacher from 1994 to 2009; diocesan assistant of Catholic Action from 2000 to 2002; director of the Vita Trentina diocesan weekly and of the diocesan radio, Radio Studio Sette in-Blu, from 2001 to 2009. For seven years he was national secretary of the Federation of Diocesan Weeklies (FISC).

He left Trento for Rome in 2010. He was deputy director of the Social Communications Office of the Italian Episcopal Conference (CEI) from 2010 to 2015 and its personnel manager from 2012 to 2020; director of the Social Communications Office from 2015 to 2019, and undersecretary of the CEI from 2015 to 2020. As director of social communications, he was the principal spokesperson for the CEI. In October 2013 he was also given responsibility for the CEI's film evaluation commission. On 12 April 2017 he was appointed to a five-year term as a consultor to the Dicastery for Communication. From 2010 to 2022 he was a lecturer at the Faculty of Communication Sciences of the Salesian Pontifical University and at the Pontifical Lateran University. Throughout his years in Rome, he often returned to Pinzolo to act the role of parish priest at sant'Antonio di Mavignola.

After leaving the CEI in 2020, he returned to the Diocese of Trento and worked as a parish priest serving the communities of Rovereto, Trambileno, Vanza, Noriglio, and Terragnolo, based at the parishes of San Marco and Sacra Famiglia.

On 16 July 2022, Pope Francis appointed him Archbishop of Perugia. He was consecrated and installed in Perugia on 11 September 2022.

Catholic Church titles
Preceded by Gualtiero Bassetti	Archbishop of Perugia-Citta della Pieve; 2022 - present	Incumbent
