= Lodovico Magio =

Italian Roman Catholic prelate

Most Reverend Lodovico Magio
- Bishop of Lucera
- Church: Catholic Church
- In office: 1609–1618
- Predecessor: Fabio Aresti
- Successor: Alessandro Suardi

Orders
- Ordination: 1599
- Consecration: 10 May 1609 by Giovanni Garzia Mellini

Personal details
- Born: 1564 Milan, Italy
- Died: 1618 (age 54) Lucera, Italy

Lodovico Magio (1564–1618) was a Roman Catholic prelate who served as Bishop of Lucera (1609–1618).

== Biography ==
Lodovico Magio was born in Milan, Italy in 1564 and ordained a priest in 1599.

On 29 April 1609, he was appointed Bishop of Lucera by Pope Paul V (Borghese). On 10 May 1609, he was consecrated bishop by Giovanni Garzia Mellini, Bishop of Imola, with Galeazzo Sanvitale, Archbishop Emeritus of Bari-Canosa, and Ulpiano Volpi, Archbishop of Chieti, serving as co-consecrators.

He served as Bishop of Lucera until his death in 1618.

== External links and additional sources ==
- Cheney, David M. "Diocese of Lucera-Troia". Catholic-Hierarchy.org. (for Chronology of Bishops) ^{[self-published]}
- Chow, Gabriel. "Diocese of Lucera-Troi (Italy)". GCatholic.org. (for Chronology of Bishops) ^{[self-published]}

Catholic Church titles
Preceded by Fabio Aresti	Bishop of Lucera; 1609–1618	Succeeded by Alessandro Suardi
