= Giuseppe Chiaretti =

Italian archbishop (1933–2021)

- Archbishop of Perugia–Città della Pieve
- Church: Catholic Church
- Archdiocese: Archdiocese of Perugia–Città della Pieve
- In office: 9 December 1995 – 16 July 2009
- Predecessor: Ennio Antonelli
- Successor: Gualtiero Bassetti
- Previous posts: Bishop of San Benedetto del Tronto-Ripatransone-Montalto (1986-1995); Bishop of Montalto-San Benedetto del Tronto-Ripatransone (1983-1986)

Orders
- Ordination: 8 December 1955 by Raffaele Mario Radossi
- Consecration: 15 May 1983 by Sebastiano Baggio

Personal details
- Born: 19 April 1933 Leonessa, Province of Rieti, Kingdom of Italy
- Died: 2 December 2021 (aged 88) Perugia, Italy

Giuseppe Chiaretti (19 April 1933 – 2 December 2021) was an Italian Roman Catholic prelate. He was archbishop of Perugia–Città della Pieve (1995–2009).

Chiaretti was ordained a priest on 8 December 1955. From 1983 to 1986, he was bishop of Ripatransone-San Benedetto del Tronto and of Montalto. In 1986, both Dioceses were united to the Diocese of San Benedetto del Tronto-Ripatransone-Montalto. On 9 December 1995, Chiaretti was appointed archbishop of Perugia-Città della Pieve. He held this post until his retirement on 16 July 2009.
