= Onorio de Verme =

Most Reverend Onorio de Verme
- Bishop of Ravello e Scala
- Church: Catholic Church
- Diocese: Diocese of Ravello e Scala
- In office: 1624–1637
- Predecessor: Michele Bonzi
- Successor: Celestino Puccitelli

Orders
- Consecration: 11 August 1624 by Giovanni Garzia Mellini

Personal details
- Born: 1588 Palermo, Italy
- Died: 1637 (aged 48–49)

Onorio de Verme or Honuphrius a Verme (1588–1637) was a Roman Catholic prelate who served as Bishop of Ravello e Scala (1624–1637).

== Biography ==
Onorio de Verme was born in Palermo, Italy in 1588. On 29 July 1624, he was appointed during the papacy of Pope Urban VIII as Bishop of Ravello e Scala. On 11 August 1624, he was consecrated bishop by Giovanni Garzia Mellini, Cardinal-Priest of Santi Quattro Coronati, with Antonio Provana, Archbishop of Durrës, and Charles Bobba de Montferrat, Bishop of Saint-Jean-de-Maurienne, serving as co-consecrators. He served as Bishop of Ravello e Scala until his death in 1637.

== Sources and external links ==
- Mansi, Luigi (1887). Ravello sacra-monumentale. (in Italian). Ravello: Zimi di Milano, 1887.
- Cheney, David M. "Diocese of Ravello e Scala". Catholic-Hierarchy.org. (for Chronology of Bishops) ^{[self-published]}
- Chow, Gabriel. "Titular Episcopal See of Ravello (Italy)". GCatholic.org. (for Chronology of Bishops) ^{[self-published]}

Catholic Church titles
Preceded by Michele Bonzi	Bishop of Ravello e Scala; 1624–1637	Succeeded by Celestino Puccitelli
