= Marco Salvi =

Italian Catholic Bishop

- Auxiliary Bishop of Perugia–Città della Pieve
- Archdiocese: Perugia–Città della Pieve
- Appointed: 15 February 2019
- Other post: Titular bishop of Termini Imerese

Orders
- Ordination: 28 May 1983 by Giovanni Telesforo Cioli
- Consecration: 31 March 2019 by Gualtiero Bassetti

Personal details
- Born: April 4, 1954 Sansepolcro, Italy
- Occupation: Architect and prelate
- Coat of arms

Marco Salvi (born 4 April 1954) is an Italian prelate of the Catholic Church who has been auxiliary bishop of Perugia–Città della Pieve since 2019.

== Biography ==
Marco Salvi was born in Sansepolcro in the province of Arezzo on 4 April 1954. He studied at the University of Florence, earning a degree in architecture and civil engineering in 1979. He qualified as a registered architect in 1991. During his university studies he grew attached to the Communion and Liberation movement.

In 1978 he began studying for the priesthood at the seminary of Arezzo. He completed a bachelor's degree in theology at the Theological Seminary-Faculty of Florence. He also earned a diploma magna cum laude from the Pontifical Gregorian University. On 28 May 1983 he was ordained a priest for the diocese of Sansepolcro by Giovanni Telesforo Cioli, who had recently retired as bishop of three dioceses: Arezzo, Cortona, and Sansepolcro.

He was parish priest of Galbino in Anghiari, a hill town in the province of Arezzo, from 1983 to 1984 and of Tavernelle in Anghiari from 1984 to 1999. From 1999 to 2019 he was parish priest of San Bartolomeo in Anghiari and coordinator of pastoral unity. From 1999 to 2019 he worked as an architect-engineer for the renovation of sacred buildings. He also taught art history in the high schools of Arezzo from 1985 to 1995. He was also rector of the diocesan sanctuary of the Madonna del Carmine beginning in 1991. He was twice appointed president of the diocesan Institute for the Support of the Clergy, serving from 1993 to 2005.

On 15 February 2019, Pope Francis appointed him auxiliary bishop of Perugia-Città della Pieve and titular bishop of Termini Imerese.

He received his episcopal consecration in Arezzo on 31 March from Cardinal Gualtiero Bassetti, archbishop of Perugia, assisted by Cardinal Francesco Coccopalmerio and Riccardo Fontana, bishop of Arezzo.

In mid-March 2019, he was named secretary of the Bishops Conference of Umbria and president of the network of Umbrian church museums.
