= Niccolò Orsini (bishop) =

Italian Roman Catholic prelate

Most Reverend Niccolò Orsini
- Bishop of Ripatransone
- Church: Catholic Church
- Diocese: Diocese of Ripatransone
- In office: 1636–1653
- Predecessor: Antonio Arrigoni
- Successor: Ulisse Orsini

Orders
- Consecration: 28 September 1636 by Giovanni Battista Maria Pallotta

Personal details
- Died: 18 October 1653 Ripatransone, Italy

Niccolò Orsini (died 18 October 1653) was a Roman Catholic prelate who served as Bishop of Ripatransone (1636–1653).

== Biography ==
On 22 September 1636, Niccolò Orsini was appointed Bishop of Ripatransone by Pope Urban VIII. On 28 September 1636, he was consecrated bishop by Giovanni Battista Maria Pallotta, Cardinal-Priest of San Silvestro in Capite, with Celso Zani, Bishop Emeritus of Città della Pieve, and Giovanni Battista Scanaroli, Titular Bishop of Sidon, serving as co-consecrators.

He served as Bishop of Ripatransone until his death on 18 October 1653.

Catholic Church titles
Preceded by Antonio Arrigoni	Bishop of Ripatransone; 1636–1653	Succeeded by Ulisse Orsini
