= Camillus Adriani =

Roman Catholic prelate

Most Reverend Camillus Adriani
- Auxiliary Bishop of Ostia-Velletri; Titular Bishop of Halmiros
- Church: Catholic Church
- In office: 1639–1650?
- Predecessor: Otto Heinrich Pachmair
- Successor: Sebastian Denich

Orders
- Consecration: 22 May 1639 by Alessandro Cesarini (iuniore)

Camillus Adriani was a Roman Catholic prelate who served as Auxiliary Bishop of Ostia-Velletri (1639–?) and Titular Bishop of Halmiros (1639–?).

== Biography ==
On 16 May 1639, Camillus Adriani was appointed during the papacy of Pope Urban VIII as Auxiliary Bishop of Ostia-Velletri and Titular Bishop of Halmiros. On 22 May 1639, he was consecrated bishop by Alessandro Cesarini (iuniore), Cardinal-Deacon of Sant'Eustachio, with Lelio Falconieri, Titular Archbishop of Thebae, and Giovanni Battista Altieri, Bishop Emeritus of Camerino, serving as co-consecrators. it is uncertain how long he served; the next Titular Bishop of Halmiros was Sebastian Denich who was appointed in 1650.

Catholic Church titles
Preceded by Otto Heinrich Pachmair	Titular Bishop of Halmiros; 1639–1650?	Succeeded by Sebastian Denich
Preceded by -	Auxiliary Bishop of Ostia-Velletri; 1639–1650?	Succeeded by -
