= Archdiocese of Perugia–Città della Pieve =

Latin Catholic archdiocese in Italy

Archdiocese of Perugia-Città della Pieve Archidioecesis Perusina-Civitatis Plebis

Catholic
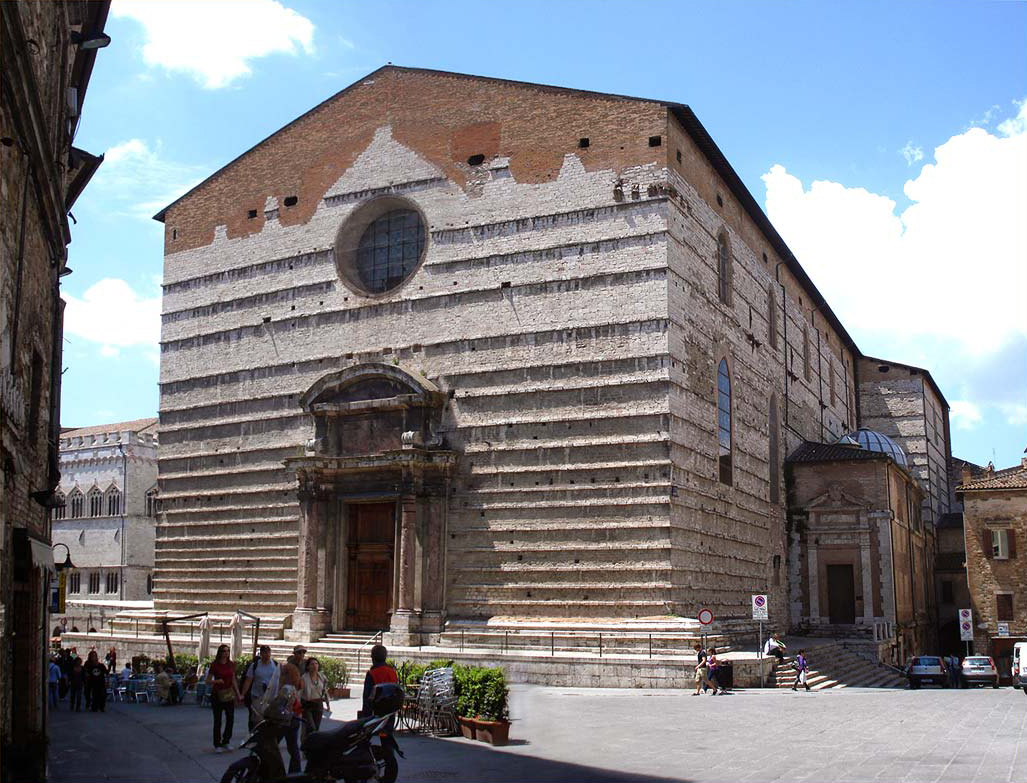
- Perugia Cathedral

Location
- Country: Italy
- Ecclesiastical province: Perugia-Città della Pieve
- Coordinates: 43.1125°N 12.3891°E

Statistics
- Area: 1,900 km^{2} (730 sq mi)
- Population: Total; Catholics: (as of 2013); 286,645; 256,000 (89.3%)
- Parishes: 154

Information
- Denomination: Catholic Church
- Sui iuris church: Latin Church
- Rite: Roman Rite
- Established: 2nd century
- Cathedral: Perugia Cathedral
- Co-cathedral: Città della Pieve Cathedral
- Secular priests: 119 (diocesan); 76 (Religious Orders)

Current leadership
- Pope: Leo XIV
- Metropolitan Archbishop: Ivan Maffeis
- Auxiliary Bishops: Marco Salvi
- Bishops emeritus: Gualtiero Bassetti

Website
- www.diocesi.perugia.it

The Archdiocese of Perugia-Città della Pieve (Latin: Archidioecesis Perusina-Civitatis Plebis) is a Latin archdiocese of the Catholic Church. It was historically the Diocese of Perugia. It became the Archdiocese of Perugia in 1882, but without suffragans. It acquired suffragan dioceses in 1972. It was united in 1986 with the Diocese of Città della Pieve. The Current Archbishop is Ivan Maffeis

== History ==
In the martyrologies are found the names of the martyrs Constantius (Constantinus, whom some believe to have been a bishop), Florentius, and Felicissimus, who died at Perugia. Under the Emperor Decius one Decentius was bishop, according to the tradition; but the first bishop of whom there is any certain knowledge was St. Herculanus, killed by King Totila in 546; many admit there were two bishops and saints of this name, of whom the first is said to have died either in one of the great persecutions or under Julian the Apostate (Cappelletti).

Notable successors of St. Herculanus:

- Joannes, who consecrated Pope Pelagius I (566)
- Aventius (591)
- Laurentius (649)
- Benenatus (679))
- St. Asclepiodorus (about 700), whose relics were later taken to Metz
- Conon (998) and Andreas (1033), who had various controversies with the abbots of San Pietro
- Joannes (1105), who consecrated the monastery of Monte Corona
- Vivianus, who was present at the council of 1179
- Giovanni (1206), who gave a convent to St. Francis
- Salvio de' Salvi (1231), a learned prelate, who restored Santo Stefano, the ancient cathedral
- Francesco Poggi, O. Min. (1312), who built S. Domenico nuovo
- Andrea Bontempi (1339), a cardinal, and legate general of Umbria
- Andrea Giovanni Baglione (1434), who filled several convents with reformed religious
- Dionisio Vannucci (1482), who erected the altar of the chapel del Sacro Anello
- Giovanni Lopez (1492), a cardinal who enjoyed influence under Pope Alexander VI
- Trilo Baglione (1501), deposed by Alexander VI for having taken up arms against Cesare Borgia and restored to his see by Pope Julius II
- Antonio Ferreri (1506), who suspected by Julius II died in the Castle of S. Angelo in 1508
- Cardinal Agostino Spinola (1510), under whom the canons of the cathedral, who since the twelfth century had lived according to the Rule of St. Augustine, were relieved of that rule
- Giacomo Simoneta (1535), a cardinal
- Fulvio Corneo (1550), reformer of the diocese and founder of the seminary
- Ippolito Corneo (1553), who established a house of reform, and a monastery for poor young men
- Giulio Oradini (1562), who founded a college for clerks
- Napoleone Comitoli (1591), the founder of other charitable institutions
- M. Ant. Ausidei (1726), who embellished the cathedral
- Alessandro M. Odoardi (1776), a zealous prelate, who discovered the body of St. Costanzo
- Camillo Campanelli (1804), who took the oath of allegiance to Napoleon
- Carlo Filesio Cittadini (1818), against the Provisional Government of 1831, who saved the city from pillage at that time
- Gioacchino Pecci (1846), who became Pope Leo XIII, and who made Perugia an archdiocese without suffragans

== Ordinaries ==
=== Diocese of Perugia ===
Erected in the 2nd century with the Latin name Dioecesis Perusina

- Agostino da Lanzano (29 Oct 1390 – 27 Feb 1404 Appointed, Bishop of Spoleto)
- ...
- Juan López (cardinal) (29 Dec 1492 – 15 Oct 1498 Appointed, Archbishop of Capua)
- Troilo Baglioni (27 Aug 1501 – 4 Aug 1503 (resigned))
- Francisco de Remolins (4 Aug 1503 – Mar 1506 (resigned))
- Antonio Ferrero (30 Mar 1506 – 23 Jul 1508 (died))
- Matteo Baldeschi (degli Ubaldi) (28 Jul 1508 – Dec 1509 (died))
- Agostino Spínola (19 Dec 1509 – 15 Feb 1529 (resigned))
- Carlo Spinola (15 Feb 1529 – 15 Nov 1535 (died))
- Giacomo Simonetta (20 Dec 1535 – 20 Jul 1538 (resigned))
- Francesco Bernardino Simonetta (29 Jul 1538 – 1550 (died))
- Fulvio Giulio della Corgna, O.S.Io.Hieros. (5 Mar 1550 – 22 Mar 1553 (resigned))
- Ippolito della Corgna (22 Mar 1553 – 1562 (resigned))
- Giulio Oradini (17 Apr 1562 – 10 Sep 1564 (resigned))
- Fulvio Giulio della Corgna, O.S.Io.Hieros. (6 Sep 1564 – 5 May 1574 (resigned))
- Francesco Bossi (5 May 1574 – 21 Oct 1579 Appointed, Bishop of Novara)
- Vincenzo Ercolano, O.P. (27 Nov 1579 – 29 Oct 1586 (died))
- Antonio Maria Gallo (5 Nov 1586 – 19 Jul 1591 Appointed, Bishop of Osimo)
- Napoleone Comitoli (19 Jul 1591 – 30 Aug 1624 (died))
- Cosimo de Torres (16 Sep 1624 – 3 Apr 1634 (appointed Archbishop of Monreale))
- Benedetto Ubaldi (2 Apr 1634 – 14 Dec 1643 (resigned)), cardinal
- Orazio Monaldi (14 Dec 1643 – Dec 1656 (died))
- Marcantonio Oddi (23 Jun 1659 – 24 Feb 1668 (died))
- Lucalberto Patrizi (3 Jun 1669 – 29 Aug 1701 (died))
- Antonio Felice Marsili (5 Dec 1701 – 5 Jul 1710 (died))
- Vitale Giuseppe de' Buoi (23 Feb 1711 – 23 Nov 1726 (died))
- Marco Antonio Ansidei (16 Dec 1726 – 14 Feb 1730 (died))
- Francesco Riccardo Ferniani (11 Dec 1730 – 25 Aug 1762 (died))
- Filippo Amadei (22 Nov 1762 – 9 Aug 1775 (died))
- Alessandro Maria Odoardi (29 Jan 1776 – 2 Feb 1805 (died))
- Camillo Campanelli (23 Sep 1805 – 30 Jul 1818 (died))
- Carlo Filesio Cittadini (2 Oct 1818 – 16 Apr 1845 (died))
- Gioacchino Vincenzo Raffaele Luigi Pecci, Archbishop (personal title), cardinal (in 1853) (19 Jan 1846 – 27 Feb 1880 (resigned upon election as Pope Leo XIII in 1878))
- Federico Pietro Foschi (27 Feb 1880 – 12 Nov 1895 (died))

=== Archdiocese of Perugia ===
Elevated: 27 March 1882, with the Latin name Archidioecesis Perusina

- Dario Mattei-Gentili (29 November 1895 – 30 September 1910 (resigned))
- Beda Giovanni Cardinale, O.S.B. (8 November 1910 – 9 October 1922 (appointed Apostolic Nuncio to Argentina)
- Giovanni Battista Rosa (11 December 1922 – 29 October 1942 (died))
- Mario Vianello (11 March 1943 – 13 August 1955 (died))
- Pietro Parente (15 September 1955 – 23 October 1959 (appointed Titular Archbishop of Ptolemais in Thebaide; future cardinal)
- Raffaele Baratta (17 December 1959 – 15 October 1968 (retired))
- Ferdinando Lambruschini (15 October 1968 – 25 July 1981 (died))
- Cesare Pagani (21 November 1981 – 12 March 1988 (died))

=== Archdiocese of Perugia-Città della Pieve ===
United: 30 September 1986 with the Diocese of Città della Pieve; Latin name: Archidioecesis Perusina-Civitatis Plebis

- Ennio Antonelli (6 October 1988 – 26 May 1995 (resigned); future cardinal
- Giuseppe Chiaretti (9 December 1995 – 16 July 2009 (retired)
- Gualtiero Bassetti (16 July 2009 – 27 May 2022 (retired), cardinal in 2014
- Ivan Maffeis, (11 September 2022 - Incumbat)

== General references ==
- Ughelli, Ferdinando; Coleti, Niccolò (1717). Italia sacra sive De Episcopis Italiae (in Latin) (Second ed.). Venice: apud Sebastianum Coleti. pp. 1153–1174.
