= Fabrizio Paolucci (bishop) =

Italian Roman Catholic prelate

Most Reverend Fabrizio Paolucci
- Bishop of Città della Pieve
- Church: Catholic Church
- Diocese: Diocese of Città della Pieve
- In office: 1605–1625
- Successor: Celso Zani

Orders
- Consecration: 7 August 1605 by Alfonso Visconti

Personal details
- Born: 1565 Forlì, Italy
- Died: 30 January 1625 (aged 59–60) Città della Pieve

Fabrizio Paolucci (1565 – 30 January 1625) was a Roman Catholic prelate who served as Bishop of Città della Pieve (1605–1625).

== Biography ==
Fabrizio Paolucci was born in Forlì, Italy in 1565.

On 3 August 1605, he was appointed during the papacy of Pope Paul V as Bishop of Città della Pieve. On 7 August 1605, he was consecrated bishop by Alfonso Visconti, Bishop of Spoleto.

He served as Bishop of Città della Pieve until his death on 30 January 1625.

== See also ==
- Catholic Church in Italy

== External links and additional sources ==
- Cheney, David M. "Diocese of Città della Pieve". Catholic-Hierarchy.org. (for Chronology of Bishops) ^{[self-published]}
- Chow, Gabriel. "Diocese of Città della Pieve". GCatholic.org. (for Chronology of Bishops) ^{[self-published]}

Catholic Church titles
Preceded by	Bishop of Città della Pieve; 1605–1625	Succeeded by Celso Zani
