= Roman Catholic Diocese of Montemarano =

The Diocese of Montemarano (Latin: Dioecesis Montis Marani) was a Roman Catholic diocese located in the town of Montemarano in the province of Avellino in the Campania region of southern Italy. It was erected in 1059, and was a member of the ecclesiastical province of Benevento. In 1818, the diocese was suppressed, and its territory and Catholic population was assigned to the Diocese of Nusco. The diocese of Nusco has been absorbed, since 30 September 1986, into the agglomerate Archdiocese of Sant'Angelo dei Lombardi-Conza-Nusco-Bisaccia.

The diocese of Montemarano was nominally restored as a titular bishopric in 1968, which were needed with the increase in the number of auxiliary bishops, vicars apostolic, papal nuncios, and Vatican bureaucrats who needed nominal episcopal status.

== Bishops ==
=== 1079 to 1500 ===
- Giovanni (John of Montemarano), O.S.B. (1079 – ?)
- Giovanni II (1119? – ?)
- Matteo da Monteforte (1179? – ?)
- Rufinus (1290? – 1296.08.09)
- Corrado (1296.11 – ?)
- Pietro (1329? – ?)
- Barbato (1331? – ?)
- Pietro (1334 – 1343.06.09)
- Ponzio Excondevilla, O.P. (1343.06.09 – 1346.11.17)
- Marco Manente Franceschi, O.Min. (1346.11.17 – ?)
- Andrea (? – death 1349)
- Nicola da Bisaccia (1350.12.03 – death 1364)
- Giacomo Cotelle, O.F.M. (1364.11.27 – ?)
- Antonio da Fontanarossa, O.Min. (1372.06.21 – ?)
- Agostino I (1396.02.04 – ?)
- Agostino II (1413 – ?)
- Martino (1423? – ?)
- Marino da Monopoli, O.F.M. (1452.07.14 – ?)
- Ladislao Dentice (1462.03.26 – death 1477)
- Agostino da Siena (bishop), O.F.M. (1477.01.24 – death 1484)
- Simeone Dantici, O.F.M. (1484.02.11 – death 1487)
- Antonio Bonito da Cueccaro, O.F.M. (1487.01.26 – 1494.03.19)
- Giuliano Isopo, O.Carm. (1494.03.19 – 1516 first term - see below)

=== 1500 to 1805 ===
- Pietro Giovanni de Melis (1516.11.08 – 1517.04.20), bishop-elect.
- Severo Petrucci (1517.04.20 – 1520)
- Andrea Aloisi (1520.10.19 – death 1528?)
- Giuliano Isopo, O. Carm. (see above - second term 1528 – 1528.03.28)
- Gerolamo Isopo, Canons Regular of Lateran (C.R.L.) (1528.03.28 – death 1551.12.01)
- Antonio Gaspar Rodríguez, O.F.M. (1552.12.14 – 1570.10.20), later Metropolitan Archbishop of Lanciano (Italy) (1570.10.20 – death 1578.11.01)
- Marcantonio Alferio (1571.01.20 – death 1595)
- Silvestro Branconi (1596.01.08 – death 1603)
- Marcantonio Genovesi (1603.05.09 – 1611.09.26)
- Eleuterio Albergone, O.F.M.Conv. (1611.11.14 – death 1635)
- Francesco Antonio Porpora (1635.05.07 – death 1640)
- Urbano Zambotti, C.R.Theat. (1640.05.21 – death 1657)
- Giuseppe Battaglia (1657.07.09 – death 1669.12)
- Giuseppe Labonia (1670.11.17 – death 1720.03)
- Giovanni Crisostomo Verchio, O.S.B.I. (1720.05.06 – 1726)
- Giovanni Ghirardi (1726.03.20 – 1745.10.08)
- Innocenzo Sanseverino (1746 – 1753)
- Giuseppe Antonio Passanti (1753 – death 1774.03.31)
- Onofrio Maria Gennari (1774 – death 1805)

=== Titular see ===
The following bishops have held or hold the title; 'Archbishop' is a personal title, granted to a nuncio to give him status, but he is still 'titular bishop':

- Bishop Alejo del Carmen Obelar Colman, Benedictine Order (S.D.B.) (1969.03.06 – 1989.12.30)
- Archbishop Salvatore Pennacchio (1998.11.28 – ...), Apostolic Nuncio (papal ambassador) to India and Nepal.

== Books ==
- Cappelletti, Giuseppe (1866). Le chiese d'Italia della loro origine sino ai nostri giorni (in Italian). Vol. vigesimo (20). Venezia: Antonelli. pp. 407–414.
- Eubel, Conradus, ed. (1913). Hierarchia catholica, Tomus 1 (second ed.). Münster: Libreria Regensbergiana. (in Latin)
- Eubel, Conradus, ed. (1914). Hierarchia catholica, Tomus 2 (second ed.). Münster: Libreria Regensbergiana.
- Gulik, Guilelmus (1923). Eubel, Conradus (ed.). Hierarchia catholica, Tomus 3 (second ed.). Münster: Libreria Regensbergiana.
- Gams, Pius Bonifatius (1873). Series episcoporum Ecclesiae catholicae: quotquot innotuerunt a beato Petro apostolo (in Latin). Ratisbon: Typis et Sumptibus Georgii Josephi Manz.
- Gauchat, Patritius (Patrice) (1935). Hierarchia catholica IV (1592-1667). Münster: Libraria Regensbergiana.
- Ritzler, Remigius; Sefrin, Pirminus (1952). Hierarchia catholica medii et recentis aevi V (1667-1730). Patavii: Messagero di S. Antonio.
- Ritzler, Remigius; Sefrin, Pirminus (1958). Hierarchia catholica medii et recentis aevi VI (1730-1799). Patavii: Messagero di S. Antonio.
- Ughelli, Ferdinando; Coleti, Niccolò (1721). Italia sacra sive De episcopis Italiæ, et insularum adjacentium, r (in Latin). Vol. Tomus octavus (8). Venezia: apud Sebastianum Coleti. pp. 332–344.
