= Roman Catholic Diocese of Ravello and Scala =

The former cathedral of Ravello

The Diocese of Ravello e Scala (Latin: Dioecesis Ravellensis et Scalensis) was a Roman Catholic diocese located in the town of Ravello on the Amalfi Coast in the province of Salerno, Campania, southern Italy. The town is about 7 km (4 mi) from Amalfi. The diocese was established in 1087, by Pope Victor III. In 1818, it was suppressed by Pope Pius VII.

== History ==
Abbot Desiderius of Montecasssino was elected Pope Victor III in Rome on 24 May 1286, but was forced to flee four days later, in the face of Antipope Clement III, who was supported by the Emperor Henry IV. For nearly ten months, the pope-elect gave no definitive acceptance or refusal of the office. In March 1287, he was at Capua, where he held a council of his supporters, lay and clerical, and was finally persuaded to take on the office and allow himself to be invested with the papal insignia. With the aid of Duke Roger Borsa and many others, he was able to regain the Trastevere in Rome, and was consecrated a bishop at St. Peter's Basilica on 9 May 1087. His consecration of Ursus as bishop of Ravello, at the demand of Duke Roger, must have taken place between 9 May and the pope's death on 16 September 1087.

At Capua, probably in August 1087, Pope Victor confirmed for Bishop Urso, at his request, possession of the city and diocese of Ravello. On 7 October 1090, Pope Urban II issued a bull, liberating the diocese of Ravello from all local jurisdictions, making it directly subordinate to the Holy See. Consequently, in 1094, Urban II consecrated Bishop Constantinus Rogadeus, who, on 29 September 1101, obtained from Pope Paschal II a privilegium, stating that the diocese would always be directly subject to the Papacy, and each bishop of Ravello would be consecrated by the pope. The Liber Censuum (1194) confirms the grant: "In episcopatu Ravellensi: Qui est domini papae...."

=== Ravello e Scala ===
On 31 July 1603, Pope Clement VIII united the diocese of Scala with the diocese of Ravello, aeque personaliter. The privilege of Ravello's exemption from all other jurisdictions except the papacy continued even after the union of the two dioceses. Scala, however, was a suffragan of the archdiocese of Amalfi.

==== Seminary ====
Until the 17th century, Ravello had no seminary at all, but relied on the houses of the Benedictines, Augustinians, and Franciscans to train candidates for the priesthood. These houses, however, were suppressed in 1652, and the episcopal palace had to house the seminary. In 1660, the cathedral Chapter undertook to find a suitable building near the cathedral to house a seminary. By 1665, a seminary was established, with funds appropriated from two of the suppressed religious houses, but by 1695 it had virtually ceased to exist.

=== Reorganization of 1818 ===
Following the extinction of the Napoleonic Kingdom of Italy, the Congress of Vienna authorized the restoration of the Papal States and the Kingdom of Naples. Since the French occupation had seen the abolition of many Church institutions in the kingdom, as well as the confiscation of most Church property and resources, it was imperative that Pope Pius VII and King Ferdinand IV reach agreement on restoration and restitution. Ferdinand, however, was not prepared to accept the pre-Napoleonic situation, in which Naples was a feudal subject of the papacy. Lengthy, detailed, and acrimonious negotiations ensued.

In 1818, a new concordat with the Kingdom of the Two Sicilies committed the pope to the suppression of more than fifty small dioceses in the kingdom. These were carried out in the papal bull "De Utiliore" of 27 June 1818. Amalfi lost its status as a metropolitan archdiocese and became merely the Archdiocese of Amalfi, when its suffragan dioceses, Minori and Ravello, and Scala were suppressed.

== Bishops of Ravello ==
Erected: 1087
Latin Name: Ravellensis

=== From 1087 to 1418 ===
- Ursus Papitius, O.S.B. (1087–1094)
- Constantinus Rogadeus (1094–1150)
- Joannes Ruffulus (1150–1209)
- Pantaleo (1210–1220)
- Leo Rogadei (1220–1229)
- Pietro de Plano (c. 1230– ? )
- Petrus da Durazzo, O.S.B. (c. 1275–1284)
- Ptolomaeus, O.E.S.A. (1286–1290)
- Joannes Allegri (1291–1321)
- Francesco Castaldo (1321–1362)
- Sergius Grisoni (1363–1379) Roman Obedience
- Roberto Ruffo, O.S.B. (c. 1379–1397), Roman Obedience
- Borchardus de Hoxaria (1385– ? ), Avignon Obedience
- Andreas Fusco (1397–1400), Roman Obedience
- Pellegrinus Rufulus (1400–1401), Roman Obedience
- Ludovicus Apenditanus (1401–1407), Roman Obedience

Sede vacante (1407–1409)

- Nicolas de Doncellis (1409–1413 Removed), Roman Obedience
- Astorgius Agnese (1413–1418)

=== From 1418 to 1603 ===
- Martinus de Groniano (1418)
- Benedetto de Pradosso (1418–1432)
- Goffredo de Porcariis (1432– ? )
- Lorenzo de Riccii (1435–1455)
- Nicolaus Campanile (1455–1456)
- Domenico Mercari (1456–1489)
- Cosmas Setarius (1489–1506)
- Francesco Lavello, O.Carth. (1506–1508 ?)
- Nicolaus (1509)
- Godescalc de la Patara (1509–1528)
- Serenus de Astoriis, O.S.A. (1528)
- Bernardino de Soria, O.F.M. (23 Feb 1529 –1536)
- Cardinal Francesco Quinones (1536–1537), Administrator
- Antonio Lunello (1537–1541)
- Giovanni Modanus (Mohedanus) (1541–1549)
- Lodovico Beccatelli (27 May 1549 –1555)
- Ercole Tambosi (19 Sep 1555 – 1570 Died)
- Paolo Fusco (25 Sep 1570 –1578)
- Emilio Scataratica (17 Mar 1578 – 11 Nov 1590 Died)
- Paolo De Curtis, C.R. (1591–1600)
- Antonio de Franchis, C.R. (31 Jul 1600 – 1603 Resigned)

== Bishops of Ravello e Scala ==
United: 31 July 1603 with the Diocese of Scala

- Francesco Bennio de Butrio, O.S.M. (30 Jul 1603 – 19 Jan 1617)
- Michele Bonzi, O.F.M. (13 Mar 1617 – 1623)
- Honuphrius a Verme (1624–1637)
- Celestino Puccitelli, B. (17 Aug 1637 – 14 Sep 1641)
- Bernardino Panicola (15 Dec 1642 – 10 Nov 1666 Died)
- Giuseppe Saggese (16 Mar 1667 – 18 Feb 1694)
- Luigi Capuani (Ludovico Capulani) (15 Mar 1694 – 14 Dec 1705 Appointed, Bishop of Gravina di Puglia)
- Nicolò Rocco (22 Feb 1706 – 21 Feb 1707 Appointed, Bishop of Cassano all'Jonio)
- Giuseppe Maria Perrimezzi, O.M. (11 Apr 1707 – 26 Feb 1714 Appointed, Bishop of Oppido Mamertina)
- Nicola Guerriero (6 Apr 1718 – 30 Apr 1732)
- Antonio Maria Santoro, O.M. (9 Jun 1732 – 10 May 1741)
- Biagio Chiarelli (26 Nov 1742 – 31 May 1765)
- Michele Tafuri (5 Aug 1765 –1778)
- Nicola Molinari, O.F.M. Cap. (1 Jun 1778 –1783)
- Silvestro (Jean Baptiste) Miccù, O.F.M. Obs. (27 Feb 1792 Confirmed –1804)

Sede vacante (1804–1818)

Both dioceses were suppressed in 1818.

== Books ==
=== Lists of bishops ===
- Eubel, Conradus, ed. (1913). Hierarchia catholica (in Latin). Vol. 1 (Tomus 1) (second ed.). Münster: Libreria Regensbergiana. pp. 412, 437.. Archived.
- Eubel, Conradus, ed. (1914). Hierarchia catholica (in Latin). Vol. 2 (Tomus 2) (second ed.). Münster: Libreria Regensbergiana. pp. 221, 231.. Archived.
- Eubel, Conradus, ed. (1923). Hierarchia catholica (in Latin). Vol. 3 (Tomus 3) (second ed.). Münster: Libreria Regensbergiana. pp. 282, 294.. Archived.
- Gams, Pius Bonifatius (1873). Series episcoporum Ecclesiae catholicae: quotquot innotuerunt a beato Petro apostolo (in Latin). Ratisbon: Typis et Sumptibus Georgii Josephi Manz. pp. 915, 921.
- Gauchat, Patritius (Patrice) (1935). Hierarchia catholica IV (1592-1667) (in Latin). Münster: Libraria Regensbergiana.
- Ritzler, Remigius; Sefrin, Pirminus (1952). Hierarchia catholica medii et recentis aevi V (1667-1730) (in Latin). Patavii: Messagero di S. Antonio.
- Ritzler, Remigius; Sefrin, Pirminus (1958). Hierarchia catholica medii et recentis aevi VI (1730-1799) (in Latin). Patavii: Messagero di S. Antonio.

=== Studies ===
- Cappelletti, Giuseppe (1866). Le chiese d'Italia della loro origine sino ai nostri giorni (in Italian). Vol. 20 (vigesimo). Venezia: Giuseppe Antonelli. pp. 612–615.
- Kehr, Paulus Fridolinus (1935). Italia pontificia. Vol. VIII: Regnum Normannorum—Campania. (in Latin). Berlin: Weidmann. pp. 395-396 (Scala), 401-405 (Ravello).
- Mansi, Luigi (1887). Ravello sacra-monumentale. (in Italian). Ravello: Zimi di Milano, 1887.
- Ughelli, Ferdinando; Coleti, Niccolò (1717). Italia sacra, sive De Episcopis Italiae (in Latin). Vol. I (Tomus primus) (secunda ed.). Venice: apud Sebastianum Coleti. pp. 1181–1194.
- Reid, Francis Neville (1897). Ravello. (ed. E. Allen). Naples: Emil Prass 1897.
- Ughelli, Ferdinando; Coleti, NIccolo (1721). Italia sacra sive De episcopis Italiæ, et insularum adjacentium (in Latin). Vol. 7 (Tomus septimus). Venice: apud Sebastianum Coleti. pp. 321–342.
