= Fabrizio Paolucci (1726–1810) =

Fabrizio Paolucci (1726–1810) was a marquis (marchese) of the patrician Paolucci family. He is a relative of cardinal Fabrizio Paolucci, and an ancestor of Fabrizio Paolucci, who wrote biographies on the family.

== Further information ==
- Fabrizio Paolucci De' Calboli Ginnasi (1925). Cenni Biografici dei Cardinali della Famiglia Paolucci De' Calboli. Forli: Stab. Tipografico Valbonesi.
