= Diocese of San Benedetto del Tronto-Ripatransone-Montalto =

Roman Catholic diocese in Italy

Coordinates: 42.9438°N 13.8833°E

Diocese of San Benedetto del Tronto-Ripatransone-Montalto Dioecesis Sancti Benedicti ad Truentum-Ripana-Montis Alti

Catholic
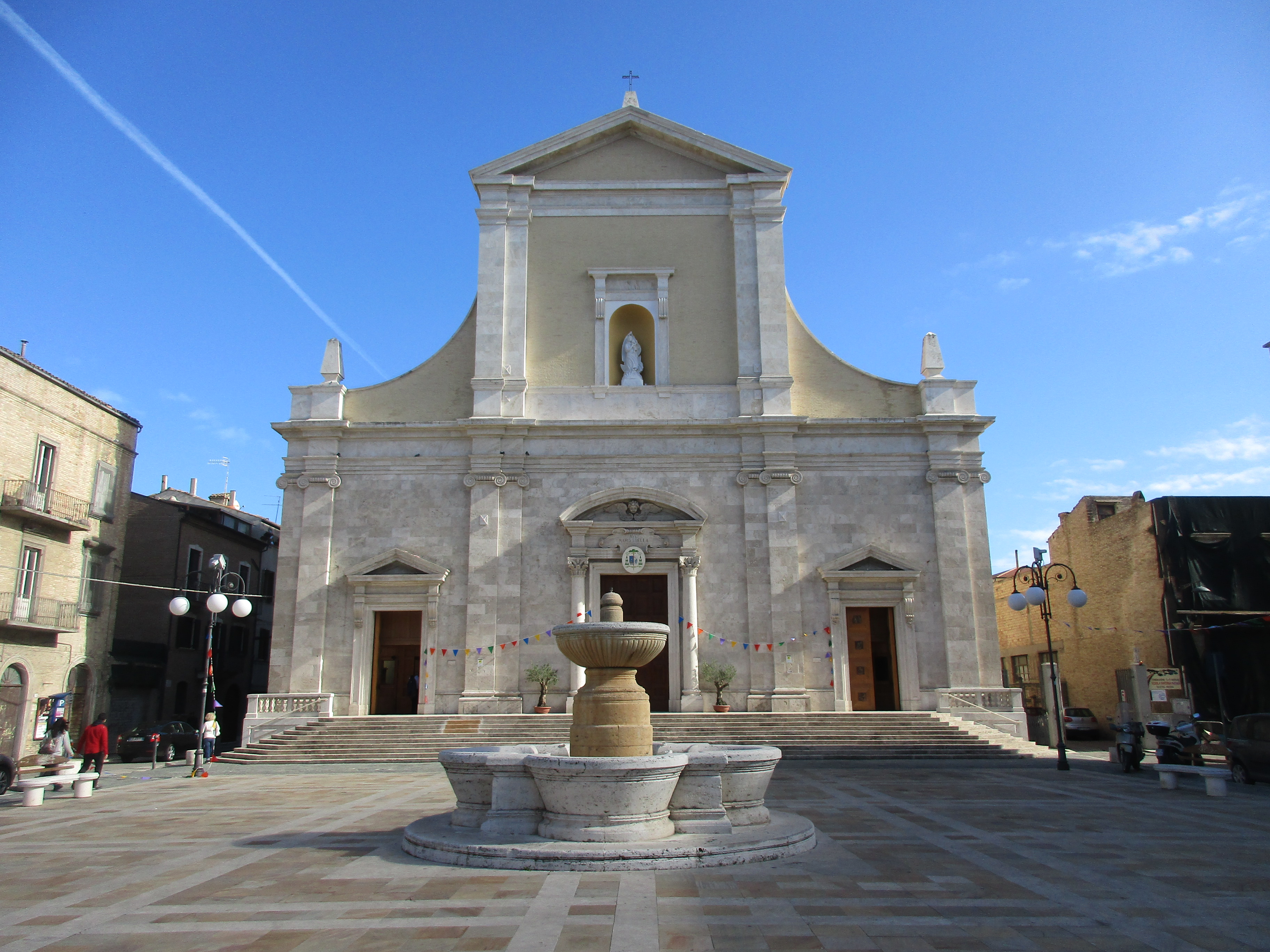
- Cathedral of San Benedetto del Tronto

Location
- Country: Italy
- Ecclesiastical province: Fermo

Statistics
- Area: 456 km^{2} (176 sq mi)
- Population: Total; Catholics: (as of 2017); 144,000 (guess); 137,400
- Parishes: 54

Information
- Denomination: Catholic Church
- Rite: Roman Rite
- Established: 1 August 1571 (455 years ago)
- Cathedral: Basilica Cattedrale di S. Maria della Marina (San Benedetto del Tronto)
- Co-cathedral: Basilica Concattedrale di S. Gregorio Magno (Ripatransone); Basilica Concattedrale di S. Maria Assunta (Montalto Marche)
- Secular priests: 54 (diocesan); 48 (Religious Orders); 14 Permanent Deacons

Current leadership
- Pope: Leo XIV
- Bishop: Gianpiero Palmieri
- Bishops emeritus: Carlo Bresciani

Map
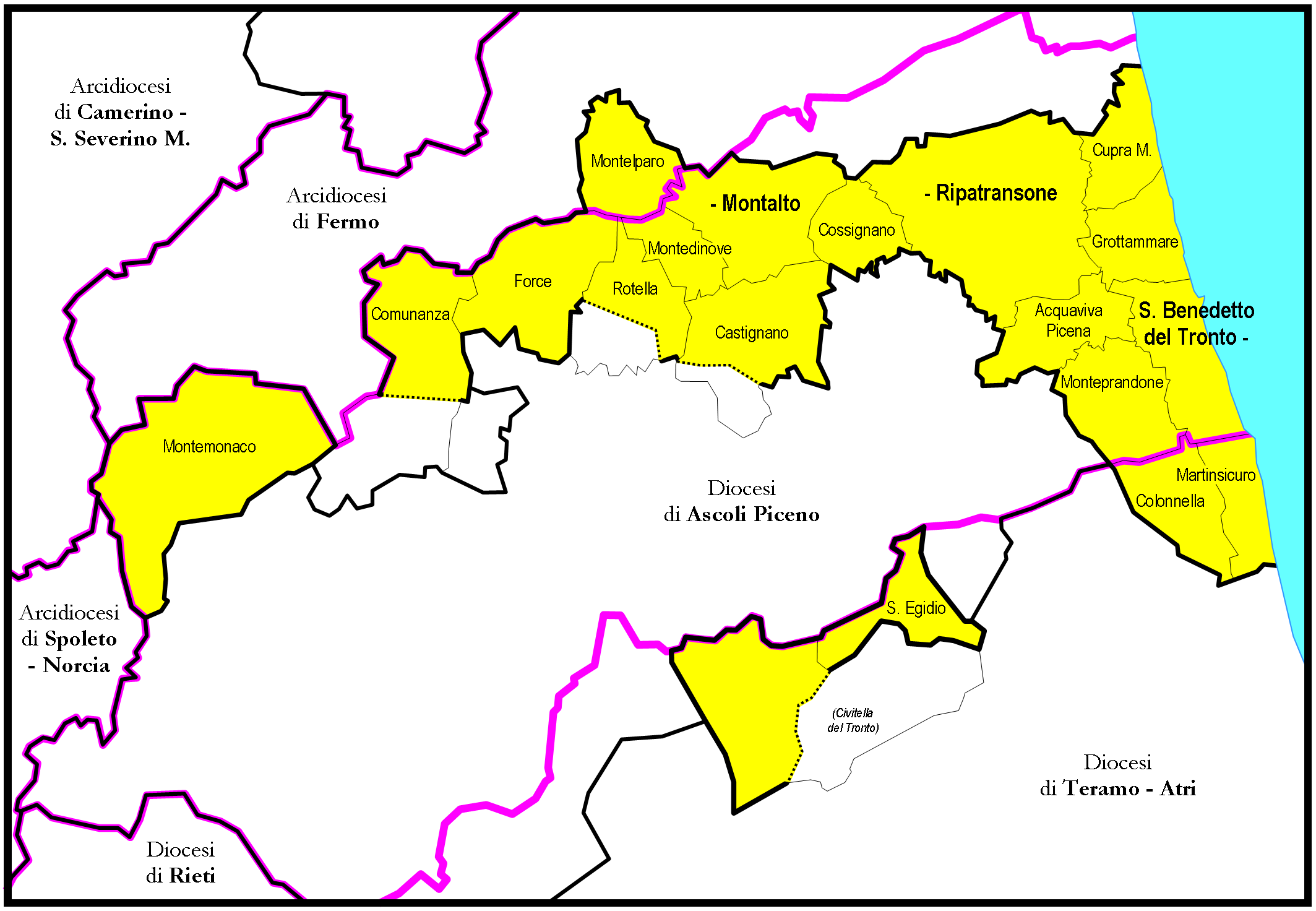

Website
- www.diocesisbt.it

The Diocese of San Benedetto del Tronto-Ripatransone-Montalto (Latin: Dioecesis Sancti Benedicti ad Truentum-Ripana-Montis Alti) is a Latin diocese of the Catholic Church in the Marche. It has existed in its current form since 1986. In that year the Diocese of Montalto was united into the Diocese of Ripatransone-San Benedetto del Tronto, which was the renamed historical Diocese of Ripatransone (as of 1983). The Roman Catholic Diocese of San Benedetto del Tronto-Ripatransone-Montalto has been a suffragan see of the Roman Catholic Archdiocese of Fermo since 1680.

== History ==
Ripatransone is on a hill called Cuprae Mons ("Mountain of Cupra", an ancient deity of the pre-Roman inhabitants), and was a Picene settlement. The origin of the modern name has been disputed; it comes probably from Ripa Trasonis, "Hill of Traso", from the name of the first feudal lord. The castle was erected there in the early Middle Ages, and enlarged later by the bishops of Fermo, who had several conflicts with the people.

=== Creation of the diocese ===
On 1 August 1571, in the bull "Illius Fulciti", Pope Pius V raised the castle town of Ripatransone to the status of a city (civitas) and made it an episcopal see, including in its jurisdiction small portions of the surrounding diocese of Fermo, diocese of Ascoli Piceno, diocese of Teramo, and the independent Benedictine monastery of Campo Fellonis. The parish church of S. Benigno was raised to the status of a cathedral. The Pope decreed that it should have a cathedral Chapter, composed of two dignities (the Archpriest and the Archdeacon) and twelve Canons. The archpriest was to act as pastor of the cathedral parish.

In the same document, the Pope ordered that the new city of Ripatransone should have four parishes: one at the cathedral for the district of Agello, the church of S. Angelo de Rofflano for the district of S. Domenico; Ss. Nicholas, Rusticus and Eleutherius for the monte antiquo; and Ss. Gregory and Margarita for the caput montis. The three parish churches were to be prebends of three Canons, who would administer them through vicars.

On 3 October 1571, Pope Pius named as its first bishop Lucio Sassi, who became a cardinal more than twenty years later.

=== Diocesan synods ===
A diocesan synod was an irregularly held, but important, meeting of the bishop of a diocese and his clergy. Its purpose was (1) to proclaim generally the various decrees already issued by the bishop; (2) to discuss and ratify measures on which the bishop chose to consult with his clergy; (3) to publish statutes and decrees of the diocesan synod, of the provincial synod, and of the Holy See.

A diocesan synod was held in Ripatransone by Bishop Filippo Sega (1575–1578) in 1576; the acts of the synod were published at Macerata in 1577. There is reference to a synod held in Ripatransone on 30 July 1616, which would have been summoned by Bishop Sebastiano Poggi (1607–1620). Bishop Niccolò Orsini presided over a diocesan synod on 26–27 October 1642, and held his second diocesan synod in 1648. On 1 May 1689, Bishop Giovan Giorgio Mainardi (1680–1693) held a diocesan synod. Bishop Pietro Alessandro Procaccini (1695–1704) held a diocesan synod in 1699.

Bishop Francesco Andrea Correa presided over a diocesan synod at Ripatransone on 18 September 1729. In c. 1741, Bishop Giacomo Costa, C.R. (1739–1747) held a diocesan synod.

On 19–21 October 1885, Giuseppe Ceppetelli (1882–1890) presided over a diocesan synod in Ripatransone.

Bishop Lorenzo Azzolini (1620–1632) established the diocesan seminary in 1623.

The diocese, at first directly subject to the Holy See, has been a suffragan see of the Roman Catholic Archdiocese of Fermo since 1680.

=== Restructuring ===
In a bull of 18 December 1924, Pope Pius XI united the Diocese of Ripatransone with the diocese of Montalto ad personam episcopi. He appointed Luigi Ferri as Bishop of Ripatransone with Montalto, and ordered a change in the title of the bishop to Episcopus Montis alti et Ripanus. In 1980, the diocese of Montalto had a population of only 31,500 persons.

The Second Vatican Council (1962–1965), in order to ensure that all Catholics received proper spiritual attention, decreed the reorganization of the diocesan structure of Italy and the consolidation of small and struggling dioceses. It also recommended the abolition of anomalous units such as exempt territorial prelatures. These considerations applied to Montalto and to Ripatransone as the population migrated in the post-war period to jobs on the coast at San Benedetto.

On 18 February 1984, the Vatican and the Italian State signed a new and revised concordat. Based on the revisions, a set of Normae was issued on 15 November 1984, which was accompanied in the next year, on 3 June 1985, by enabling legislation. According to the agreement, the practice of having one bishop govern two separate dioceses at the same time, aeque personaliter, was abolished. Instead, the Vatican continued consultations which had begun under Pope John XXIII for the merging of small dioceses, especially those with personnel and financial problems, into one combined diocese. On 30 September 1986, Pope John Paul II ordered that the dioceses of Ripatransone and Montalto be merged into one diocese with one bishop, with the Latin title Dioecesis Sancti Benedicti ad Truentum-Ripana-Montis Alti. The seat of the diocese was to be in San Benedetto del Tronto, and the church of S. Maria della Marina was to serve as the cathedral of the merged dioceses. The cathedrals in Ripatransone and Montalto were to become co-cathedrals, and the cathedral Chapters were each to be a Capitulum Concathedralis. There was to be only one diocesan Tribunal, in San Benedetto del Tronto, and likewise one seminary, one College of Consultors, and one Priests' Council. The territory of the new diocese was to include the territory of the former dioceses of Montalto and Ripatransone.

As of July 2015, the number of Canons of the cathedral chapter was fixed at eight, including the Vicar General of the diocese, the Canon Penitentiary, the Canon Theologus, and the Exorcist. Three of these are considered dignities: the Archpriest of the cathedral, the Penitentiary, and the Theologus.

== Bishops ==
=== Diocese of Ripatransone ===
- Lucio Sassi (1571–1575 Resigned)
- Filippo Sega (1575–1578)
- Niccolò Aragonio (Aragona) (1578–1579)
- Troilo Boncompagni (1579–1582)
- Gaspare Silingardi (1582–1591 Resigned)
- Pompeo de Nobili (1591–1607)
- Sebastiano Poggi (1607–1620 Resigned)
- Lorenzo Azzolini (1620–1632)

Sede vacante (1632–1634)

Francesco Vitelli, titular Archbishop of Thessalonica. Administrator

- Antonio Arrigoni, O.F.M. Obs. (1634–1636)
- Niccolò Orsini (1636–1653 Died)
- Ulisse Orsini (1654–1679 Died)
- Giovan Giorgio Mainardi (1680–1693)
- Francesco Azzolini (1694)
- Pietro Alessandro Procaccini (1695–1704)
- Giosafatte (Giosafat) Battistelli (1705–1717)
- Gregorio Lauri (1717–1726)
- Francesco Andrea Correa, Sch. P. (1726–1738)
- Giacomo Costa, C.R. (1739–1747)
- Luca Niccolò Recchi (1747–1765)
- Bartolomeo Bitozzi (1765–1779)
- Bartolomeo Bacher (1779–1813)
- Michelangelo Calmet (1816–1817)
- Ignazio Ranaldi, C.O. (1818–1819 Appointed, Archbishop of Urbino)

Sede vacante (1818–1824)

- Filippo Monacelli (1824–1828)

Sede vacante (1828–1830)

Luigi Canestrari, Bishop of Montalto, Administrator

- Filippo Appignanesi (1830–1837)

Sede vacante (1837–1842)

Luigi Canestrari, Bishop of Montalto, Administrator

- Martino Caliendi (1842–1845)
- Giovanni Carlo Gentili (1845–1847)
- Camillo de' Marchesi Bisleti (1847–1854)
- Fidelis Bufarini (1854–1860)
- Alessandro Paolo Spoglia (1860–1867)
- Francesco Alessandrini (1871–1881)
- Giuseppe Ceppetelli (Cepetelli) (1882–1890)
- Giacinto Nicolai (1890–1899 Resigned)
- Raniero Sarnari (1900–1902)
- Luigi Boschi (1902–1924)
- Luigi Ferri (1924–1946 Retired)
- Pietro Ossola (1946–1951 Resigned)
- Vincenzo Radicioni (1951–1983 Retired)

=== Diocese of Ripatransone-San Benedetto del Tronto ===
Name Changed: 7 April 1983
Latin Name: Ripana-Sancti Benedicti ad Truentum

- Giuseppe Chiaretti (1983–1995)

=== Diocese of San Benedetto del Tronto-Ripatransone-Montalto ===
United 30 September 1986 with the Diocese of Montalto delle Marche
Latin Name: Sancti Benedicti ad Truentum-Ripana-Montis Alti

- Gervasio Gestori (1996–2013 Retired)
- Carlo Bresciani (2013–2024 Retired)
- Gianpiero Palmieri (2024–)

== Co-cathedrals ==
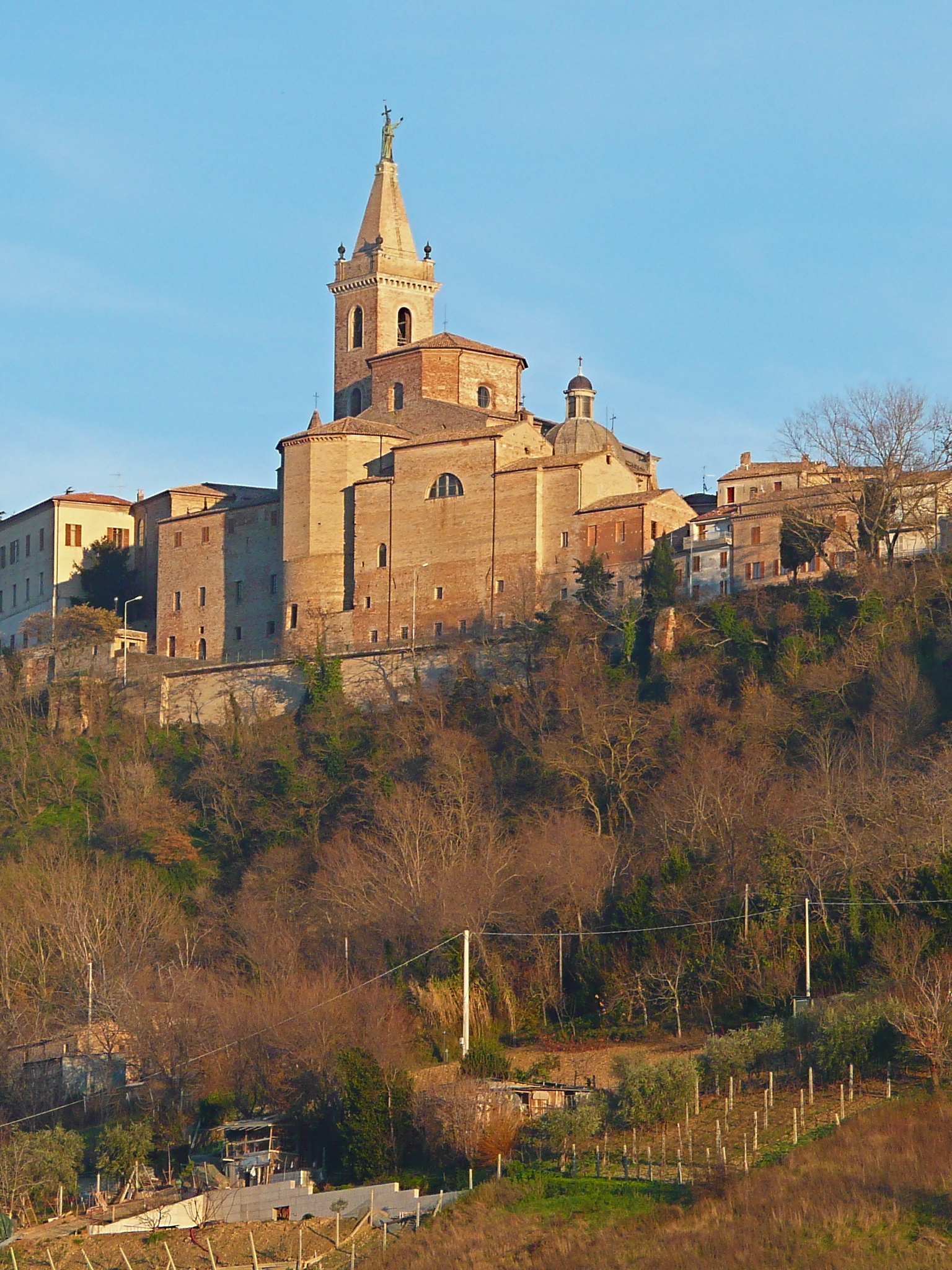
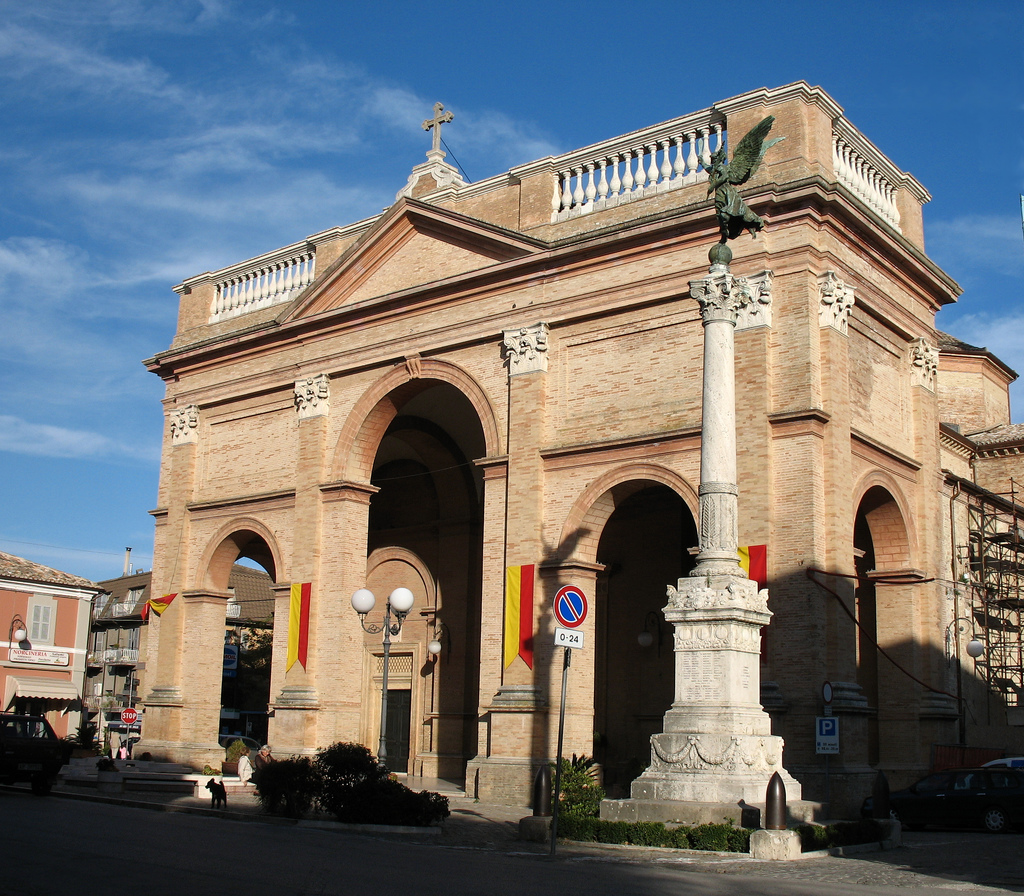
Cathedral of Ripatransone (left) Cathedral of Montalto delle Marche (right)

== Books ==
- Gams, Pius Bonifatius (1873). Series episcoporum Ecclesiae catholicae: quotquot innotuerunt a beato Petro apostolo. Ratisbon: Typis et Sumptibus Georgii Josephi Manz. p. 723.
- Gulik, Guilelmus (1923). Eubel, Conradus (ed.). Hierarchia catholica (in Latin). Vol. Tomus III (second ed.). Münster: Libreria Regensbergiana.
- Gauchat, Patritius (Patrice) (1935). Hierarchia catholica (in Latin). Vol. Tomus IV (1592–1667). Münster: Libraria Regensbergiana.
- Ritzler, Remigius; Sefrin, Pirminus (1952). Hierarchia catholica medii et recentis aevi (in Latin). Vol. Tomus V (1667–1730). Patavii: Messagero di S. Antonio.
- Ritzler, Remigius; Sefrin, Pirminus (1958). Hierarchia catholica medii et recentis aevi. Vol. Tomus VI (1730–1799). Patavii: Messagero di S. Antonio.
- Ritzler, Remigius; Sefrin, Pirminus (1968). Hierarchia Catholica medii et recentioris aevi (in Latin). Vol. VII (1800–1846). Monasterii: Libreria Regensburgiana.
- Remigius Ritzler; Pirminus Sefrin (1978). Hierarchia catholica Medii et recentioris aevi (in Latin). Vol. VIII (1846–1903). Il Messaggero di S. Antonio.
- Pięta, Zenon (2002). Hierarchia catholica medii et recentioris aevi (in Latin). Vol. IX (1903–1922). Padua: Messagero di San Antonio. ISBN 978-88-250-1000-8.

=== Studies ===
- Cappelletti, Giuseppe (1845). Le chiese d'Italia (in Italian). Vol. terzo (3). Venezia: Antonelli. pp. 707–719.
- Colucci, Giuseppe (1792). Delle Antichitá Picene. Delle antichitá del Medio, e Dell' infimo Evo, 3 (in Italian). Vol. Tomo XVIII. Fermo: Paccaroni.
- Ughelli, Ferdinando; Coleti, Niccolo (1717). Italia sacra; sive, De episcopis Italiæ (in Latin). Vol. Tomus secundus (secunda ed.). Venice: Apud Sebastianum Coleti. pp. 755–764.
