= Montemarano =

- Comune
- Comune di Montemarano
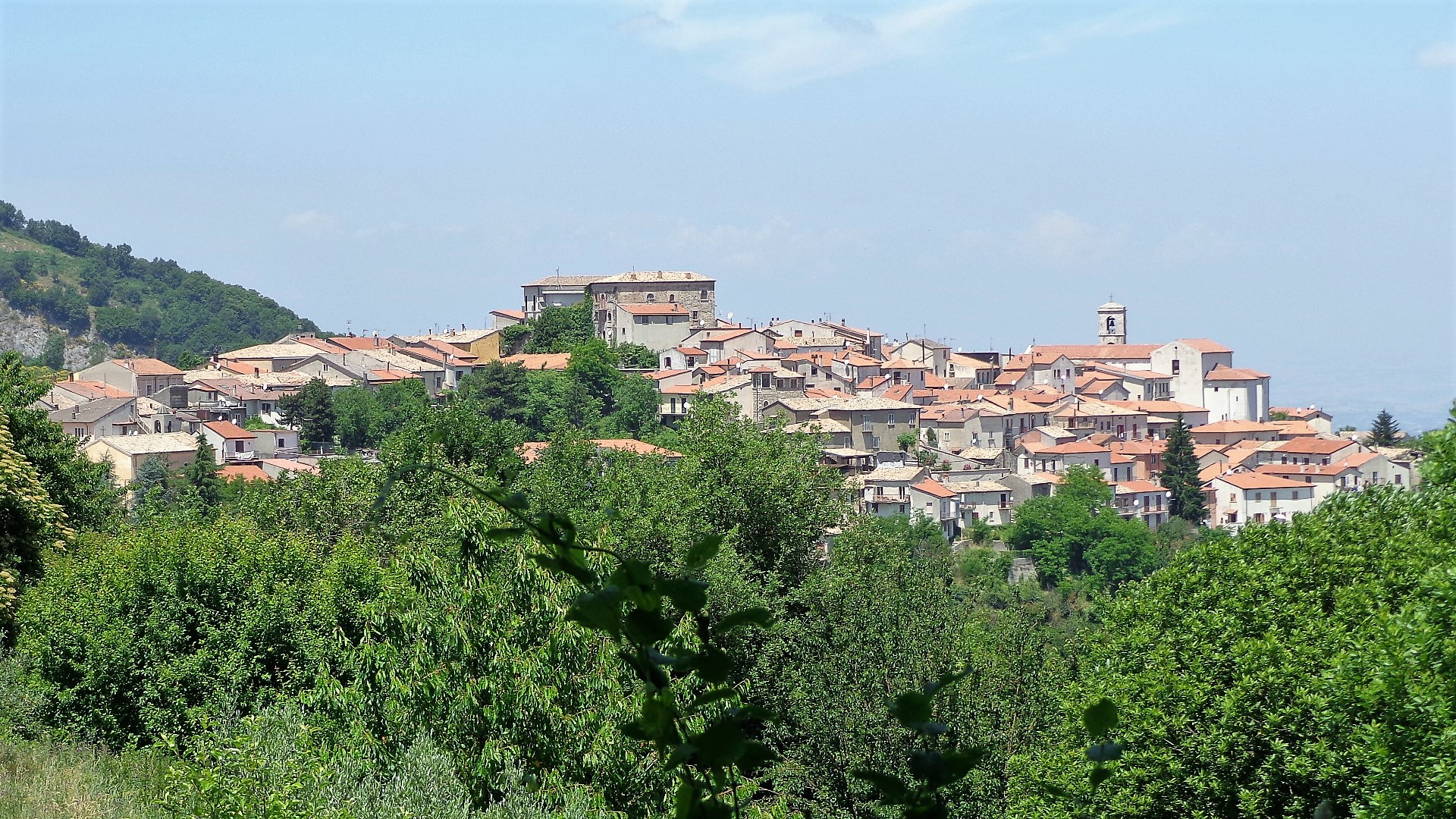

- Location within Italy Location within Campania
- Coordinates: 40°54′58″N 14°59′54″E
- Country: Italy
- Region: Campania
- Province: Avellino (AV)

Government
  - Mayor: Beniamino Palmieri

Area
  - Total: 34.01 km^{2} (13.13 sq mi)
- Elevation: 820 m (2,690 ft)

Population (30 November 2017)
  - Total: 2,821
  - Density: 82.95/km^{2} (214.8/sq mi)
- Demonym: Montemaranesi
- Time zone: UTC+1 (CET)
  - Summer (DST): UTC+2 (CEST)
- Postal code: 83040
- Dialing code: 0827
- Patron saint: St. John of Montemarano
- Saint day: 21 August
- Website: Official website

Montemarano is a town and comune, former Latin bishopric and present titular see in the province of Avellino in the Campania region of southern Italy.

== History ==
The existence of the town is documented since the 11th century. During the Norman rule of southern Italy, it was completely destroyed. Later it became a fiefdom of Raona of Fragneto. Other important feudal families were the Caracciolo, the Della Leonessa and the Della Marra. There is further evidence that it was a useful stopover by the Roman legions on their way to Brindisi, Terminus Appia A temple to the main Roman God, Jove was revealed decades ago dating to a style of building related to the Greeks. Hence, it is postulated that people inhabited Montemarano since BCE. A fire destroyed much of the documented evidence concerning the entire region.

During the years of World War II, between 1940 and 1943, Montemarano was one of the municipalities in Campania earmarked by the fascist authorities to receive Jewish refugees in civilian internment. The internees (at least 6, including a family with a teenage daughter) were all freed with the arrival of the Allied army in September 1943.

== Culture ==
The most important event is the Montemarano Carnival with its tarantella montemaranese, an ancient tradition of the place.

== Economy ==
The economy depends on agriculture, mostly on vineyards.

== See also ==
- Mezzogiorno
