= Roman Catholic Diocese of Città della Pieve =

Former diocese in Umbria

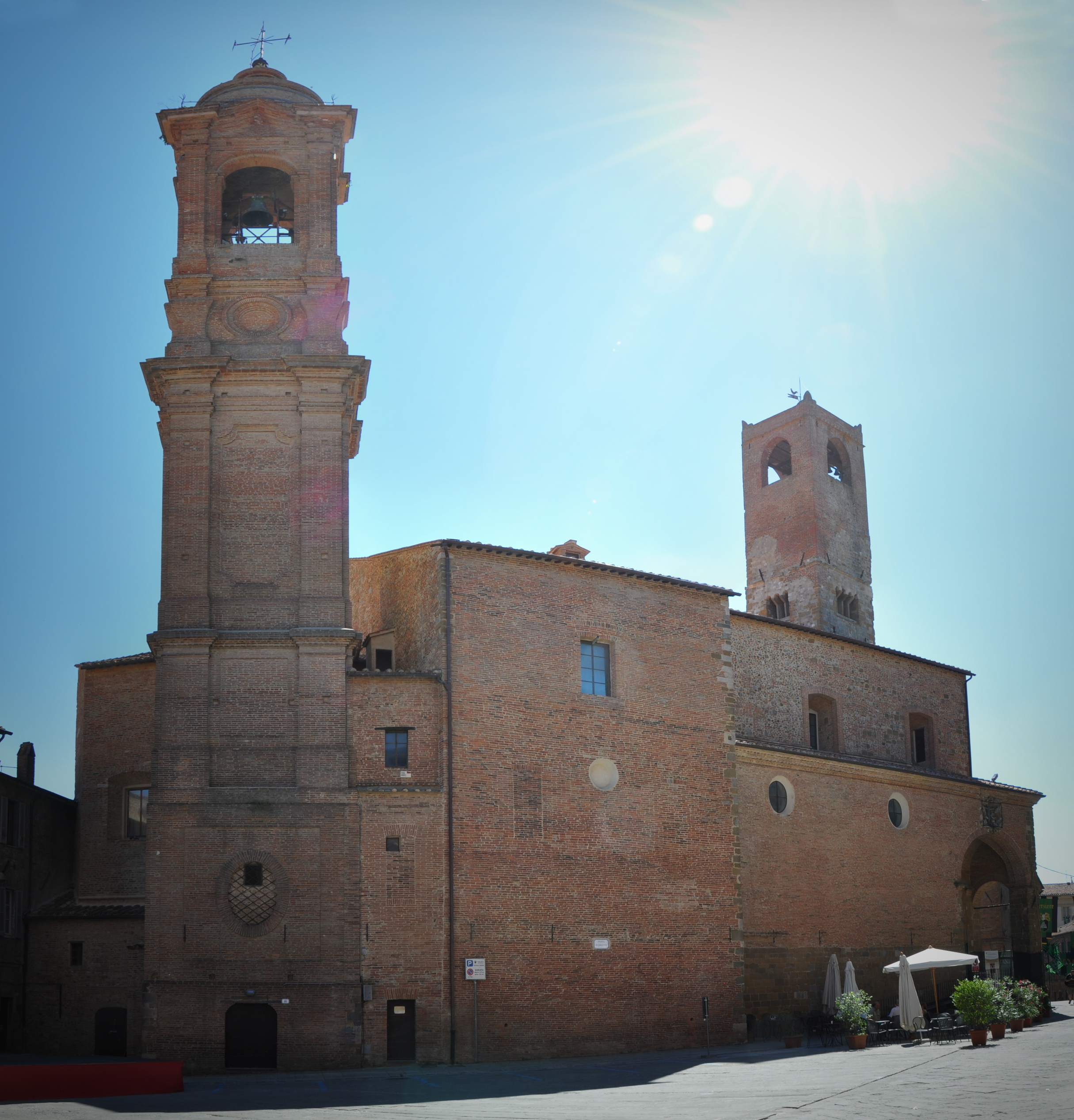
Cathedral of Saints Gervasius and Protasius - Città della Pieve (PG)

The former Italian Catholic Diocese of Città della Pieve, in Umbria, existed until 1986. In that year it was united into the Archdiocese of Perugia-Città della Pieve.

== History ==
Città della Pieve is a city of obscure origin in the province of Perugia. It certainly was an episcopal see in the eleventh century, since in 1099 the bishop was expelled by the Ghibellines. Later Pope Paschal II united it with the Diocese of Chiusi.

Pope Clement VIII re-established it as a separate see, immediately subject to the Holy See, in 1601, the first bishop being Fabrizio Paolucci of the Counts of Cabulo. In 1642, while Giovanni Battista Carcarasio was bishop, the city was sacked by the German soldiers of the Duke of Parma.

The cathedral, dedicated to Saints Gervasius and Protasius, is said to have been erected at the exhortation of St. Ambrose.

== Ordinaries ==
- Fabrizio Paolucci (3 Aug 1605 - 30 Jan 1625 Died)
- Celso Zani (3 Mar 1625 - 1629 Resigned)
- Sebastiano Ricci (bishop) (7 Jan 1630 - 7 Jan 1638 Died)
- Giovanni Battista Carcarasio (19 Apr 1638 - 24 Jan 1643 Died)
- Riginaldo Lucarini (9 Feb 1643 - 8 Oct 1671 Died)
- Carlo Francesco Muti (22 Feb 1672 - 4 Oct 1710 Died)
- Fausto Guidotti (26 Jan 1711 - 6 Dec 1731 Died)
- Francesco Maria Alberici (31 Mar 1732 - 27 Jun 1735 Appointed, Bishop of Foligno)
- Ascanio Argelati (27 Jun 1735 - 23 Jun 1738 Died)
- Gaetano Fraccagnani (3 Sep 1738 - 2 Apr 1748 Died)
- Virgilio Giannotti (15 May 1747 - 16 Apr 1751 Died)
- Ippolito Graziadei (5 Jul 1751 - 25 Jul 1754 Died)
- Angelo Maria Venizza (16 Dec 1754 - 7 Dec 1770 Died)
- Giovanni Evangelista Stefanini (4 Mar 1771 - 26 Apr 1775 Died)
- Tommaso Mancini (29 May 1775 - 17 Sep 1795 Retired)
- Francesco Maria Gazzoli (22 Sep 1795 - 11 Aug 1800 Appointed, Bishop of Amelia)
- Filippo Angelico (Antonius Maria Alexander) Becchetti, O.P. (11 Aug 1800 - 8 Jul 1814 Resigned)
- Bonaventura Carenzi (26 Sep 1814 - 13 Nov 1817 Died)
- Pier Camillo de Carolis (16 Mar 1818 - 26 Aug 1818 Died)
- Giulio Mami (2 Oct 1818 - 18 Jun 1837 Died)
- Giuseppe Maria Severa (2 Oct 1837 - 12 Sep 1853 Appointed, Bishop of Terni)
- Emidio Foschini (12 Sep 1853 - 1 Oct 1888 Died)
- Paolo Gregori (11 Feb 1889 - 19 Feb 1895 Died)
- Giovanni Tacci Porcelli (18 Mar 1895 - 17 Dec 1904 Appointed, Titular Archbishop of Nicaea)
- Domenico Fanucchi (24 Aug 1907 - 23 Jul 1910 Died)
- Giuseppe Angelucci (29 Aug 1910 - 2 May 1949 Died)
- Ezio Barbieri (2 Aug 1949 - 3 Jun 1977 Retired)
- Ferdinando Lambruschini (3 Jun 1977 - 25 Jul 1981 Died)
- Cesare Pagani (21 Nov 1981 - 30 Sep 1986 Appointed, Archbishop of Perugia-Città della Pieve)

United: 30 September 1986 with the Archdiocese of Perugia to form the Archdiocese of Perugia-Città della Pieve
