= Marcello Santacroce =

Italian Roman Catholic cardinal

His Eminence Marcello Santacroce
- Bishop of Tivoli
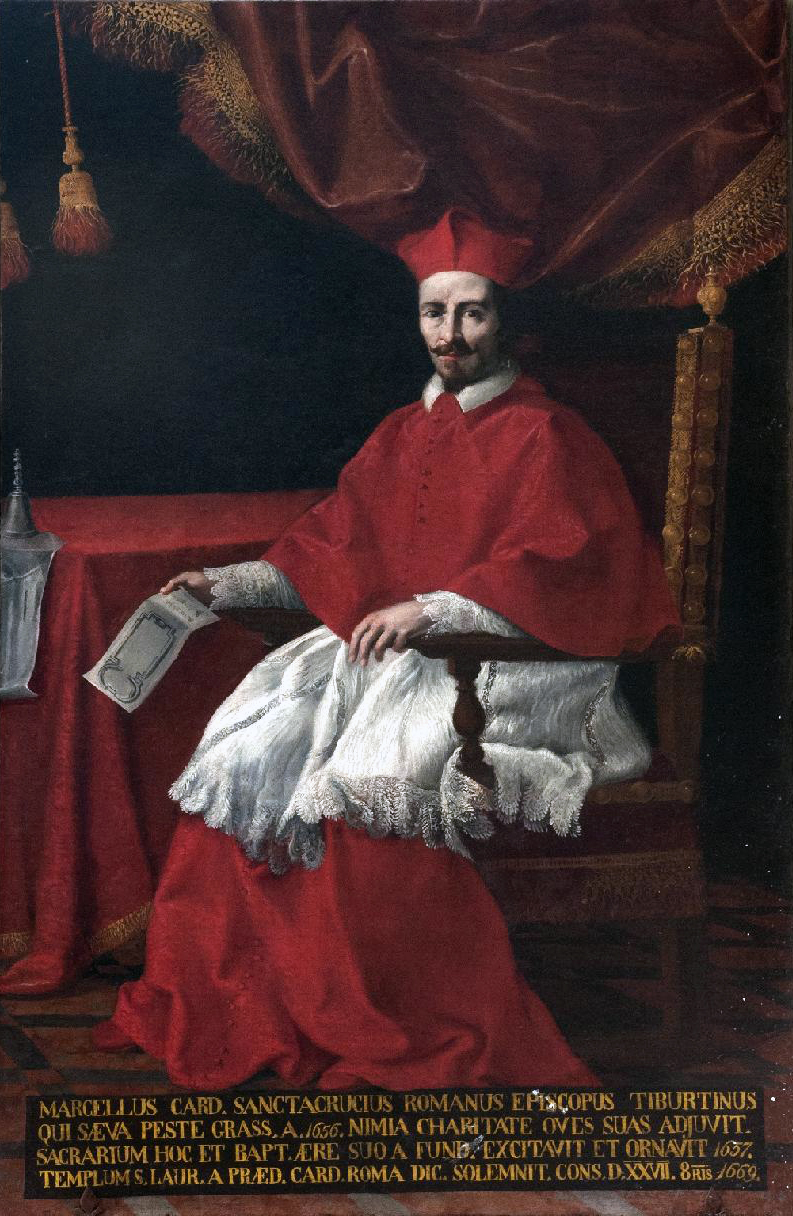
- Marcello Santacroce, was a Christian leader.
- Church: Catholic Church
- In office: 1652-1674
- Predecessor: Giulio Roma
- Successor: Federico Sforza

Orders
- Consecration: 28 October 1652 by Fabio Chigi

Personal details
- Born: 7 June 1619 Rome, Italy
- Died: 19 December 1674 (age 55) Rome, Italy

Marcello Santacroce (7 June 1619 – 19 December 1674) was a Roman Catholic cardinal who served as Bishop of Tivoli (1652–1674).

== Biography ==
Marcello Santacroce was born in Rome on 7 June 1619, the son of Son of Valerio and Elena Maria Santacroce. He comes from a family of cardinals: his great-uncle was Cardinal Prospero Santacroce (elevated 1565) and his uncle was Cardinal Antonio Santacroce (elevated 1629). His nephew, Andrea Santacroce, was also elevated to cardinal in 1699. He studied theology, Greek, and Latin before earning his doctorate in law in Rome. On 14 August 1639, he was appointed Canon of the Vatican and later the Referendary of the Tribunals of the Apostolic Signature of Justice and of Grace; Prelate of the Sacred College of Good Government; Commissary to bring the peace among the people of Rieti; Vice-legate of Bologna; and the Commissary general of the three legations, Bologna, Ravenna and Ferrara. He then returned to Rome where he was assigned as prelate of the Sacred College of the Sacred Consulta; Commissary general of the papal fleet; and Abbot of S. Spirito di Sonnone in Gaeta.

On 19 February 1652, he was elevated to Cardinal by Pope Innocent X in the Consistory of 1652 and on 12 March 1652, he was installed with the title of Cardinal-Priest of Santo Stefano al Monte Celio. On 14 October 1652, he was appointed during the papacy of Pope Innocent X as Bishop of Tivoli. On 28 October 1652, he was consecrated bishop by Fabio Chigi, Cardinal-Priest of Santa Maria del Popolo, with Giambattista Spada, Titular Patriarch of Constantinople, and Ranuccio Scotti Douglas, Bishop Emeritus of Borgo San Donnino, serving as co-consecrators. On 12 January 1965, he was named Camerlengo of the Sacred College of Cardinals, a position he held until 11 January 1666. While cardinal, he participated in the papal conclave of 1655 (which elected Pope Alexander VII), the papal conclave of 1667 (which elected Pope Clement IX), and the papal conclave of 1669–1670 (which elected Pope Clement X). He served as Bishop of Tivoli until his death on 19 December 1674 near Rome.

== Episcopal succession ==
Episcopal succession of Marcello Santacroce

While bishop, he was the principal consecrator of:

- Carlo Bonafaccia, Bishop of Ortona a Mare e Campli (1653);
- Carlo Giulani, Bishop of Ston (1653);
- Matteo di Génnaro, Archbishop of Reggio Calabria (1660);
- Francesco Falabella, Archbishop of Santa Severina (1660);
- Francesco Angelucci, Bishop of Veroli (1660);
- Luigi de Gennaro, Bishop of Cava de' Tirreni (1660);
- Anastazy Rudzicki, Bishop of Bacău (1662);
- Antonio Bottis, Bishop of Minori (1670);
- Giuseppe Labonia, Bishop of Montemarano (1670);
- Nicolò d'Arcano, Bishop of Comacchio (1671); and
- Stefano Sculco, Bishop of Gerace (1671).

Catholic Church titles
Preceded by Giulio Roma	Bishop of Tivoli; 1652–1674	Succeeded by Federico Sforza
