= Zaton, Dubrovnik-Neretva County =

Zaton
- Village
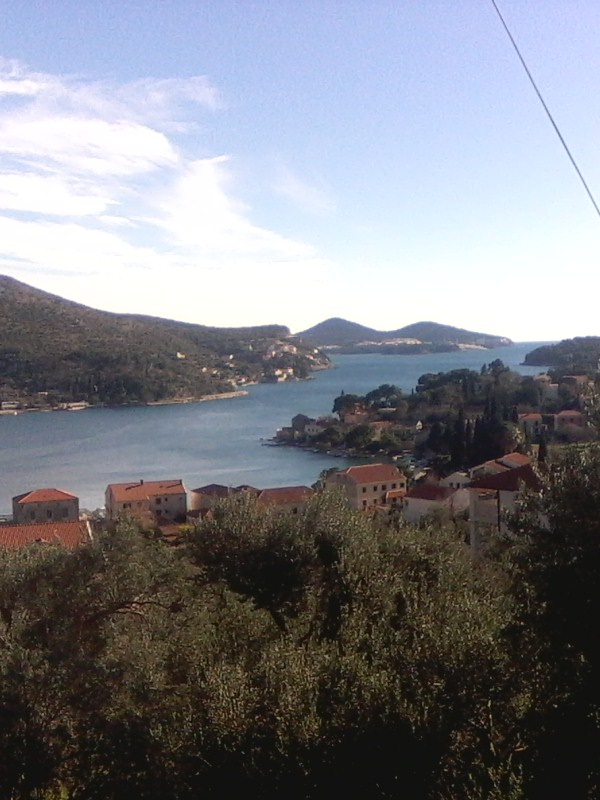
- Zaton Bay

- Location within Croatia
- Coordinates: 42°41′27″N 18°02′23″E
- Country: Croatia
- County: Dubrovnik-Neretva County
- Municipality: Dubrovnik

Area
  - Total: 2.0 sq mi (5.2 km^{2})

Population (2021)
  - Total: 1,024
  - Density: 510/sq mi (200/km^{2})
- Time zone: UTC+1 (CET)
  - Summer (DST): UTC+2 (CEST)
- Postal code: 20235 Zaton Veliki

Zaton is a village in southern Croatia, administratively located in the City of Dubrovnik. It is located on the coast of the eponymous bay, 8 km northwest of Dubrovnik, next to the village of Orašac. Chief occupations are tourism, fishing farming, viticulture, and olive growing.

Zaton is a tourist resort on the Dubrovnik Riviera, with 12 restaurants raising the dining quality in this small area, watersport venues, and an uphill hiking path to the village of Pobrežje (4.5 km), on the way to the Mociljska stalactite and stalagmite cave.

== Demographics ==
According to the 2021 census, its population was 1,024. It was 985 in 2011.

== Zaton bay ==
The Zaton bay is a picturesque 3 km long bay, located 10 km northwest from Dubrovnik. The hamlets around it are: Zaton Veliki, Zaton Mali, Stikovica and Vrbica, all of which are part of the settlement of Zaton.

The Renaissance summer manors of former Dubrovnik aristocracy are historical sites which characterize Zaton bay as a Dubrovnik summer manor region. Noble families Gučetić, Menčetić, Sorkochević, Saraka and Lukarevich have built their summer cottages around the bay.

== See also ==
- Croatia
- Dubrovnik
- Dalmatia
