= Crisostomo Arameo =

Bishop of Ston

Most Reverend Crisostomo Arameo
- Bishop of Ston
- Church: Catholic Church
- Diocese: Diocese of Ston
- In office: 1585–1605
- Predecessor: Basilio Gradi
- Successor: Giovanni Battista Giorgi

Personal details
- Died: Ston, Croatia

Crisostomo Arameo, O.S.B. (died 1605) was a Roman Catholic prelate who served as Bishop of Ston (1585–1605).

== Biography ==
Crisostomo Arameo was ordained a priest in the Order of Saint Benedict. On 18 March 1585, he was appointed by Pope Gregory XIII as Bishop of Ston. He served as Bishop of Ston until his death in 1605.

Catholic Church titles
Preceded by Basilio Gradi	Bishop of Ston; 1585–1605	Succeeded by Giovanni Battista Giorgi
