= Giovanni Battista Giorgi =

Most Reverend Giovanni Battista Giorgi
- Bishop of Ston
- Church: Catholic Church
- Diocese: Diocese of Ston
- In office: 1606–1608
- Predecessor: Crisostomo Arameo
- Successor: Michael Rezzi

Personal details
- Born: 1536 Raguse
- Died: 24 November 1608 (aged 71–72) Ston, Croatia

Giovanni Battista Giorgi, O.S.B. (1536 – 24 November 1608) was a Roman Catholic prelate who served as Bishop of Ston (1606–1608).

== Biography ==
Giovanni Battista Giorgi was born in Raguse and ordained a priest in the Order of Saint Benedict. On 14 August 1606, he was appointed by Pope Paul V as Bishop of Ston. He served as Bishop of Ston until his death on 24 November 1608.

Catholic Church titles
Preceded by Crisostomo Arameo	Bishop of Ston; 1606–1608	Succeeded by Michael Rezzi
