= Piero Soderini =

Head of state of Florence from 1498 to 1512

Pier Soderini
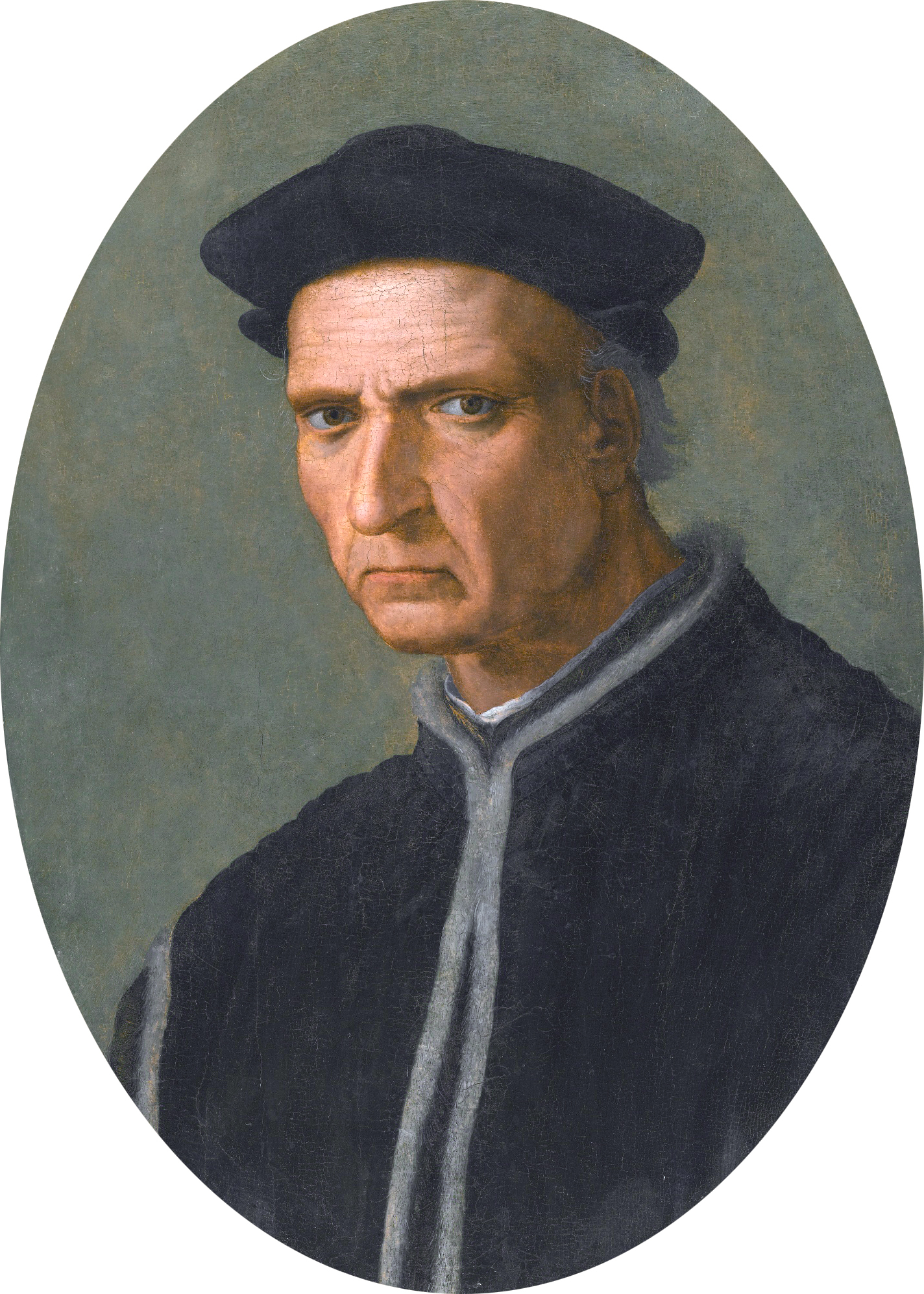
- Piero Soderini by Ridolfo del Ghirlandaio

Head of state of Florence
- Reign: May 1498 – 31 August 1512
- Predecessor: Girolamo Savonarola
- Successor: Giovanni di Lorenzo de' Medici
- Born: 17 March 1451; Florence, Republic of Florence
- Died: 13 June 1522 (aged 71); Rome, Papal States
- Father: Tommaso di Lorenzo Soderini
- Mother: Dianora Tornabuoni

Piero di Tommaso Soderini (March 17, 1451 – June 13, 1522), also known as Pier Soderini, was an Italian statesman of the Republic of Florence.

== Biography ==
Soderini was born in Florence to Tommaso di Lorenzo Soderini, a member of an established family associated with medicine, and his second wife Dianora Tornabuoni, also from a prominent Florentine family and in-law of Piero di Cosimo de' Medici. Soderini's brother was the statesman and supporter of Girolamo Savonarola, Paolo Antonio Soderini. Their third brother was Cardinal Francesco Soderini, bishop of Volterra. In 1481 he was Prior of the city, and later developed political ties with Piero di Lorenzo de' Medici, receiving from him, in 1493, the honour of being the Ambassador to the Kingdom of France. He was elected gonfaloniere for life in 1502 by the Florentines, who wished to give greater stability to their republican institutions, which had been restored after the expulsion of Piero de' Medici and the execution of Savonarola.

Soderini's administration had relatively moderate policies. He introduced a system of national militia in the place of foreign mercenaries. During his government, the long war with Pisa was brought to a close with the capture of that city by the Florentines in 1509. Niccolò Machiavelli, author of The Prince and Discourses on Livy, served under him as second chancellor and as ambassador to Cesare Borgia, Rome and France. Machiavelli's assessment of Soderini's character changed following the events that removed Soderini from power.

Soderini maintained a pro-France political alliance in Italian politics. But in 1512 the Medici returned to Florence with the help of a Spanish army, deposed Soderini, and drove him into exile. He took refuge at Orašac (near Dubrovnik) in Dalmatia, where he remained until the election of Pope Leo X, who summoned him to Rome and extended his patronage to Soderini. Soderini lived in Rome for the remainder of his life and continued to advocate for the welfare of Florence, to which he was never allowed to return.

He died in Rome in 1522 and was buried in the church of S. Maria del Popolo.

== Bibliography ==
- Creighton, Mandell (1887). A History of the Papacy During the Period of the Reformation. Vol. IV: The Italian princes. 1464–1518. London: Longmans, Green. pp. 31, 91, 138–140, 156–160.
- Gelčić, Josip (1894). Piero Soderini profugo a Ragusa: memorie e documenti (in Italian). Ragusa: Carlo Pretner.
- Guicciardini, Francesco (1859). "Chapters 26–33". Storia fiorentina dai tempi di Cosimo de'Medici a quelli del Gonfaloniere Soderini. Opere inedite di F. G., Volume terzo. Firenze: Barbèra, Bianchi e comp. p. 403.
- Landucci, Luca (1883). Jodoco Del Badia (ed.). Diario fiorentino dal 1450 al 1516 (in Italian). G. C. Sansoni. pp. 222–335.
- Razzi, Silvano (1737). Vita di Piero Soderini gonfaloniere perpetuo della repubblica fiorentina (in Italian). Padova: Stamperia del Seminario.
- Schevill, Ferdinand (1963). Medieval and Renaissance Florence. Vol. II. New York: Harper & Row. pp. 461–470.
- Zaccaria, Raffaella. "Soderini, Piero". Dizionario Biografico degli Italiani. Treccani.

=== Acknowledgment ===
- This work in turn cites:
  - Silvano Razzi, Vita di Pier Soderini (Padua, 1737)
