= Vid Vuletić Vukasović =

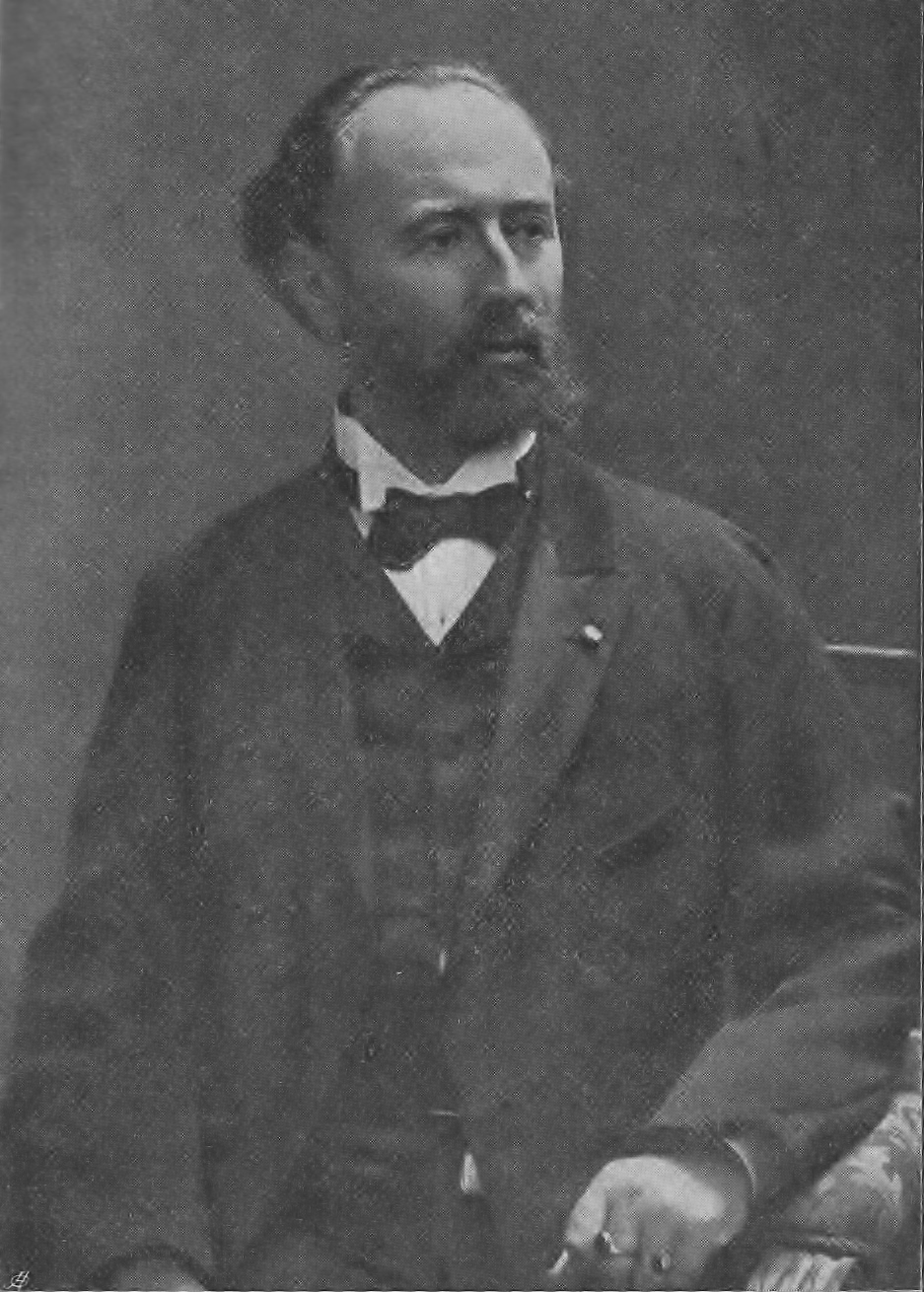
- Born: 16 December 1853; Brsečine
- Died: 10 July 1933 (aged 79); Dubrovnik
- Occupation: Historian

Vid Vuletić Vukasović (Serbian Cyrillic: Вид Вулетић Вукасовић; 16 December 1853 - 10 July 1933) was a writer and early ethnographer from Dubrovnik. He was part of the Serb-Catholic movement in Dubrovnik.

== Biography ==
Born in 1853 in Brsečine near Dubrovnik, Vukasović came from a renowned family from Gradac, a small village near Neum in Herzegovina, where his relatives, at the time of the Herzegovina Uprising, fought against the Ottoman Empire. He was baptized in the Roman Catholic Church.

Vukasović was a teacher by training, and worked as a teacher in Korčula, then as a professor in the Dubrovnik women's teacher school, and retired as a consultant in the latter institution.

He worked as a historian and collector of folklore and ethnography. Vukasović was an associate of most relevant Dubrovnik newspapers and magazines of his time, amongst them Slovinci, Javor, Dawn, Dubrovnik, Ivy and Kašiković's Bosnian villas and Miković's Serbian magazine.

Dionizije Miković praised Vukasović's personal library.

In 1907 he became a correspondent of the Serbian Royal Academy.

He died in Dubrovnik, Kingdom of Yugoslavia (now Croatia).

== Works ==
- Bilješke o kulturi južnijeh Slavena, osobito Srbalja, Dubrovnik: Naklada Srpske Dubrovačke Štamparije A. Pasarića, 1897. 240 pages

== Sources ==
- Vuletić-Vukasović, Vid (G. Tomović, p. 319), Enciklopedija srpske istoriografije, Belgrade 1997
