= Basilio Gradi =

Roman Catholic bishop of Ston 1584–1585 (died 1585)

Most Reverend Basilio Gradi
- Bishop of Ston
- Church: Catholic Church
- Diocese: Diocese of Ston
- In office: 1564–1582
- Predecessor: Boniface of Ragusa
- Successor: Crisostomo Arameo

Orders
- Consecration: 6 May 1584 by Thomas Goldwell

Personal details
- Died: 1585 Ston, Croatia

Basilio Gradi, O.S.B. (died 1585) was a Roman Catholic prelate who served as Bishop of Ston (1584–1585).

== Biography ==
Basilio Gradi was ordained a priest in the Order of Saint Benedict. On 14 March 1584, he was appointed by Pope Gregory XIII as Bishop of Ston. On 6 May 1584, he was consecrated bishop by Thomas Goldwell, Bishop of Saint Asaph with Giovanni Battista Santorio, Bishop of Alife, and Ignazio Danti, Bishop of Alatri, as co-consecrators. He served as Bishop of Ston until his death in 1585.

Catholic Church titles
Preceded by Boniface of Ragusa	Bishop of Ston; 1584–1585	Succeeded by Crisostomo Arameo
