= Boniface of Ragusa =

Boniface of Ragusa (c. 1504 in Lopud – 6 February 1582 in Timișoara) was a Franciscan Custos of the Holy Land in Jerusalem, writer, who served as Bishop of Ston (1564–1582).

== Biography ==
Destefanis' other names include Bonifacije Stefanić Drakolica, Darcoliza, Drakolica, Crassa, Grassa, Ragusinus, Stephani, Drkoličić and Stjepanović.

Destefanis was ordained a priest in the Order of Friars Minor. Destefanis participated at the Council of Trent In 1551–1559 and 1564, he was Custodian of the Holy Land. Allegedly, he participated in the last time the Holy Sepulchre was opened in 1555. He obtained permission to restore parts of the Church of the Holy Sepulchre and to build a completely new edicule. This was a major restoration project, and the Franciscan left a detailed description of the work carried out. On 17 Nov 1564, he was appointed by Pope Pius IV as Bishop of Ston. In 1580 Destefanis, accompanied by Bartol Sfondrati, was appointed as apostolic visitor and delegate to Dalmatia, Herzegovina, Bosnia, Croatia, Vallachia, Slavonia, Serbia and other European territories governed by the Ottomans. Before this trip, based on the Pope's instructions, Destefanis visited the Franciscan province in Bosnia. On 15 December 1580 Destefanis reported to Rome that he met the bishop of Smederevo, fra Nikola Ugrinović, during his journey to Bosnia. Since there were only five Catholic families in Smederevo, Destefanis proposed to move Ugrinović to Skradin.

He served as Bishop of Ston until he died in 1582.

== Works ==
- De perenni Cultu Terrae Sanctae (1555), Venice 1572
- Liber De perenni Cultu Terrae Sanctae Et De Fructuosa eius Peregrinatione, Venice 1573

== Sources ==
- Zorić, Damir (2002). Ferdinand Konšćak: misionar i istraživač. Nakladni zavod Matice hrvatske. ISBN 978-953-185-063-6.
- Podružnica (2002). Scrinia Slavonica: godišnjak Podružnice za povijest Slavonije, Srijema i Baranje Hrvatskog instituta za povijest. Podružnica za povijest Slavonije, Srijema i Baranje Hrvatskog instituta za povijest.
- Posilović, Znanstveni Skup Pavao (2001). Zbornik o Pavlu Posiloviću: zbornik radova sa znanstvenoga skupa "Pavao Posilović i šibensko-skradinski kraj u njegovo doba", Skradin - Visovac, 27.-28.listopada 2000. Gradska knjižnica Juraj Šižgorić. ISBN 978-953-6163-59-5.
- Hoško, Franjo Emanuel (2001). Franjevci i poslanje Crkve u kontinentalnoj Hrvatskoj. Kršćanska sadašnjost. ISBN 9789531513975.
- Turčinović, Josip (1985). Samostan Male braće u Dubrovniku. Kršćanska sadašnjost.

Catholic Church titles
Preceded by Bonaventura Corsetti	Custodian of the Holy Land; 1551–1559	Succeeded by Antonio da Bergamo
Preceded by Aurelio da Griano	Custodian of the Holy Land; 1564	Succeeded by Bernardino da Collestate
Preceded by Pietro de Gozzo	Bishop of Ston; 1564–1582	Succeeded by Basilio Gradi
