= Gučetić =

Noble family of the Republic of Ragusa

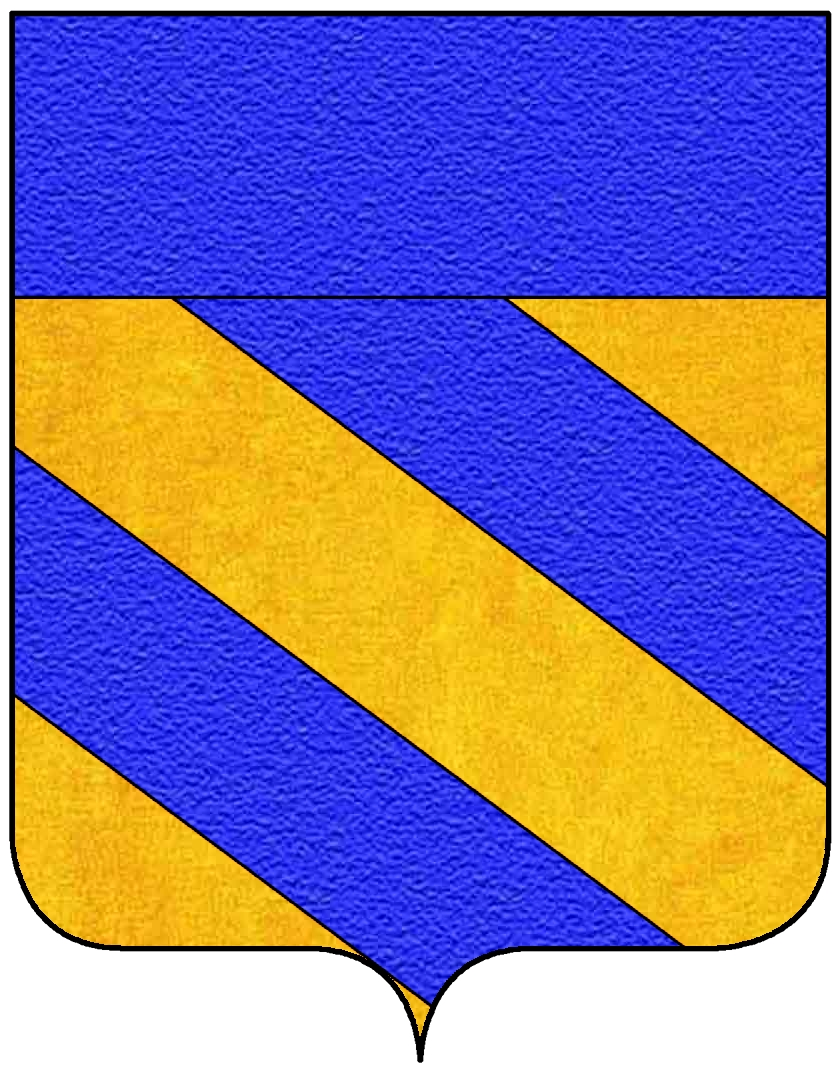
Coat of arms of Gučetić family

The Gučetić or Gozze are an old noble family of the Republic of Ragusa. Today its members carry the titles of count.

== History ==
According to some historical works, they were original settlers of the republic and their family tree can be traced back to the 10th century making them one of Europe's oldest noble families.

== Members ==
- Dživo Gučetić (1451–1502), writer
- Petar Gučetić, bishop of Ston (1551–1564)
- Nikola Vitov Gučetić (1549–1610), scientist
- Klement Gucetić
- Gauges de Gozze
- Georgius Gozze
- Vladislav Gozze (fl. 1817)
- Francesco Paolo Gozze
- Bazzioli di Gozze
- Carlo Gozzi

== Gučetić, Austrian house ==
In the manual of the aristocracy, encyclopedia, 1978, volume IV, the following entry is found:

Gučetić Kath. - Patricians from Dubrovnik. - and Hungarian ones. Title of Counts with “de Trebinje et Popovo” suffixes Vienna 23.4.1687 (for Lucas, Raphael and Nikola Gučetić); Austrian Aristocracy confirmation on 10.11.1817 (for Raphael Johann Gučetić, Patrizier of Dubrovnik); Austrian Confirmation as a “Count of Trebinje and Popovo” 31.5.1818 (for the brothers and cousins Johann Nicolaus, Lucas Nicoloaus, Lucas Maria, Paul Wladislaus, Wladislaus Franz and Paul Franz Gučetić); Austrian Aristocracy and coat of arms confirmation by A.E of 16.6.1835, diploma… 27.8.1836 (for Melkior Gučetić).

In the book: Condition increases and grace document for the German Reich and Austrian hereditary country until 1806… of Karl the Friedrich v. franc on lock Senftenegg, 1970, the following is noted:

Gučetić, Raphael Johann de, Patrizier of Dubrovnik, AdBest., 10.XI 1817, Gučetić, Paul de, son of the Wladislaus, Lucas, Lucas Maria, Johann, Paul, Söhne of the Nikola Vladislav, count title as a "Count von Trebinje and Popovo", 31.V.1818.

In the manual of the aristocracy, Gräfliche Häuser, volume XI, 1983, the genealogy of the counts Gučetić is published. After this 1983 nearly all family members live in Dubrovnik in addition in Erftstadt Gymnich.

Some of the last descendants were:

- Nikola or Nikša (born in Trieste on 26 April 1906), attorney, married in Dubrovnik on 19 April 1937 to Erna Bayer (born 14 July 1911), they had 4 children:
  - Magdalena or Magda (born 17 May 1941)
  - Marin or Marino (born 30 October 1944), stage designer
  - Nikoleta or Nika (born 24 June 1949)
  - Orsat or Medo (born 27 March 1954), musician

Count Orsat Gučetić lived in Erftstadt Gymnich in 1983 and Count Marin Gučetić lived 1983 in Zagreb Sopot II. In the entrance text in the manual of the aristocracy is mentioned: They are the last ones of the genealogy (with further lines): Gotha gfl. Taschb.1872. The family is known for erecting the oldest arboretum in the world, in Trsteno near Dubrovnik.

A branch of the family settled in Venice in the 17th century, where they changed their name from Gučetić to "Gozzi". Carlo Gozzi (1720–1806) became famous as a writer, as well as his brother Gasparo (1713–1786). The last descendant of this branch is the Marquis Giorgio Gozzi, who in 1981 wrote a book dedicated to his distant roots: The free and sovereign Republic of Ragusa, 634-1814.

== See also ==
- Republic of Ragusa
- Dubrovnik
- Dalmatia
- Post-Roman patriciates

== Bibliography ==
- Gučetić, Genealogie der Gesamtfamilie (Grafen), GAB, Jahrgang 1865, 1872
- Gučetić, Genealogie der Grafenfamilie, GAQ, Band XI, Ausgabe von 1983 Stammreihe
- Gučetić, Kurzueberblick zur Adelsfamilie (von 1978) mit Wappenbeschreibung, GAX, Band IV., Seite 217
- Gučetić, Grafen v., gedruckte Genealogie, GAQ, Band XVII. (2003), Seite 158-161
- Gučetić v.Trebinje und Popovo, Grafen, Wappenabbildung (schwarz-weiss) als Stich aus dem 19.Jahrhundert, NAB, Band II. (von 1887), Seite 273 und Anhangstext auf Seite LXIV
