= Giovanni Battista Natali (bishop) =

Most Reverend Giovanni Battista Natali
- Bishop of Ston
- Church: Catholic Church
- Diocese: Diocese of Ston
- In office: 1683–1687
- Predecessor: Agostino Flavio Macedonich
- Successor: Carlo Olantes

Personal details
- Born: 1628 Ragusa
- Died: 4 Aug 1687 (age 59) Ston, Croatia

Giovanni Battista Natali (1628-1687) was a Roman Catholic prelate who served as Bishop of Ston (1683–1687).

== Biography ==
Giovanni Battista Natali was born in Ragusa and ordained a priest in the Order of Preachers. On 15 Nov 1683, he was appointed by Pope Innocent XI as Bishop of Ston. He served as Bishop of Ston until his death on 4 August 1687.

== See also ==
- Catholic Church in Croatia

Catholic Church titles
Preceded by Agostino Flavio Macedonich	Bishop of Ston; 1683–1687	Succeeded by Carlo Olantes
