= Ludovico Giamagna =

Most Reverend Ludovico Giamagna
- Bishop of Ston
- Church: Catholic Church
- Diocese: Diocese of Ston
- In office: 1632–1634
- Predecessor: Ambrogio Gozzeo
- Successor: Paolo de Gratiis

Personal details
- Born: 1594 Ragusa
- Died: July 1634 (age 40) Ston, Croatia

Ludovico Giamagna, O.P. (1594–1634) was a Roman Catholic prelate who served as Bishop of Ston (1632–1634).

== Biography ==
Ludovico Giamagna was born in Ragusa and ordained a priest in the Order of Preachers. On 24 Nov 1632, he was appointed by Pope Urban VIII as Bishop of Ston. He served as Bishop of Ston until his death in July 1634.

Catholic Church titles
Preceded by Ambrogio Gozzeo	Bishop of Ston; 1632–1634	Succeeded by Paolo de Gratiis
