= Paolo de Gratiis =

Most Reverend Paolo de Gratiis
- Bishop of Ston
- Church: Catholic Church
- Diocese: Diocese of Ston
- In office: 1635–1652
- Predecessor: Ludovico Giamagna
- Successor: Carlo Giuliani (bishop)

Personal details
- Died: 1652 Ston, Croatia

Paolo de Gratiis (died 1652) was a Roman Catholic prelate who served as Bishop of Ston (1635–1652).

On 9 July 1635, Paolo de Gratiis was appointed by Pope Urban VIII as Bishop of Ston. He served as Bishop of Ston until his death in 1652.

Catholic Church titles
Preceded by Ludovico Giamagna	Bishop of Ston; 1635–1652	Succeeded by Carlo Giuliani (bishop)
