= Francesco Falabella =

Roman Catholic prelate

Most Reverend Francesco Falabella
- Archbishop of Santa Severina
- Church: Catholic Church
- Archdiocese: Archdiocese of Santa Severina
- In office: 1660–1670
- Predecessor: Gian Antonio Paravicini
- Successor: Giuseppe Palermo

Orders
- Consecration: 11 April 1660 by Marcello Santacroce

Personal details
- Born: 1599 Lagoni Policastro, Italy
- Died: June 1670 (age 71) Santa Severina, Italy

Francesco Falabella (1599–1670) was a Roman Catholic prelate, who served as Archbishop of Santa Severina from 1660 to 1670.

== Biography ==
Francesco Falabella was born in Lagoni Policastro, Italy in 1599, and on 5 April 1660, he was appointed during the papacy of Pope Alexander VII as Archbishop of Santa Severina. On 11 April 1660, he was consecrated bishop Marcello Santacroce, Bishop of Tivoli, with Giuseppe Ciantes, Bishop Emeritus of Marsico Nuovo, and Giovanni Agostino Marliani, Bishop Emeritus of Accia and Mariana, serving as co-consecrators. He served as Archbishop of Santa Severina until his death in June 1670.

== External links and additional sources ==
- Cheney, David M. "Archdiocese of Santa Severina". Catholic-Hierarchy.org. (for Chronology of Bishops) ^{[self-published]}
- Chow, Gabriel. "Archdiocese of Santa Severina". GCatholic.org. (for Chronology of Bishops) ^{[self-published]}

Catholic Church titles
Preceded by Gian Antonio Paravicini	Archbishop of Santa Severina; 1660–1670	Succeeded by Giuseppe Palermo
