= Tommaso Malombra =

Most Reverend Tommaso Malombra
- Bishop of Ston
- Church: Catholic Church
- Diocese: Diocese of Ston
- In office: 1463–1513
- Successor: Nicolò Niconisi

Personal details
- Died: 1613 Ston, Croatia

Tommaso Malombra (died 1513) was a Roman Catholic prelate who served as Bishop of Ston (1463–1513).

== Biography ==
On 7 Feb 1463, Tommaso Malombra was appointed by Pope Pius II as Bishop of Ston. He served as Bishop of Ston until his death in 1513.

Catholic Church titles
Preceded by	Bishop of Ston; 1463–1513	Succeeded by Nicolò Niconisi
