= Orašac, Croatia =

Village in Croatia

Orašac
- Settlement
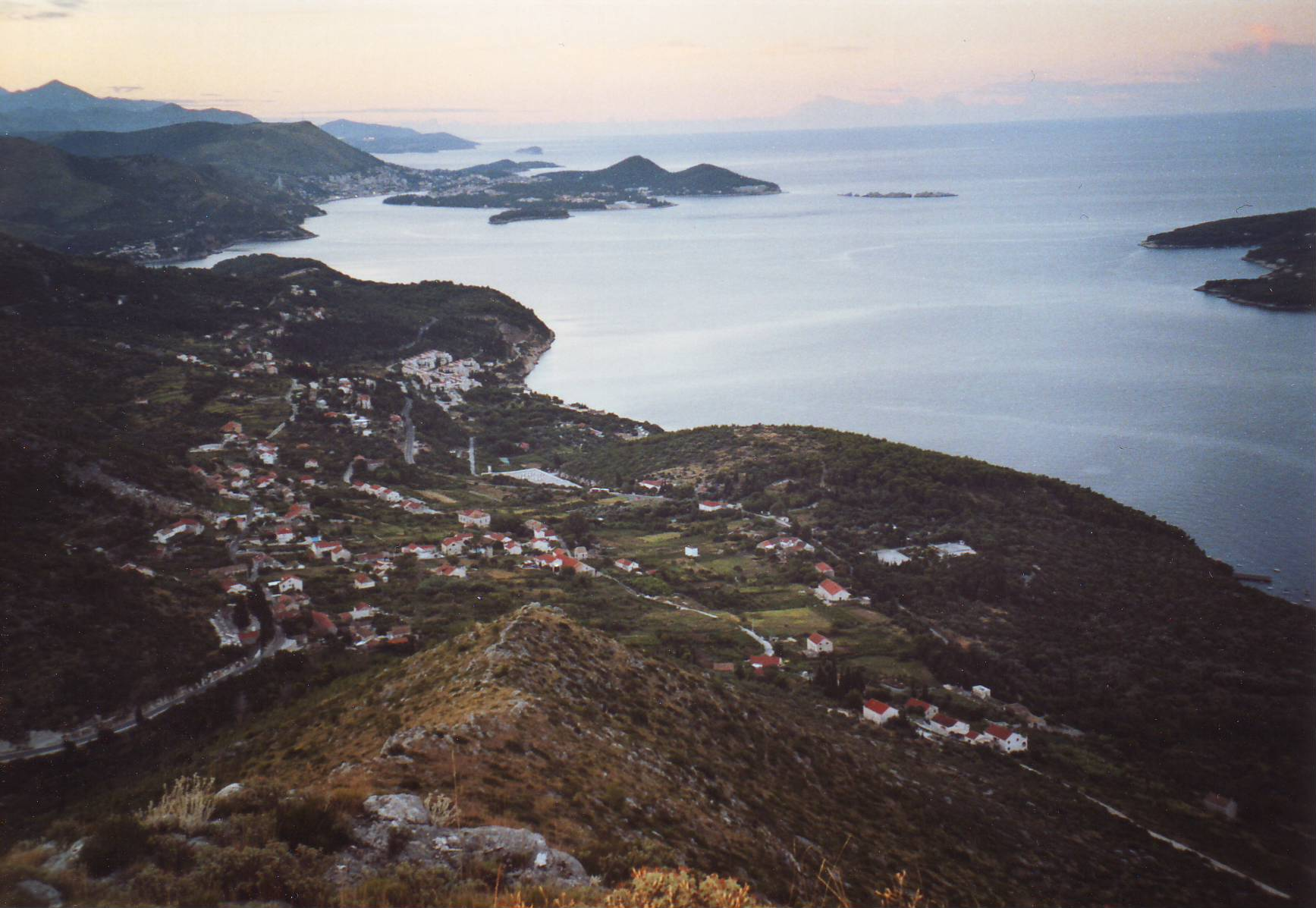
- Aerial view of Orašac

- Location within Croatia
- Coordinates: 42°42′01″N 18°00′44″E
- Country: Croatia
- County: Dubrovnik-Neretva County
- Municipality: Dubrovnik

Area
  - Total: 5.8 km^{2} (2.2 sq mi)

Population (2021)
  - Total: 742
  - Density: 130/km^{2} (330/sq mi)
- Time zone: UTC+1 (CET)
  - Summer (DST): UTC+2 (CEST)
- Postal code: 20235 Zaton Veliki

Orašac is a village in southern Croatia, administratively located in the City of Dubrovnik. It is located between Trsteno and Zaton, northwest of Dubrovnik.

== History ==
This village was founded around AD 1040. In the centre of the town the houses are built close to each other. This once was a means of protection from the Narentines. The village's ancient buildings include a church built in 1250 and dedicated to St Nicholas.

== Villa Soderini and Sun Gardens complex ==
The so-called Villa Soderini, also known as the Arapovo or Arapovo-Morovo castle, is a fortified mansion close to the sea that was built in the 15th century. According to local lore, it was the residence of exiled Florentine leader Piero Soderini in 1512–3 before being recalled to Rome by the newly elected Pope Leo X. The house was renovated in 1967 and became a popular venue for events and concerts during the period of the Croatian Spring, including a performance by popular singer Vice Vukov in 1971 shortly before his exile to France.

A large hotel complex was built on the nearby seafront in 1985, branded Dubrovački vrtovi sunca (lit. 'Dubrovnik Sun Gardens'). During the Croatian War of Independence, the complex was occupied and damaged by forces of the Yugoslav People's Army. Following privatization in the mid-2000s by the Croatian Privatization Fund, the complex was renovated in 2008-2009 and complemented with a development of more than 200 residential apartments. It ran into financial distress, however, and was repossessed in the early 2010s by lender Erste Group Bank, which put it on sale. In 2015, a China-controlled investment group initiated acquisition of the complex for around €90 million. The transaction was completed in March 2017, after which the new owner exited the Radisson Blu franchise and put the Villa Soderini on sale.

== Gallery ==
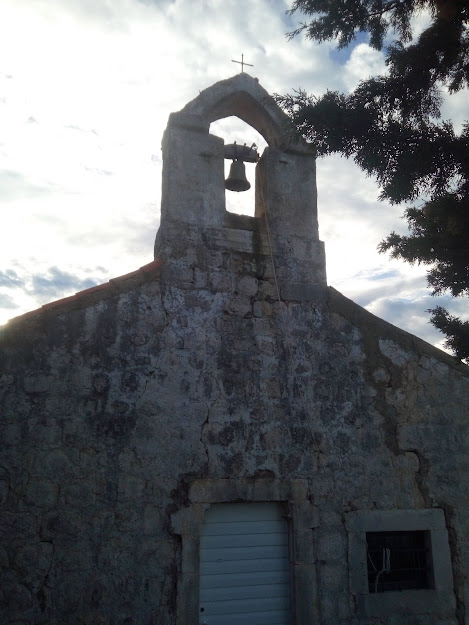
Saint Nicholas church

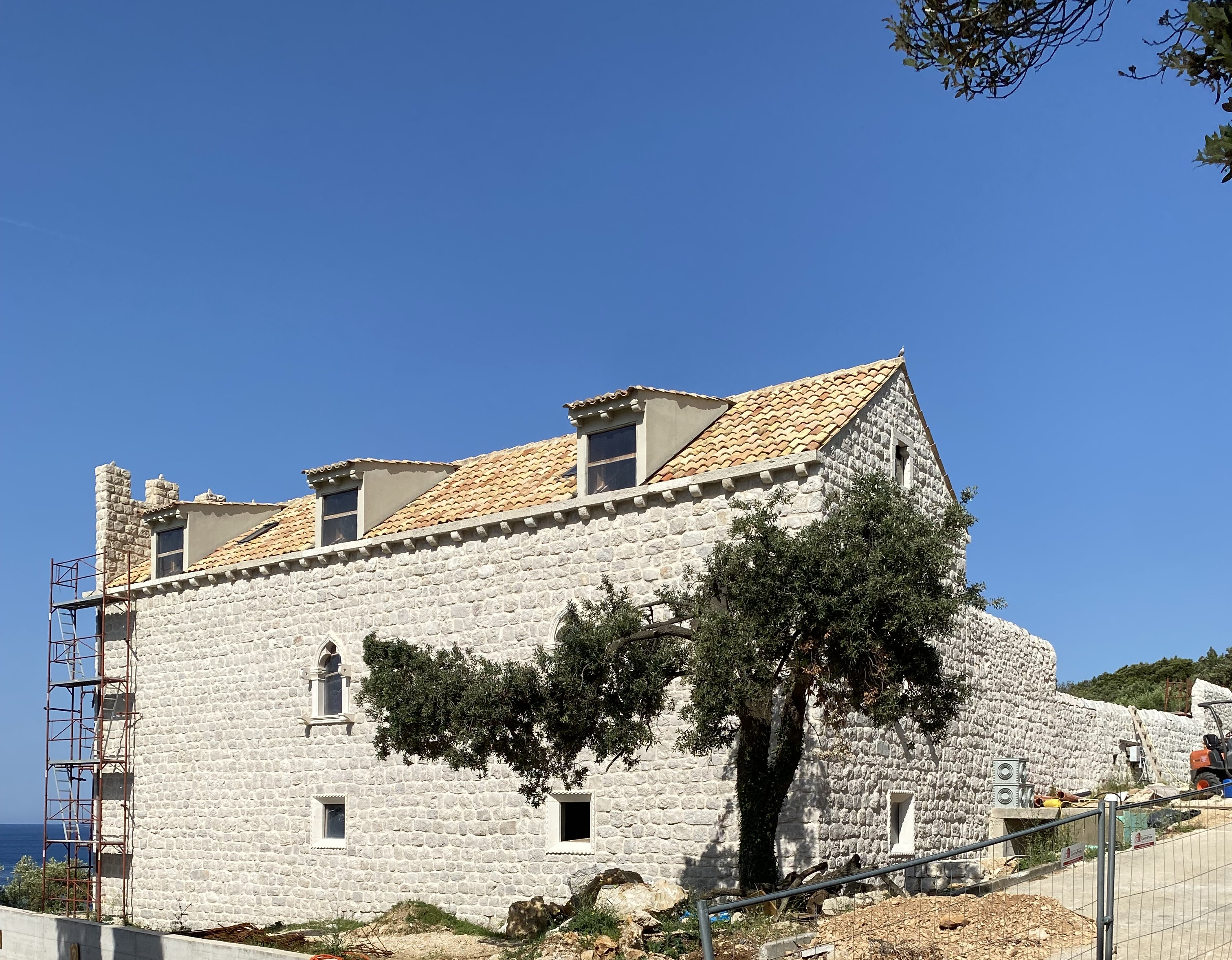
Villa Soderini

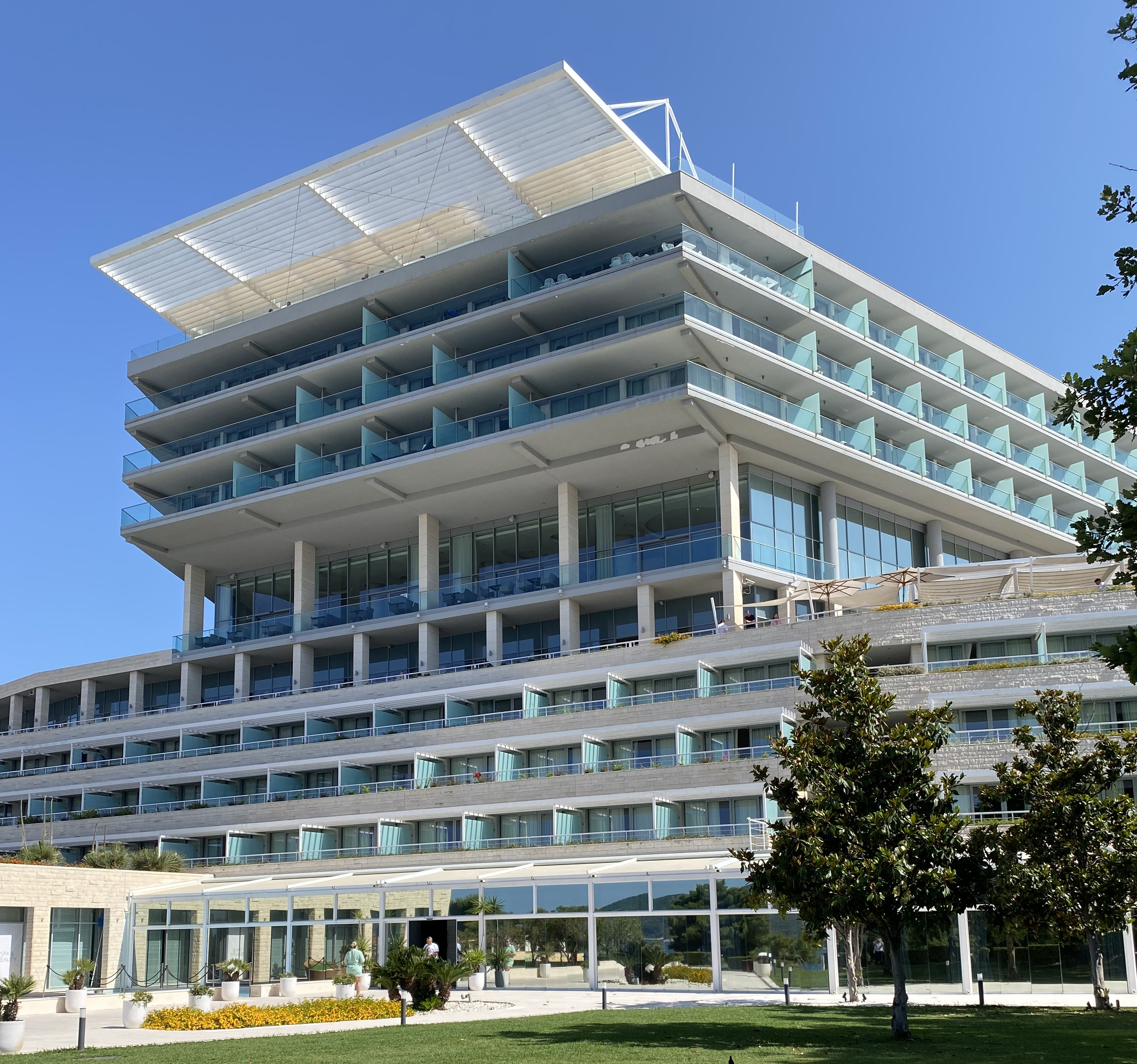
Sun Gardens hotel

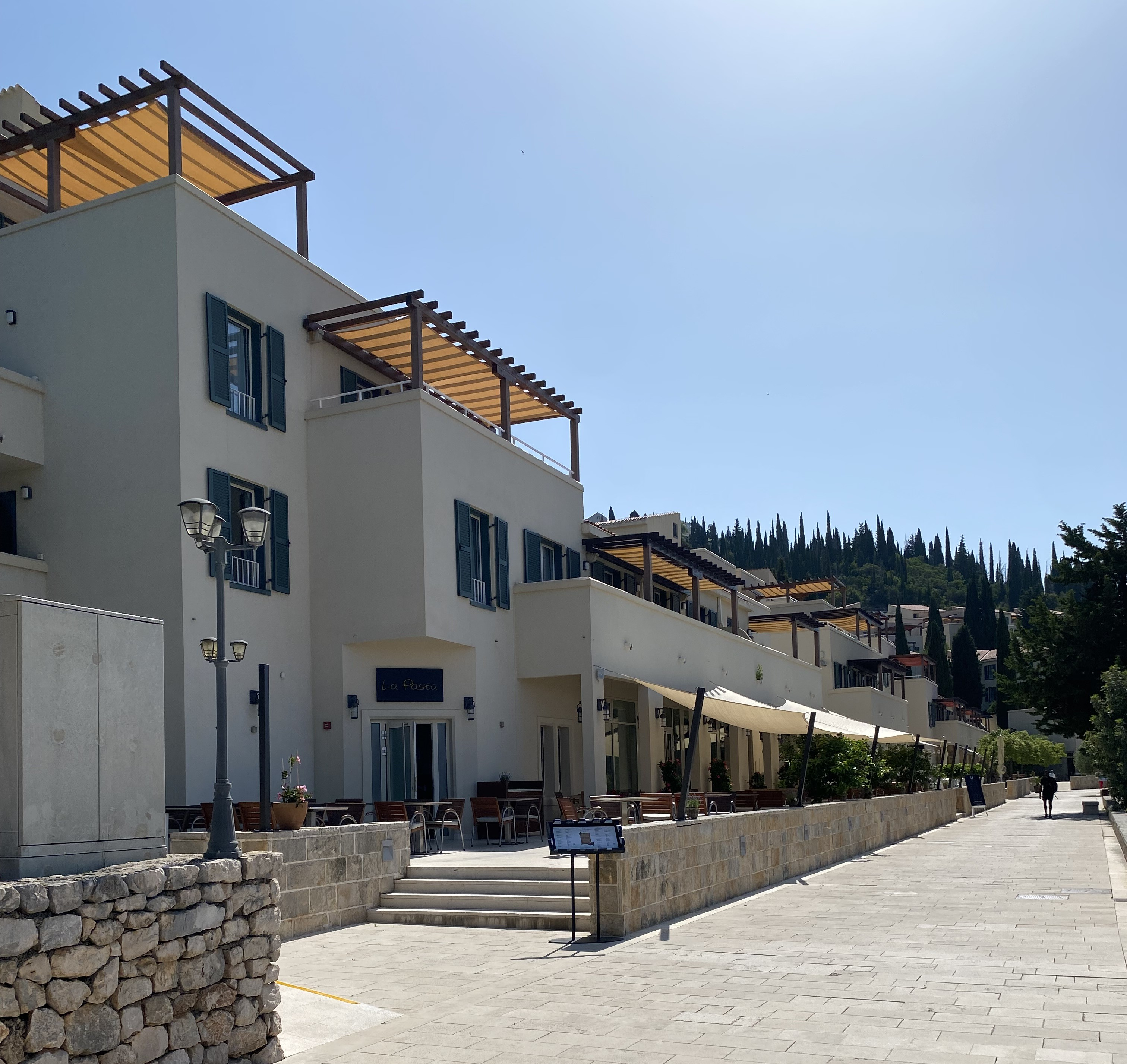
Sun Gardens residences

== Demographics ==
According to the 2021 census, its population was 742.

== See also ==
- Dalmatia
