= Trsteno, Dubrovnik-Neretva County =

Trsteno
- Settlement
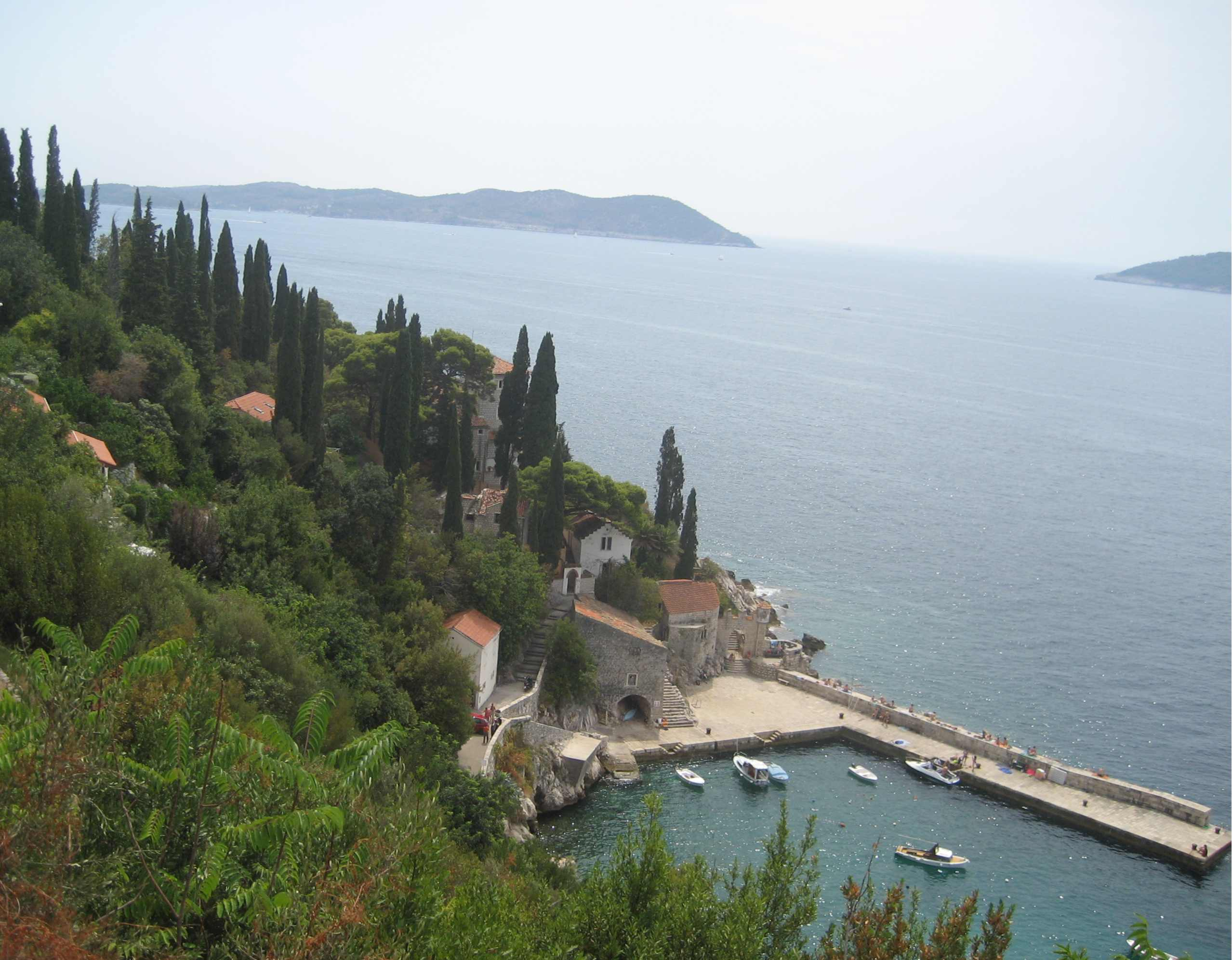
- Interactive map of Trsteno
- Location within Croatia
- Coordinates: 42°42′53″N 17°58′36″E
- Country: Croatia
- County: Dubrovnik-Neretva County
- City: Dubrovnik

Area
  - Total: 4.1 km^{2} (1.6 sq mi)

Population (2021)
  - Total: 215
  - Density: 52/km^{2} (140/sq mi)
- Time zone: UTC+1 (CET)
  - Summer (DST): UTC+2 (CEST)
- Postal code: 20235 Zaton Veliki

Trsteno is a village in southern Croatia, administratively located in the City of Dubrovnik. It is located on the D8 road, between the Orašac and Brsečine.

== Demographics ==
According to the 2021 census, its population was 215.

== Trsteno Arboretum ==
Trsteno is most famous for its arboretum, is the oldest arboretum in this part of the world. The arboretum was erected by the local noble family of Gozze in the late 15th century, who requested ship captains to bring back seeds and plants from their travels. The exact start date for the arboretum is unknown, but it was already in existence by 1492, when a 15 m span aqueduct to irrigate the arboretum was constructed; this aqueduct is still in use. It has been the property of the Croatian Academy of Sciences and Arts since 1948, when it was donated. The Arboretum reserves a very special place among the old Ragusan, Dalmatian and Mediterranean parks. It includes a park surrounding the fifteenth century summer residence, which is a monument of garden architecture, and a nineteenth century park at Drvarica.

The arboretum passed into Yugoslav state ownership in 1945, and was declared a natural rarity in 1948. Since 1950 it has been managed by the Croatian Academy of Sciences and Arts. In 1962 the Arboretum Trsteno was registered in the list of protected natural monuments list as a monument of landscape architecture. The protected area covers around 255,000 square metres.

Trsteno suffered extensive damage and looting during the Croatian War of Independence when on 2 and 3 October 1991, the Yugoslav People's Army launched a series of gunboat and air attacks and set the Arboretum afire, destroying a large part of it, and causing partial damage to the summer residence and the oldest part of the arboretum. The arboretum was further severely damaged in 2000 by a forest fire during a drought, when around 120,000 square metres were lost in fire.

The pride of the arboretum, two Oriental Planes located on the central market place of Trsteno, survived both disasters undamaged. They are over 500 years old and are unique specimens of its kind in Europe. The ancient trees are both about 45/60 m tall and their trunks are 5 m in diameter. Within what was once the noble family's country house, there is the oldest Renaissance park in Croatia, designed in 1502, with numerous exotic plants.

== Climate ==
From 1981 to 2003, the highest temperature recorded at the local weather station was 38.2 °C (100.8 °F), on 4 August 1981. The coldest temperature was −6.5 °C (20.3 °F), on 1 February 1991.

== In popular culture ==
In the third season and fourth season of the television series Game of Thrones, Trsteno and its Arboretum was used as the setting of the Red Keep palace gardens in King's Landing.

== Gallery ==
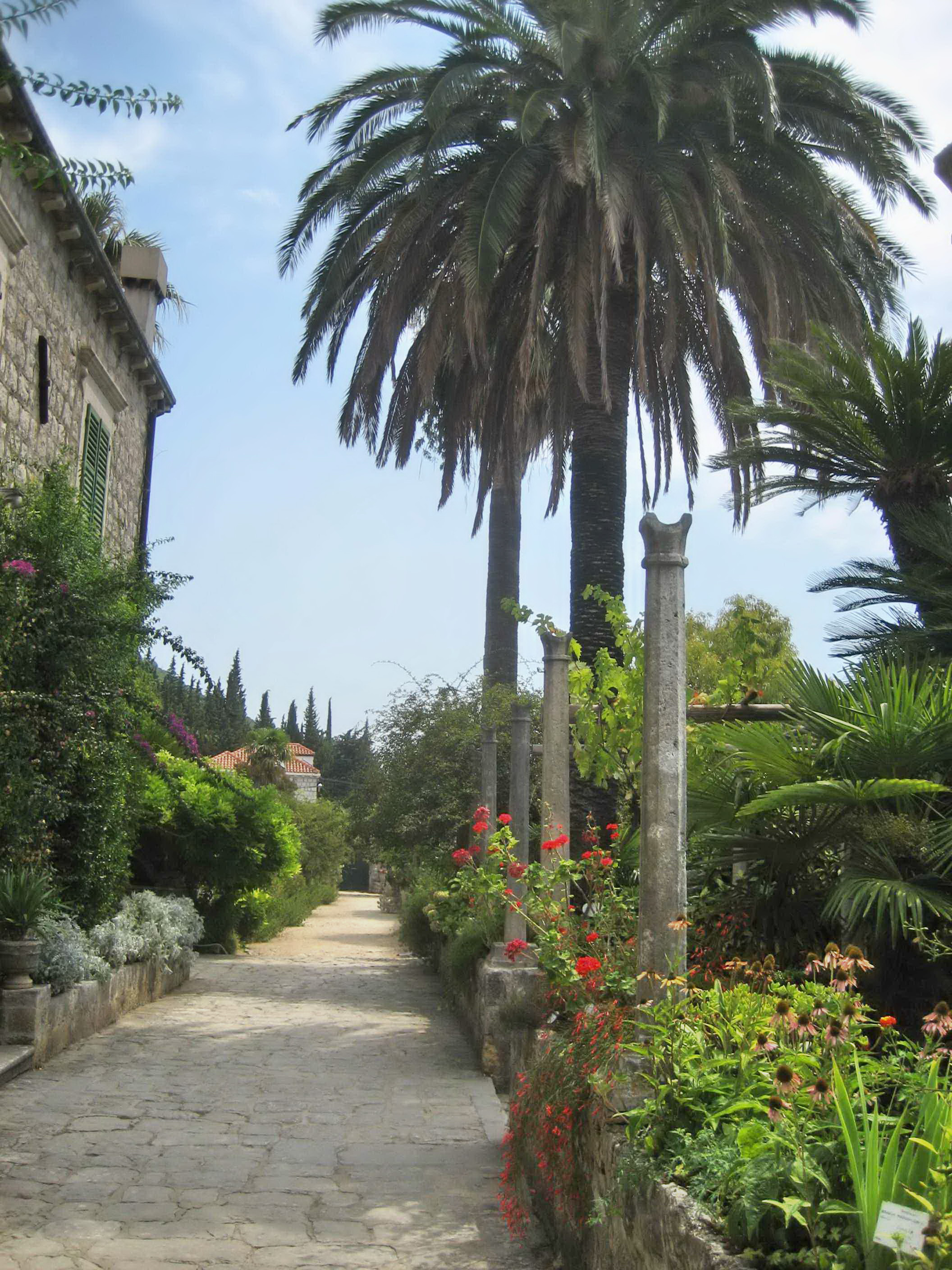
Arboretum Trsteno

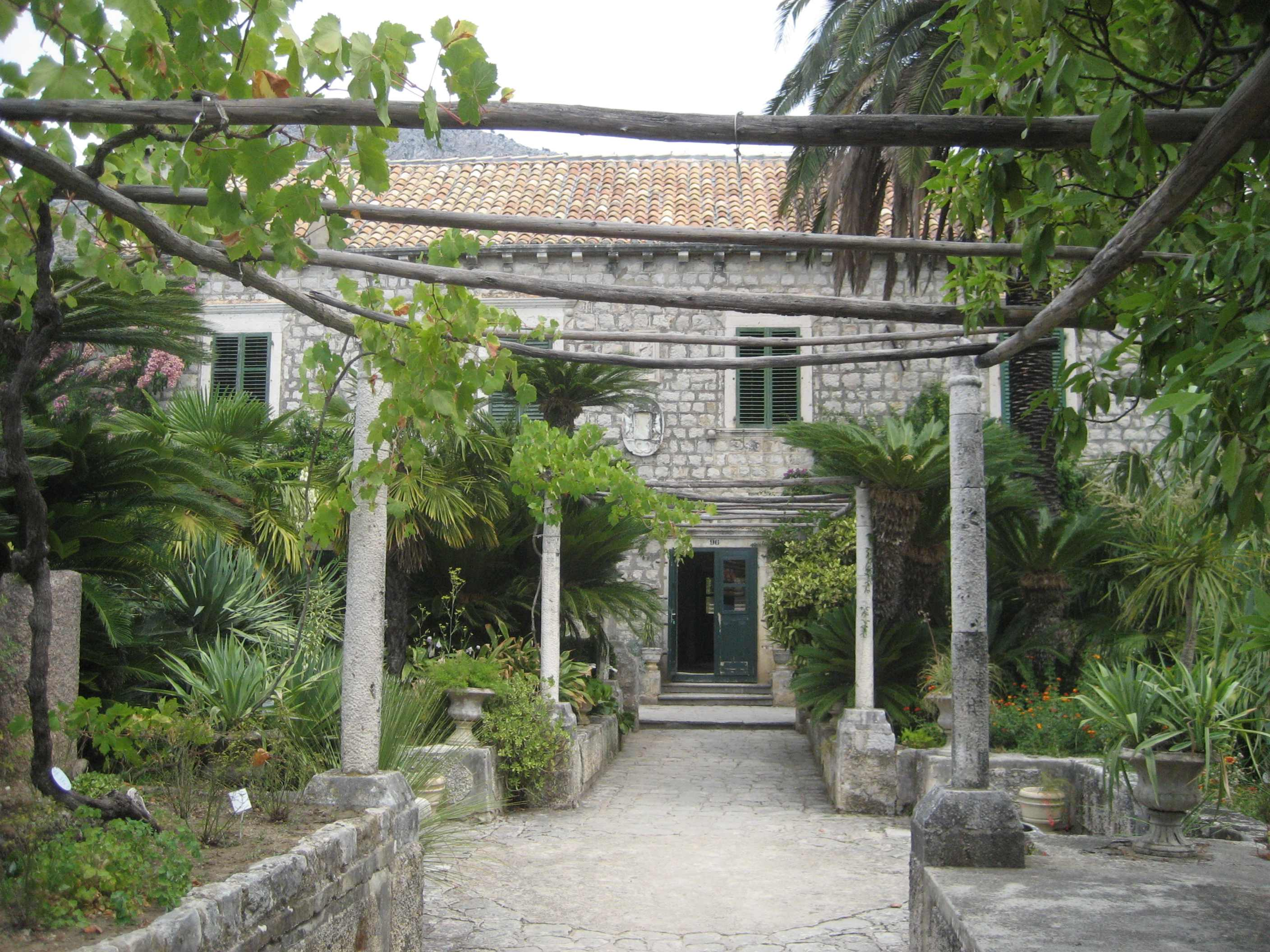
Arboretum Trsteno

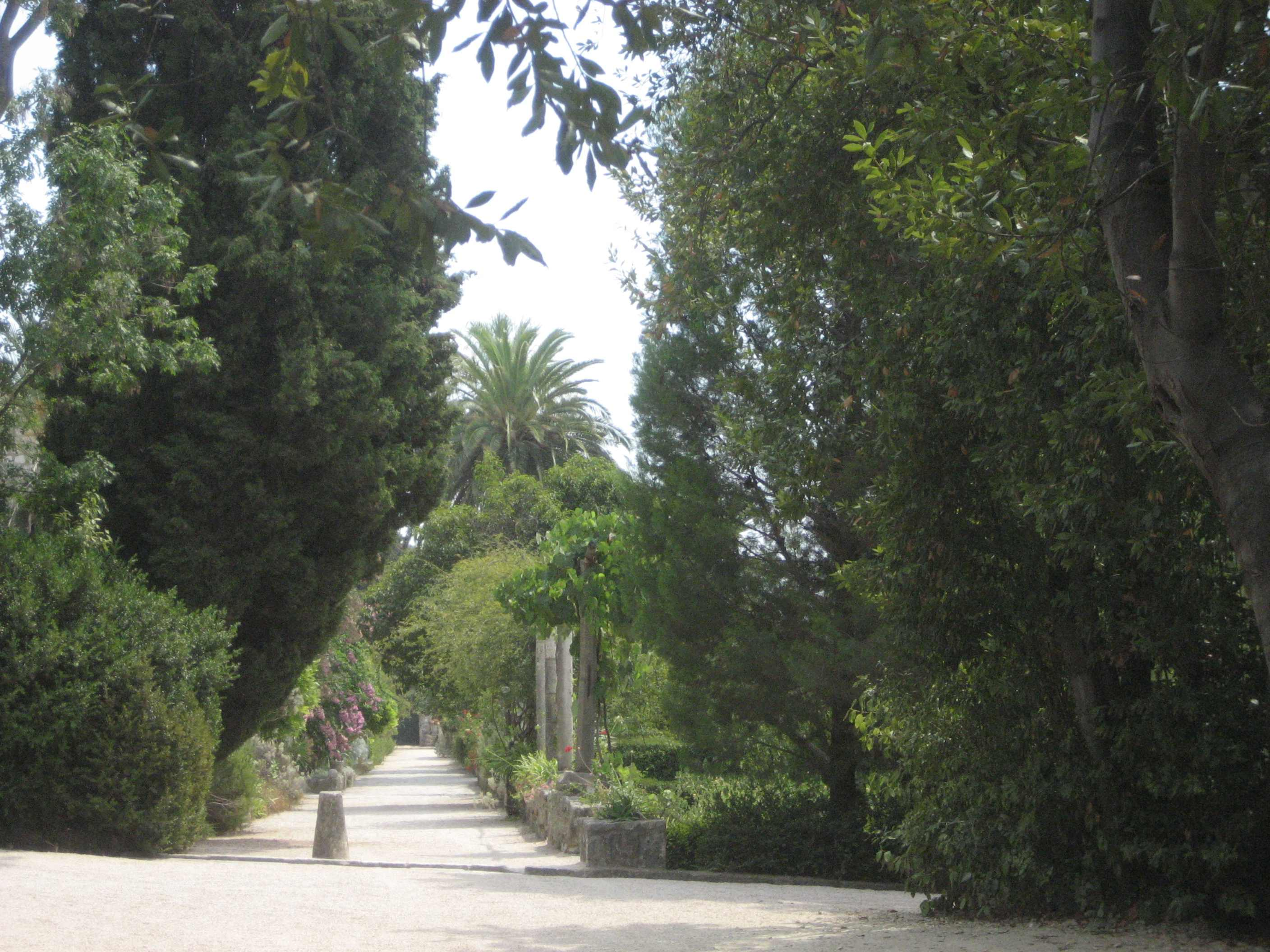
Arboretum Trsteno

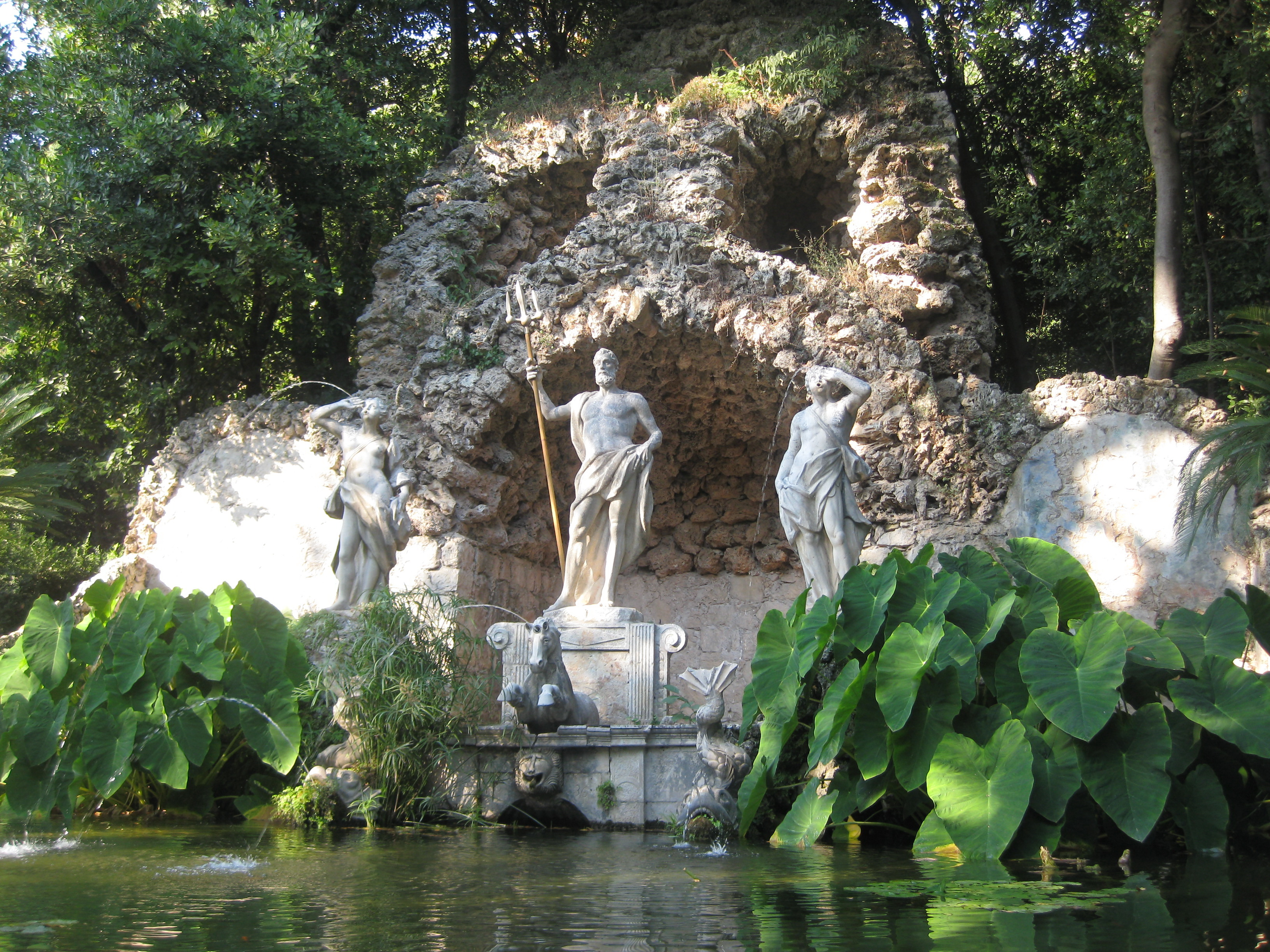
Neptune's fountain in arboretum Trsteno

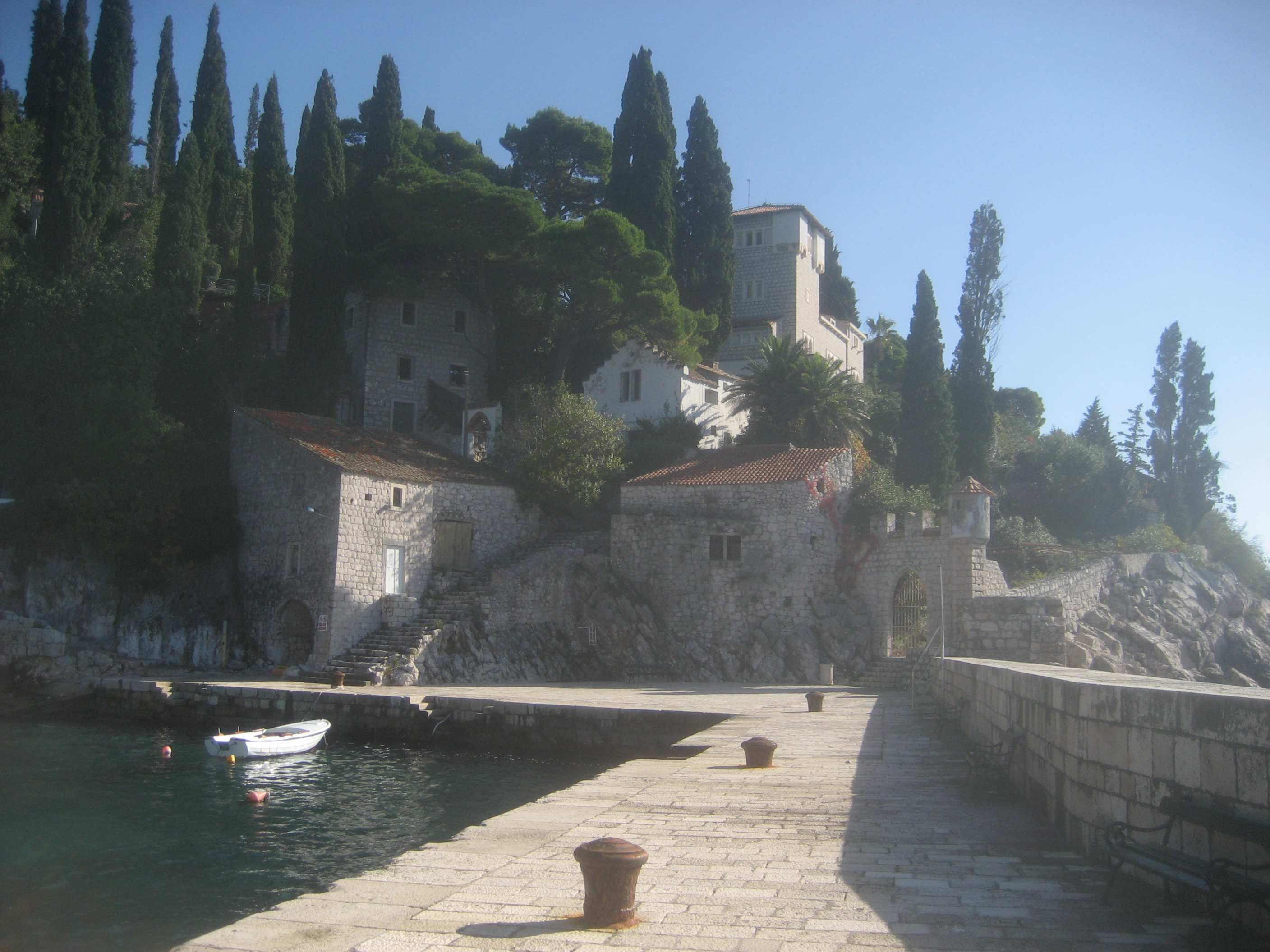
Trsteno pier

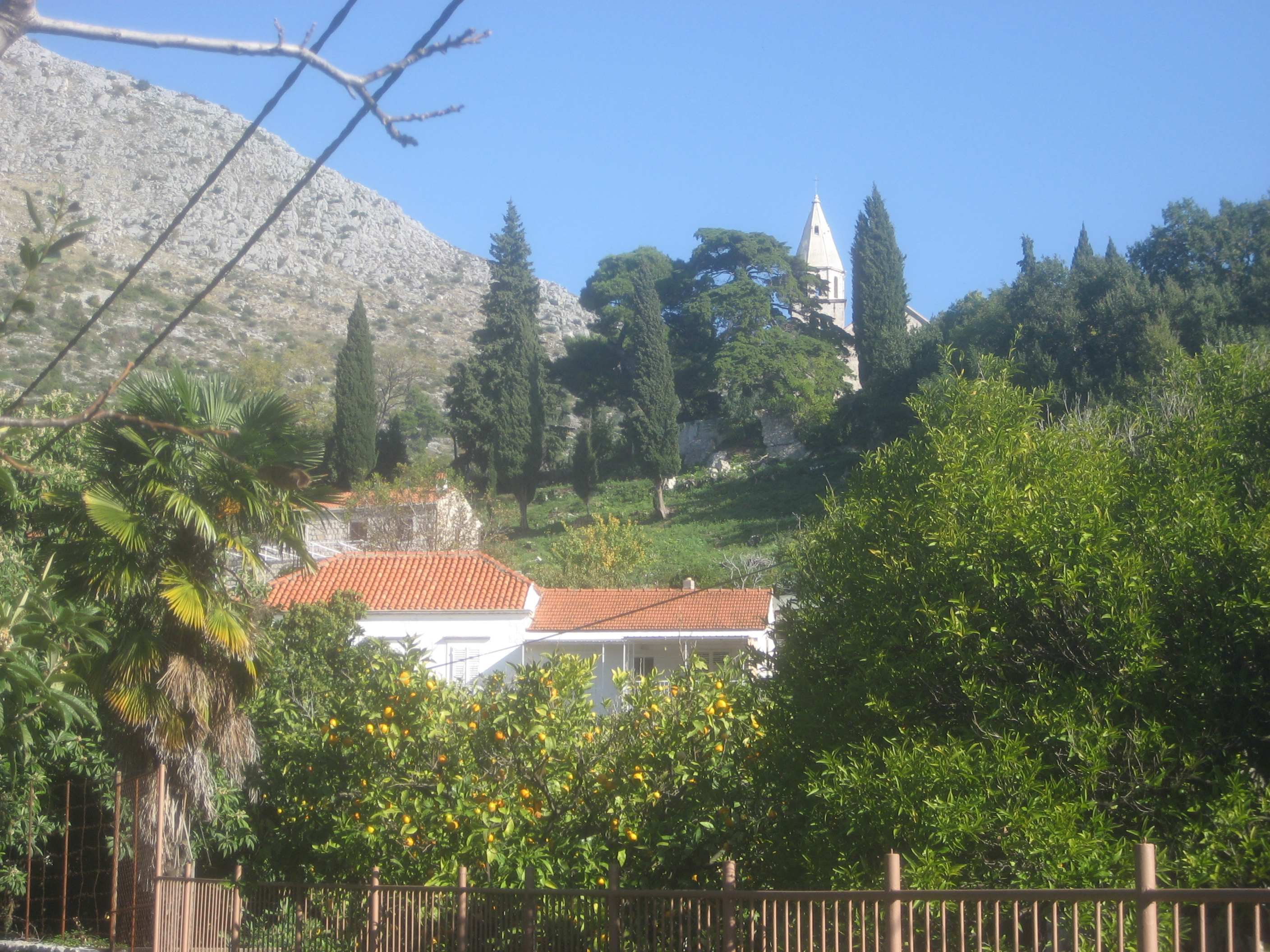
Trsteno

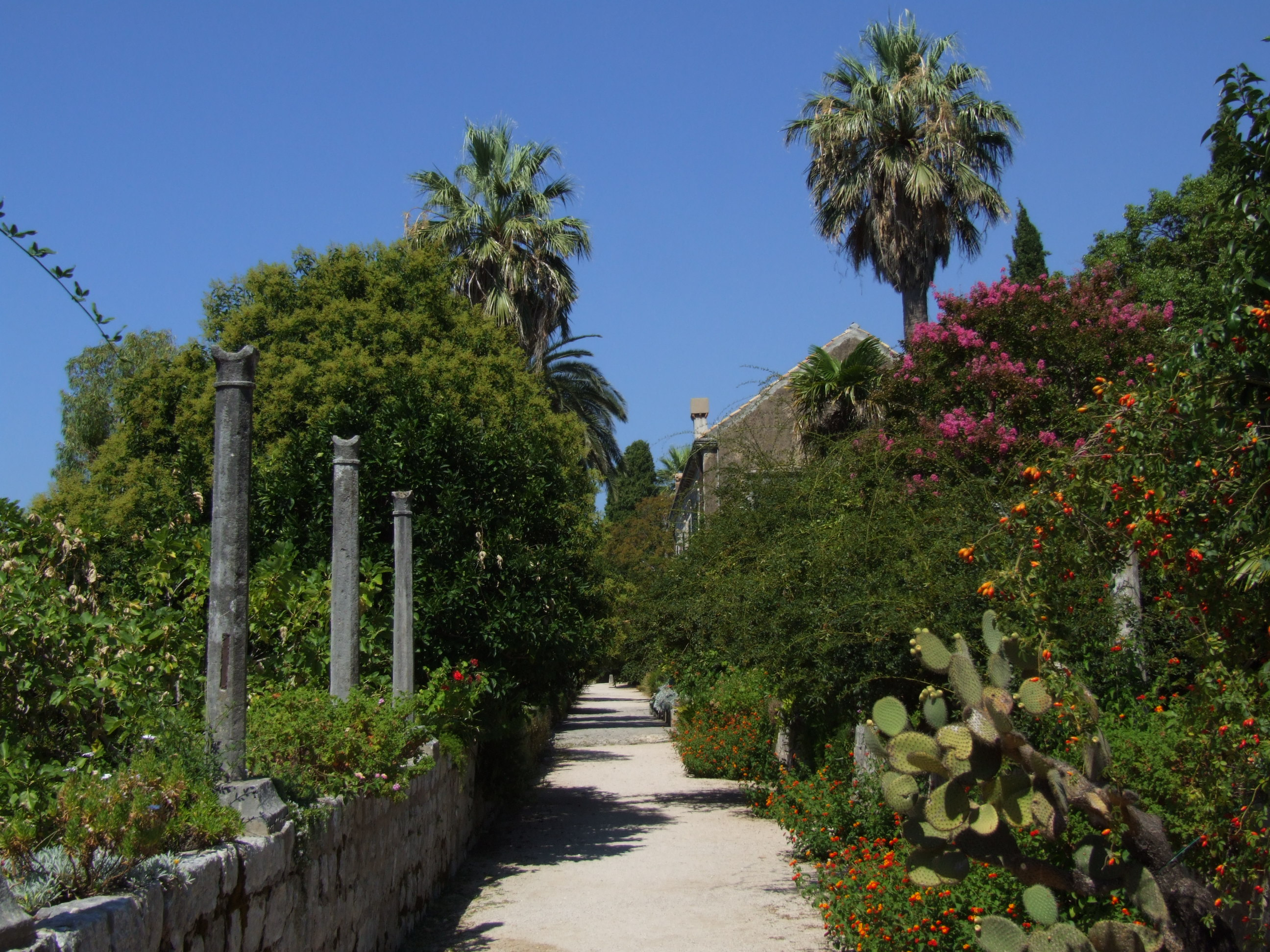
Arboretum Trsteno

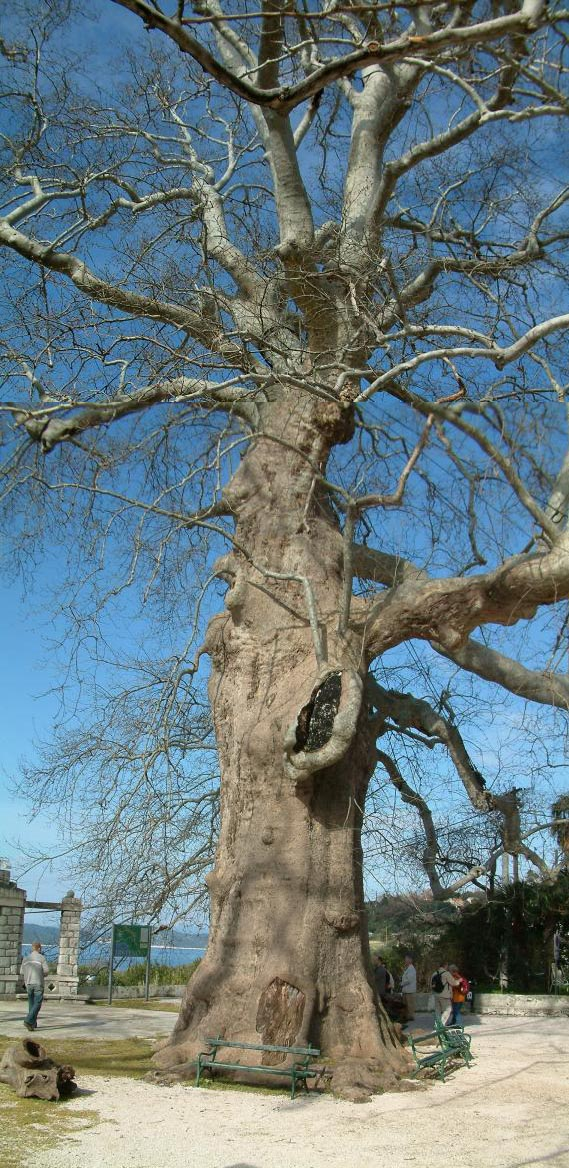
Old plane tree at the Arboretum entrance
