= Pietro Luccari =

Most Reverend Pietro Luccari
- Bishop of Ston
- Church: Catholic Church
- Diocese: Diocese of Ston
- In office: 1664–1679
- Predecessor: Carlo Giuliani (bishop)
- Successor: Giacinto Maria Passati

Personal details
- Died: 23 November 1679 Ston, Croatia

Pietro Luccari (died 23 November 1679) was a Roman Catholic prelate who served as Bishop of Ston (1664–1679).

== Biography ==
On 23 Jun 1664, Pietro Luccari was appointed by Pope Alexander VII as Bishop of Ston. He served as Bishop of Ston until his death on 23 Nov 1679.

Catholic Church titles
Preceded by Carlo Giuliani (bishop)	Bishop of Ston; 1664–1679	Succeeded by Giacinto Maria Passati
