= Carlo Giuliani (bishop) =

The Most Reverend Carlo Giuliani O.P.
- Bishop of Ston
- Church: Catholic Church
- Diocese: Diocese of Ston
- In office: 1653–1663
- Predecessor: Paolo de Gratiis
- Successor: Pietro Luccari

Orders
- Consecration: 9 February 1653 by Marcello Santacroce

Personal details
- Died: 3 November 1663 Ston, Croatia

Carlo Giuliani, O.P. (died 1663) was a Roman Catholic prelate who served as Bishop of Ston (1653–1663).

== Biography ==
Carlo Giuliani was ordained a priest in the Order of Preachers. On 3 February 1653, he was appointed during the papacy of Pope Innocent X as Bishop of Ston. On 9 February 1653, he was consecrated bishop by Marcello Santacroce, Bishop of Tivoli, with Giovanni Lucas Moncalvi, Bishop of Guardialfiera, and Riginaldo Lucarini, Bishop of Città della Pieve, serving as co-consecrators.

He served as Bishop of Stagno until his death on 3 November 1663.

Catholic Church titles
Preceded by Paolo de Gratiis	Bishop of Ston; 1653–1663	Succeeded by Pietro Luccari
