= Nicolò Niconisi =

Most Reverend Nicolò Niconisi
- Bishop of Ston
- Church: Catholic Church
- Diocese: Diocese of Ston
- In office: 1513–1541
- Predecessor: Tommaso Malombra
- Successor: Tommaso Cervino

Personal details
- Died: 1541 Ston, Croatia

Nicolò Niconisi (died 1541) was a Roman Catholic prelate who served as Bishop of Ston (1513–1541).

In 1513, Niconisi was appointed by Pope Leo X as Bishop of Ston. He served as Bishop of Ston until his death in 1541.

Catholic Church titles
Preceded by Tommaso Malombra	Bishop of Ston; 1513–1541	Succeeded by Tommaso Cervino
