= Alfonso Basilio Ghetaldo =

Ragusan bishop of Ston 1694–1702 (1647–1702)

Most Reverend Alfonso Basilio Ghetaldo
- Bishop of Stagno
- Church: Catholic Church
- Diocese: Roman Catholic Diocese of Stagno
- In office: 1647–1702
- Predecessor: Giaconto Tuartkovich
- Successor: Vincenzo Lupi

Orders
- Consecration: 25 July 1694 by Galeazzo Marescotti

Personal details
- Born: 1647 Ragusa
- Died: 12 September 1702 (age 55) Stagno, Croatia

Alfonso Basilio Ghetaldo, O.S.B. (1647–1702) was a Roman Catholic prelate who served as Bishop of Stagno (1694–1702).

== Biography ==
Alfonso Basilio Ghetaldo was born in Ragusa in 1647 and ordained a priest in the Order of Saint Benedict. On 19 July 1694, he was appointed during the papacy of Pope Innocent XII as Bishop of Stagno. On 25 July 1694, he was consecrated bishop by Galeazzo Marescotti, Cardinal-Priest of Santi Quirico e Giulitta, with Prospero Bottini, Titular Archbishop of Myra, and Stefano Giuseppe Menatti, Titular Bishop of Cyrene, with serving as co-consecrators. He served as Bishop of Stagno until his death on 12 September 1702.

Catholic Church titles
Preceded by Giaconto Tuartkovich	Bishop of Stagno; 1694–1702	Succeeded by Vincenzo Lupi
