= Pietro Gozze =

Most Reverend Pietro Gozze
- Bishop of Ston
- Church: Catholic Church
- Diocese: Diocese of Ston
- In office: 1551–1564
- Predecessor: Tommaso Cervino
- Successor: Boniface of Ragusa

Personal details
- Born: 1493 Dubrovnik, Croatia
- Died: 1564 (aged 70–71) Ston, Croatia

Pietro Gozze or Petar Gučetić (1493–1564), called Doctor Illyricus, was a Ragusan Catholic prelate who served as the bishop of Ston (1551–1564).

Gozze was born in Dubrovnik (Ragusa) in the republic of Ragusa in 1493. The term Illyricus indicates that he was a Croat. He was ordained a priest in the Order of Preachers. Before he became a bishop, he held professorships at the University of Paris and the University of Louvain. On 25 February 1551, he was appointed by Pope Julius III to the diocese of Ston. He served until his death in 1564.

Catholic Church titles
Preceded by Tommaso Cervino	Bishop of Ston; 1551–1564	Succeeded by Boniface of Ragusa
