= Brsečine =

- Village
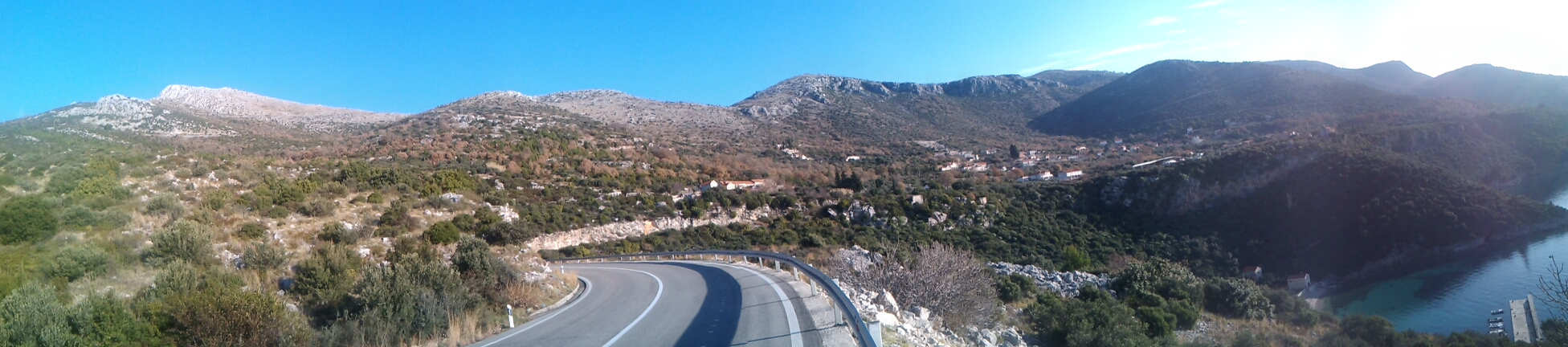
- Brsečine

- Location within Croatia
- Coordinates: 42°43′49″N 17°57′32″E
- Country: Croatia
- County: Dubrovnik-Neretva County
- Municipality: Dubrovnik

Area
  - Total: 1.2 sq mi (3.2 km^{2})

Population (2021)
  - Total: 84
  - Density: 68/sq mi (26/km^{2})
- Time zone: UTC+1 (CET)
  - Summer (DST): UTC+2 (CEST)
- Postal code: 20235 Zaton Veliki

Brsečine is a village in southern Croatia, administratively located in the City of Dubrovnik, about 1 km from the cove bearing the same name, and 25 km northwest of Dubrovnik. Brsečine is protected from cold, northerly winds by the limestone crests of Kondulo.

In the cove is the summer mansion of the Zuzorić family from the 16th century, and above the cove, the fortified mansion of the Ohmućević-Bizzaro family, with a chapel and a park, from the 17th century. The village also features the church of St. George and the ruins of a small church of St. Stephen located next to it.

== Demographics ==
According to the 2021 census, its population was 84. Population was 96 in 2011.

Its economy is based on farming and fishing.

== Notable people ==
- Vid Vuletić Vukasović
