= Diocese of Ston =

Roman Catholic diocese in Croatia (800 - 1828)

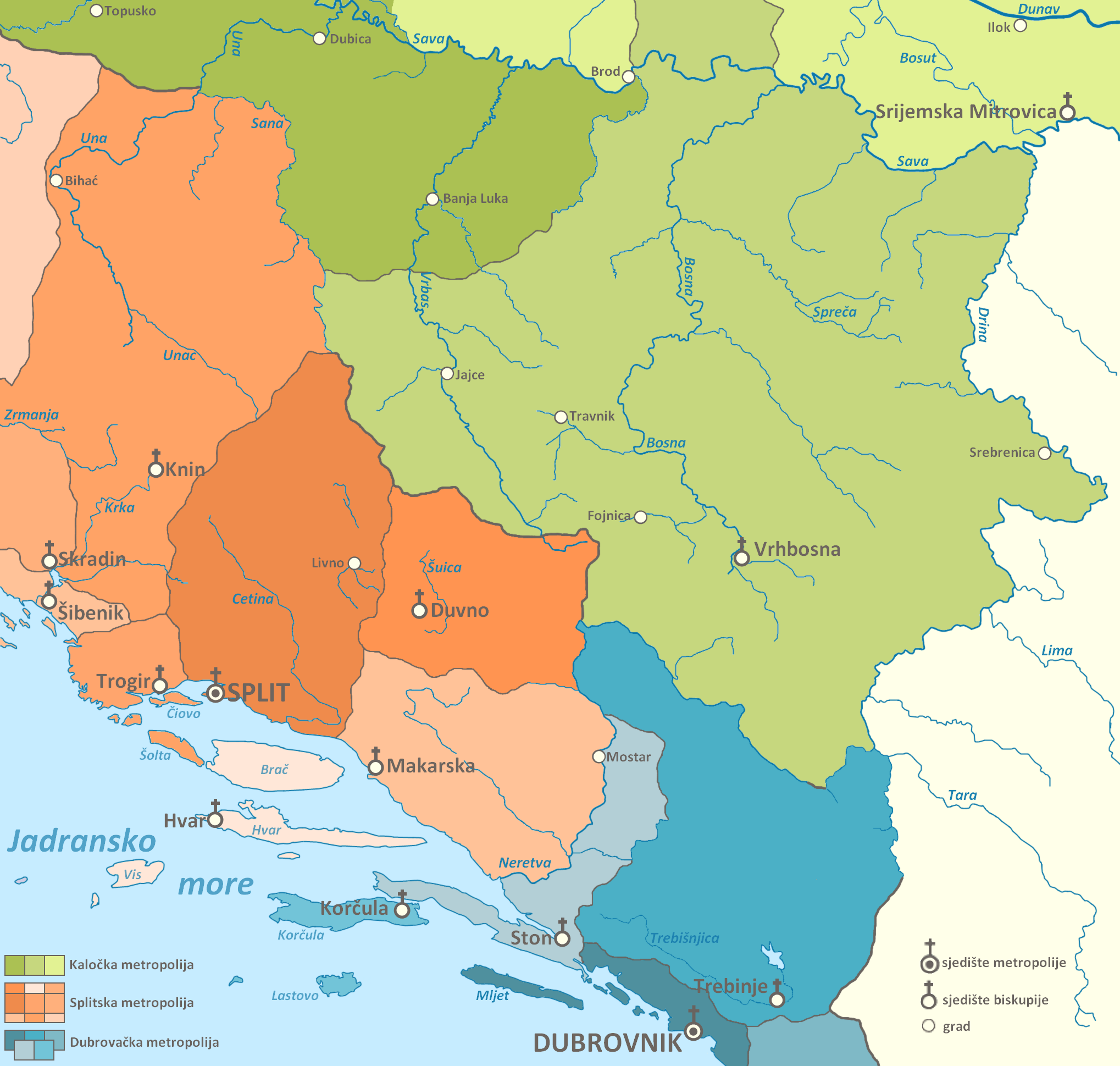
Catholic Dioceses in Bosnia and Dalmatia in the 15th century

The Diocese of Ston (also Diocese of Stagno or Diocese of Sagona) was a Roman Catholic diocese in Croatia, located in the city of Stagno. In 1828 it was suppressed to the Archdiocese of Dubrovnik.

== History ==
- 800: Established (from Diocese of Ragusa) as Diocese of Ston (Dioecesis Stagnensis)
- 1300: Suppressed (to establish Diocese of Korčula)
- 1541: Restored as Diocese of Ston (from Diocese of Korčula)
- June 30, 1828: Suppressed (to the Archdiocese of Dubrovnik) via the papal bull, Locum Beati Petri, issued by Pope Leo XII on 30 June 1828.
- 1933: Restored as Titular Episcopal See of Ston

== Ordinaries ==
=== Diocese of Ston ===
- Dominic Thopia, O.P. (1350–1368) Appointed, Archbishop of Zadar)
- Tommaso Malombra (7 Feb 1463 – 1513 Died)
- Nicolò Niconisi (1513 – 1541 Died)
- Tommaso Cervino, O.P. (2 Dec 1541 – 1551 Resigned)
- Pietro de Gozzo, O.P. (25 Feb 1551 – 1564 Died)
- Boniface of Ragusa, O.F.M. (17 Nov 1564 – 1582 Died)
- Basilio Gradi, O.S.B. (14 Mar 1584 – 1585 Died)
- Crisostomo Arameo, O.S.B. (18 Mar 1585 – 1605 Died)
- Giovanni Battista Giorgi, O.S.B. (14 Aug 1606 – 24 Nov 1608 Died)
- Michael Rezzi (Resti) (28 Sep 1609 – 9 Jul 1614 Appointed, Bishop of Nusco)
- Ambrogio Gozzeo, O.P. (23 Mar 1615 – 13 Jul 1632 Died)
- Ludovico Giamagna, O.P. (24 Nov 1632 – Jul 1634 Died)
- Paolo de Gratiis (9 Jul 1635 – 1652 Died)
- Carlo Giuliani (bishop), O.P. (3 Feb 1653 – 3 Nov 1663 Died)
- Pietro Luccari (23 Jun 1664 – 23 Nov 1679 Died)
- Giacinto Maria Passati, O.P. (13 May 1680 – 8 Aug 1680 Died)
- Agostino Flavio Macedonich, O.F.M. (27 Jan 1681 – 14 Dec 1682 Died)
- Giovanni Battista Natali (bishop), O.P. (15 Nov 1683 – 4 Aug 1687 Died)
- Carlo Olantes, O.P. (31 May 1688 – 10 Nov 1692 Died)
- Giaconto Tuartkovich, O.F.M. (13 Apr 1693 – Jan 1694 Died)
- Alfonso Basilio Ghetaldo, O.S.B. (19 Jul 1694 – 12 Sep 1702 Died)
- Vincenzo Lupi, O.F.M. (4 Jun 1703 – 3 Nov 1709 Died)
- Francesco Volanti (7 May 1710 – 8 Apr 1741 Died)
- Angelo Maria (Jean Luc) Volanti, O.P. (3 Jul 1741 – 25 Jun 1744 Died)
- Hijacint Marija Milković, O.P. (21 Jun 1745 – 20 Mar 1752 Appointed, Archbishop of Dubrovnik)
- Pietro Budmani (17 Jul 1752 – 2 Apr 1772 Died)
- Francesco Maria Sorgo Bobali, O.F.M. (7 Sep 1772 – 29 Jun 1800 Died)
- Antonio Raffaele Dolci, O.P. (20 Oct 1800 – 1807 Died)
