= Napoleone Comitoli =

Italian Roman Catholic bishop (1548–1624)

Most Reverend Napoleone Comitoli
- Bishop of Perugia
- Church: Catholic Church
- Diocese: Diocese of Perugia
- In office: 1591–1624
- Predecessor: Antonio Maria Gallo
- Successor: Cosimo de Torres

Orders
- Consecration: 11 Aug 1591 by Giulio Antonio Santorio

Personal details
- Born: 1548 Castelleone (Deruta), Italy
- Died: 30 August 1624 (aged 75–76) Perugia, Italy

Napoleone Comitoli (1548 – 30 August 1624) was a Roman Catholic prelate who served as Bishop of Perugia (1591–1624).

== Biography ==
Napoleone Comitoli was born in Castelleone (Deruta), Italy in 1548. On 19 Jul 1591, he was appointed during the papacy of Pope Gregory XIV as Bishop of Perugia. On 11 Aug 1591, he was consecrated bishop by Giulio Antonio Santorio, Cardinal-Priest of San Bartolomeo all'Isola, with Ludovico de Torres, Archbishop of Monreale, Flaminio Filonardi, Bishop of Aquino, and Leonard Abel, Titular Bishop of Sidon, serving as co-consecrators. He served as Bishop of Perugia until his death on 30 Aug 1624.

While bishop, he was the principal co-consecrator of Fabio Aresti, Bishop of Lucera (1601); Innocenzo Del Bufalo-Cancellieri, Bishop of Camerino (1601); and Virgilio Fiorenzi, Bishop of Nocera Umbra (1605).

== See also ==
- Catholic Church in Italy

== External links and additional sources ==
- Cheney, David M. "Archdiocese of Perugia-Città della Pieve". Catholic-Hierarchy.org. (for Chronology of Bishops) ^{[self-published]}
- Chow, Gabriel. "Metropolitan Archdiocese of Perugia-Città della Pieve (Italy)". GCatholic.org. (for Chronology of Bishops) ^{[self-published]}

Catholic Church titles
Preceded by Antonio Maria Gallo	Bishop of Perugia; 1591–1624	Succeeded by Cosimo de Torres
