= Diocese of Assisi-Nocera Umbra-Gualdo Tadino =

Roman Catholic diocese in Italy

Coordinates: 43.0700°N 12.6175°E

Diocese of Assisi-Nocera Umbra-Gualdo Tadino Dioecesis Assisiensis-Nucerina-Tadinensis

Catholic
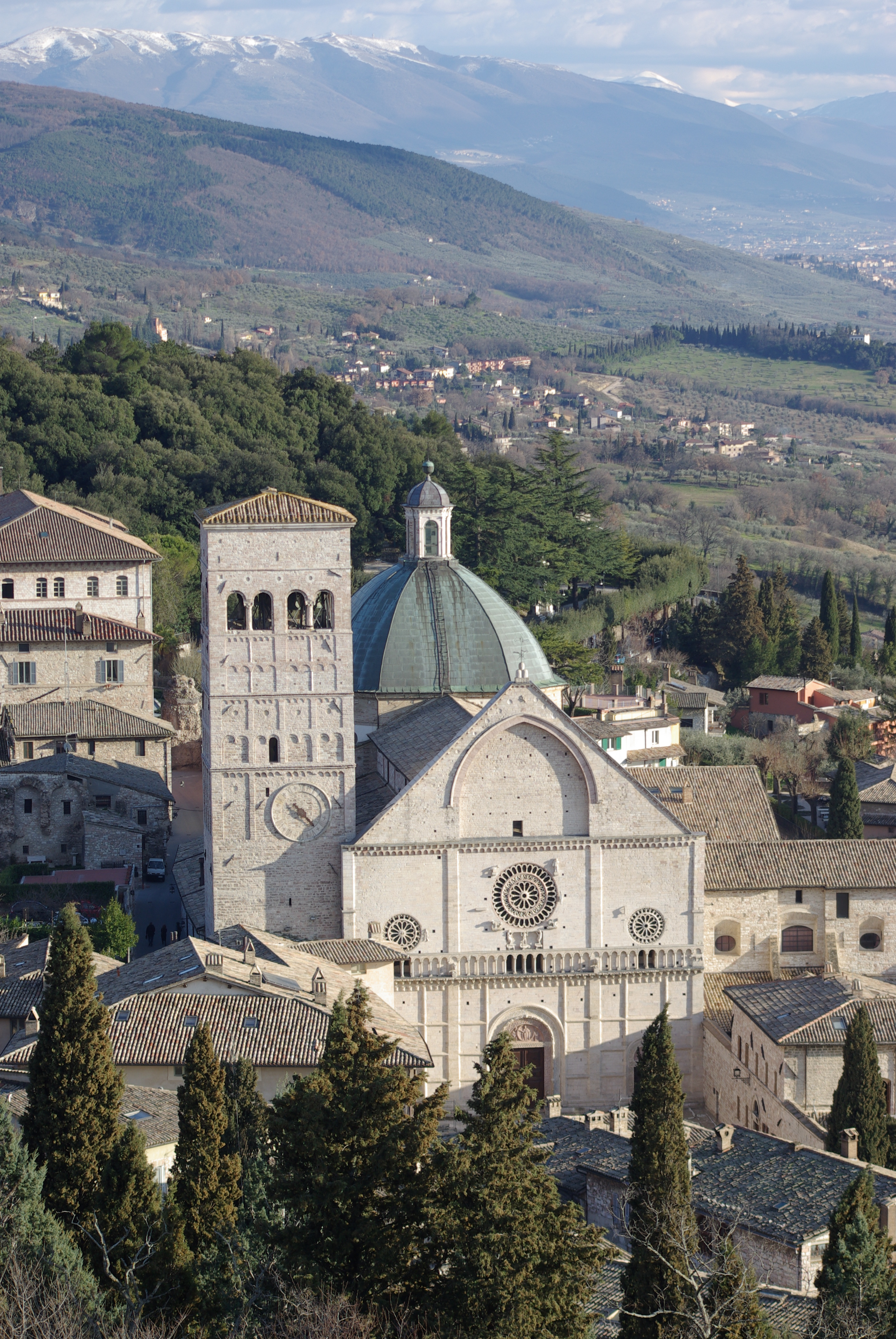
- Assisi Cathedral

Location
- Country: Italy
- Ecclesiastical province: Perugia-Città della Pieve

Statistics
- Area: 1,142 km^{2} (441 sq mi)
- Population: Total; Catholics: (as of 2006); 84,850; 81,000 (95.5%)
- Parishes: 63

Information
- Denomination: Catholic Church
- Rite: Roman Rite
- Established: 3rd century
- Cathedral: Cattedrale di S. Rufino (Assisi)
- Co-cathedral: Concattedrale di S. Maria Assunta (Nocera Umbra); Basilica Concattedrale di S. Benedetto (Gualdo Tadino)

Current leadership
- Pope: Leo XIV
- Bishop: Felice Accrocca
- Metropolitan Archbishop: Ivan Maffeis
- Bishops emeritus: Domenico Sorrentino

Website
- www.chiesainumbria.it

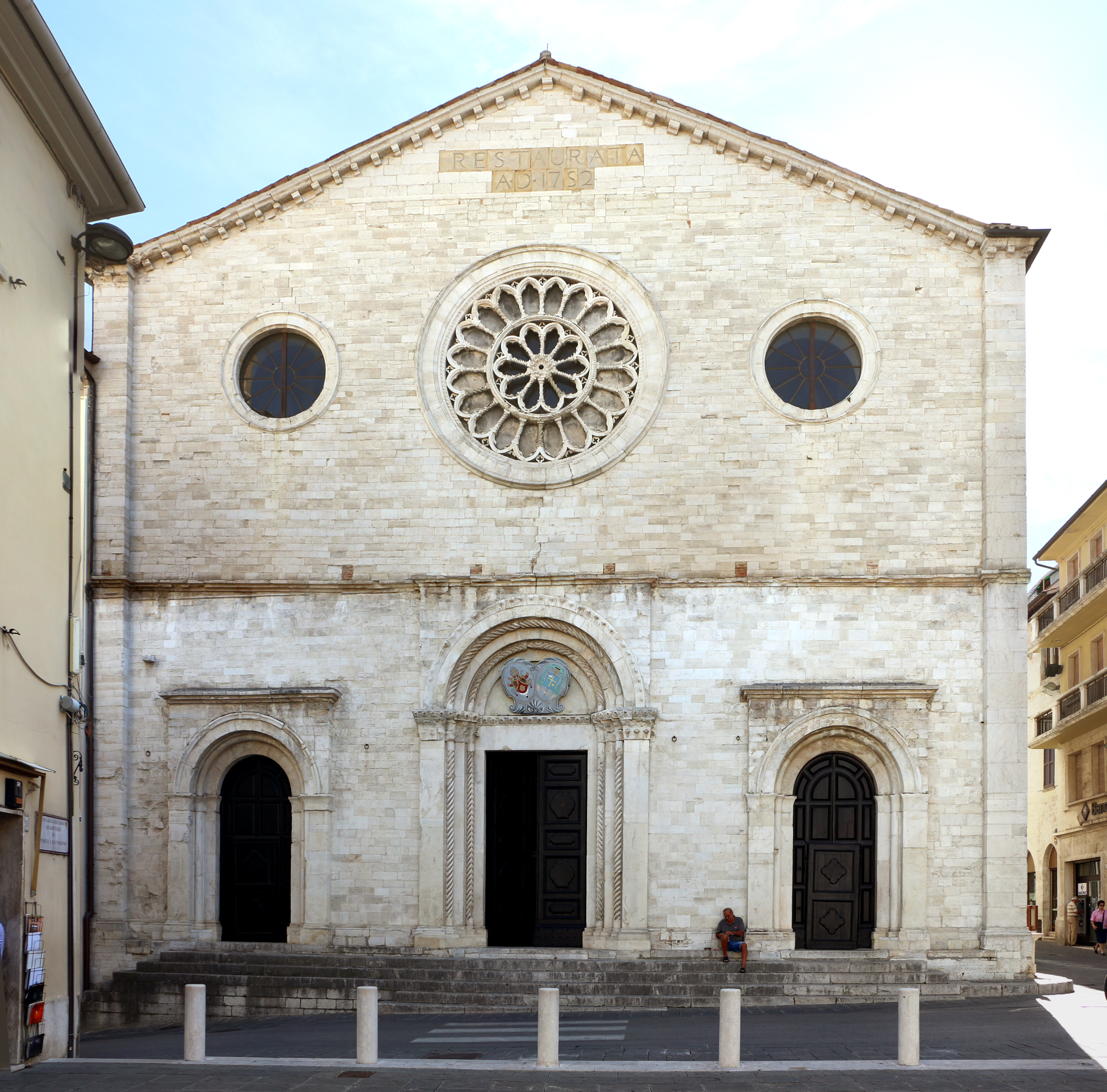
Co-cathedral in Gualdo Tadino

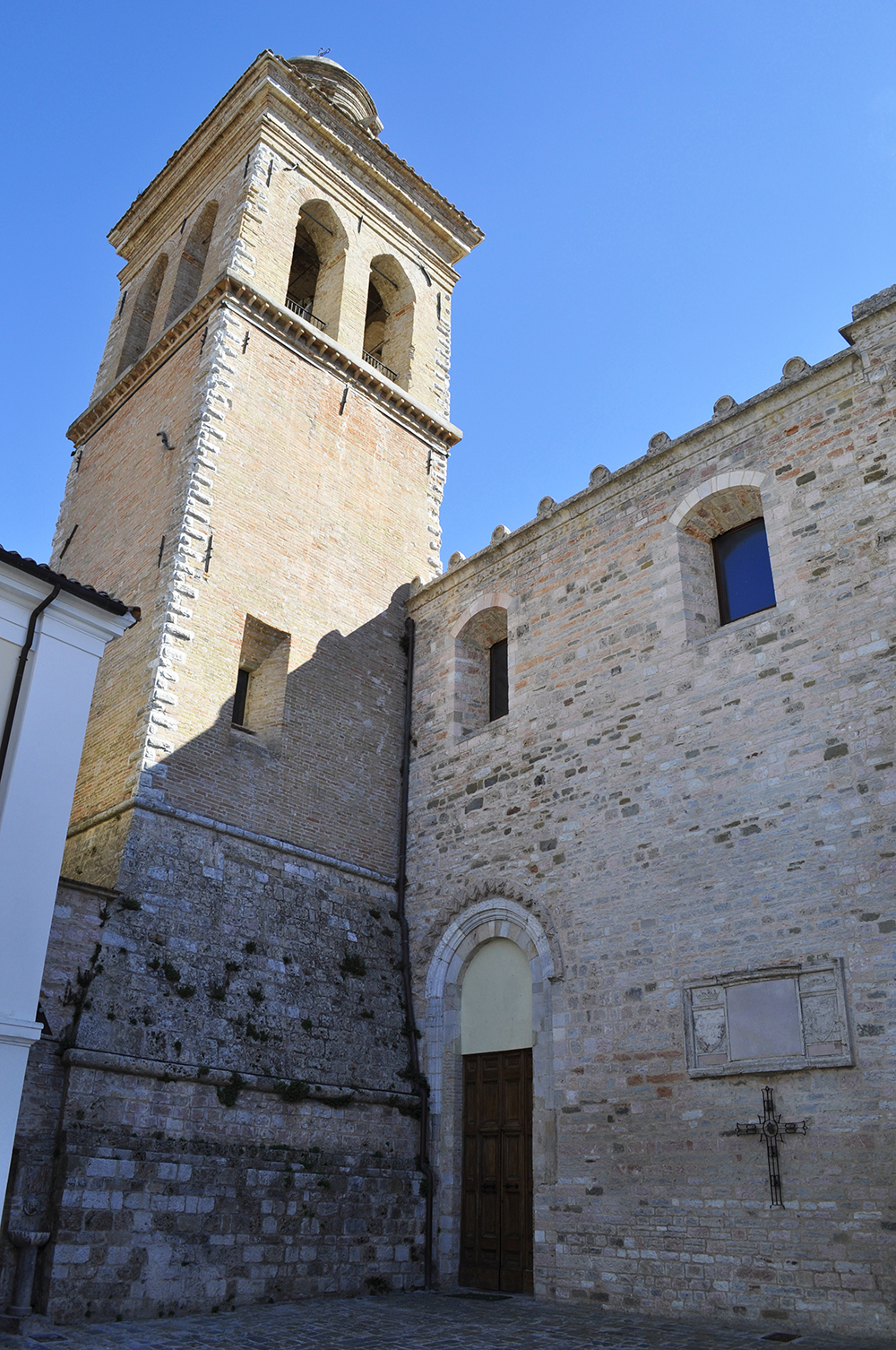
Co-cathedral in Nocera Umbra

The Diocese of Assisi-Nocera Umbra-Gualdo Tadino (Latin: Dioecesis Assisiensis-Nucerina-Tadinensis) is a Latin diocese of the Catholic Church in Umbria, has existed since 1986. In that year the historic Diocese of Assisi, known as the birthplace of Francis of Assisi, was combined with the Diocese of Nocera Umbra-Gualdo Tadino. The diocese is a suffragan of the Archdiocese of Perugia-Città della Pieve.

== History ==
The Gospel was first preached to the people of Assisi about the middle of the third century by St. Cyspolitus, Bishop of Bettona (ancient Vettona), who suffered martyrdom under the Emperor Maximian. About 235 St. Rufinus was appointed Bishop of Assisi by Pope Fabian; he suffered martyrdom about 236; and was succeeded by St. Victorinus. Both St. Victorinus and his immediate successor, St. Sabinus, died martyrs.

Of the bishops who occupied the See of Assisi during the fifth and sixth centuries, Aventius interceded (545) with Totila in behalf of the Assisians, and saved the city from the Ostrogothic army on its way to Rome. In succeeding centuries mention is made of several Bishops of Assisi who were present at general councils of the Church. Thus, in 659, Aquilinus was summoned by Pope Martin I to be present at the Lateran Council, convened for the purpose of formulating decrees against the Monothelites.

In the seventh and eighth centuries Assisi fell under the power of the Lombard dukes, and in 773 was razed to the ground by Charlemagne for its determined resistance to him. He restored it, however, and at the same time all traces of Arian belief and Lombard sympathies disappeared. About the same time the great castle, or Rocca d'Assisi, was built, which stronghold made the town thenceforth a great power in the political life of central Italy.

Bishop Hugo, whose episcopate lasted from 1036 to 1050, transferred the episcopal chair to the cathedral of San Rufino, which he himself raised over the little oratory beneath which the Saint's bones had rested for eight centuries. From Sts. Rufinus to Ambrose Luddi, O. P., the bishops numbered some ninety-two; but of these some are little known, and the existence of others is more or less problematical.

In 1915, the Diocese of Nocera Umbra was united with the Diocese of Gualdo Tadino to form the Diocese of Nocera Umbra-Gualdo Tadino, which was eventually united with the Diocese of Assisi in 1986 to become the Diocese of Assisi-Nocera Umbra-Gualdo Tadino.

== Ordinaries ==
=== Bishops of Assisi ===
Erected: 3rd Century
Latin Name: Assisiensis
Immediately Subject to the Holy See

- Illuminato da Chieti, O.F.M. (1274 – 1280/2)

...

- Ludovico Francesco, O.F.M. (29 Nov 1378 – )

...

- Francesco Oddi de Tuderto (4 Nov 1444 – 1456 Died)

...

- Francesco Insegna, O.F.M. (10 Aug 1483 – 10 December 1495 Died)
- Geremia Contugi (8 Feb 1496 – 1509 Resigned)
- Zaccaria Contugi (16 Dec 1509 – 15 January 1526 Died)
- Silvio Passerini (19 Jan 1526 – 20 April 1529 Died)
- Angelo Marzi (10 Nov 1529 – 1541 Resigned)
- Angelo Archilegi (4 Feb 1541 – 2 May 1543 Died)
- Luigi Magnasco di Santa Fiora (6 Jul 1543 – 1552 Died)
- Tiberio Muti (9 Mar 1552 – 1554 Resigned)
- Galeazzo Roscio (8 Oct 1554 – 16 October 1563 Died)
- Filippo Geri (1 Mar 1564 – 1575 Died)
- Antonio Lorenzini (bishop) (2 Dec 1575 – 1577 Died)
- Giovanni Battista Brugnatelli (21 Jun 1577 – 1591 Died)
- Marcello Crescenzi (bishop) (13 Nov 1591 – 13 August 1630 Died)
- Tegrimus Tegrimi (23 Sep 1630 – Mar 1641 Died)
- Malatesta Baglioni (bishop) (16 Sep 1641 – 11 February 1648 Died)
- Paolo Emilio Rondinini (5 May 1653 – 16 September 1668 Died)
- Ludovicus Giustiniani, O.S.M. (1 Sep 1670 – 20 June 1685 Died)
- Francesco Nerli (iuniore) (1 Oct 1685 – 12 November 1689 Resigned)
- Carolus Salvatori (28 Nov 1689 – 13 April 1692 Died)
- Giovanni Vincenzo Lucchesini, O.S.M. (13 Apr 1693 – 12 April 1698 Died)
- Octavius Spader, O.F.M. (19 Dec 1698 – 24 March 1715 Died)
- Rogerius Giacobetti (29 May 1715 – 3 May 1716 Died)
- Simone Marco Palmerini (1 Jul 1716 – 2 October 1731 Died)
- Giovanni Battista Rondoni (31 Mar 1732 – 12 September 1735 Died)
- Ottavio Ringhieri (11 Apr 1736 – 8 January 1755 Died)
- Niccola Sermattei (17 Mar 1755 – 11 March 1780 Died)
- Carlo Zangari (18 Sep 1780 – 31 March 1796 Died)
- Francesco Maria Giampè (27 Jun 1796 – 8 March 1827 Died)
- Gregorio Zelli, O.S.B. (21 Mar 1827 – 2 July 1832 Appointed, Bishop of Ascoli Piceno)
- Dominico Secondi, O.F.M. Conv. (2 Jul 1832 – 5 June 1841 Resigned)
- Carlo Giuseppe Peda, B. (12 Jul 1841 – 21 July 1843 Died)
- Luigi Landi-Vittori (22 Jan 1844 – 25 August 1867 Died)
- Paolo dei Conti Fabiani (23 Feb 1872 – 17 May 1880 Died)
- Peregrini Tofoni (20 Aug 1880 – 31 January 1883 Died)
- Gaetano Lironi (15 Mar 1883 – 30 May 1889 Died)
- Nicanor Priori (30 Dec 1889 – 15 December 1895 Died)
- Luigi de Persiis (22 Jun 1896 – 31 October 1904 Died)
- Ambrogio Onorato Luddi, O.P. (27 Feb 1905 – 22 December 1927 Retired)
- Giuseppe Placido Nicolini, O.S.B. (22 Jun 1928 – 25 November 1973 Died)
- Dino Tomassini (12 Dec 1974 – 30 July 1980 Died)
- Sergio Goretti (14 Dec 1980 – 19 November 2005 Retired)

=== Bishops of Assisi-Nocera Umbra-Gualdo Tadino ===
United: 30 September 1986 with the Diocese of Nocera Umbra-Gualdo Tadino
Latin Name: Assisiensis-Nucerinus-Tadinensis
Metropolitan: Archdiocese of Perugia-Città della Pieve

- Domenico Sorrentino (19 Nov 2005 – 10 Jan 2026 Retired) Archbishop ad personam
- Felice Accrocca (10 Jan 2026 – present) Archbishop ad personam
