= Virgilio Fiorenzi =

17th-century Catholic bishop

Most Reverend Virgilio Fiorenzi
- Bishop of Nocera Umbra
- Church: Catholic Church
- Diocese: Diocese of Nocera Umbra
- In office: 1605–1644
- Predecessor: Roberto Pierbenedetti
- Successor: Orazio Giustiniani

Orders
- Consecration: 3 Jul 1605 by Innocenzo Del Bufalo-Cancellieri

Personal details
- Born: 1560 Perugia, Italy
- Died: 9 Dec 1644 (age 89)

Virgilio Fiorenzi or Virgilio Fiorentini (1560–1644) was a Roman Catholic prelate who served as Bishop of Nocera Umbra (1605–1644).

== Biography ==
Virgilio Fiorenzi was born in Perugia, Italy in 1560. On 27 Jun 1605, he was appointed during the papacy of Pope Paul V as Bishop of Nocera Umbra. On 3 Jul 1605, he was consecrated bishop by Innocenzo Del Bufalo-Cancellieri, Bishop of Camerino, with Napoleone Comitoli, Bishop of Perugia, and Flaminio Filonardi, Bishop of Aquino, serving as co-consecrators. He served as Bishop of Nocera Umbra until his death on 9 Dec 1644.

== Episcopal succession ==
While bishop, he was the principal co-consecrator of:

- Domenico de' Marini, Bishop of Albenga (1611);
- Angelo Gozzadini, Archbishop of Naxos (1616);
- Giovanni Battista Colonna, Titular Patriarch of Jerusalem (1636).

== External links and additional sources ==
- Cheney, David M. "Diocese of Nocera Umbra-Gualdo Tadino". Catholic-Hierarchy.org. (for Chronology of Bishops)
- Chow, Gabriel. "Diocese of Nocera Umbra-Gualdo Tadino (Italy)". GCatholic.org. (for Chronology of Bishops)

Catholic Church titles
Preceded by Roberto Pierbenedetti	Bishop of Nocera Umbra; 1605–1644	Succeeded by Orazio Giustiniani
