= Innocenzo Del Bufalo-Cancellieri =

His Eminence Innocenzo Del Bufalo-Cancellieri
- Cardinal-Priest of Santi Nereo ed Achilleo
- Church: Catholic Church

Orders
- Consecration: 20 May 1601 by Mariano Pierbenedetti

Personal details
- Born: 1566 Rome, Italy
- Died: 27 Mar 1610 (age 44) Rome, Italy

Innocenzo Del Bufalo-Cancellieri (1566–1610) was a Roman Catholic cardinal.

== Biography ==
On 20 May 1601, he was consecrated bishop by Mariano Pierbenedetti, Cardinal-Priest of Santi Marcellino e Pietro, with Napoleone Comitoli, Bishop of Perugia, and Tommaso Vannini, Bishop of Avellino e Frigento, serving as co-consecrators.

While bishop, he was the principal consecrator of Virgilio Fiorenzi, Bishop of Nocera Umbra (1605).

Catholic Church titles
Preceded by Gentile Dolfino	Bishop of Camerino; 1601–1606	Succeeded by Giovanni Severini (archbishop)
Preceded by Gaspare Silingardi	Apostolic Nuncio to France; 1601–1604	Succeeded by Maffeo Barberini
Preceded by Francesco Mantica	Cardinal-Priest of San Tommaso in Parione; 1604–1605	Succeeded by Carlo Gaudenzio Madruzzo
Preceded by Paolo Emilio Zacchia	Cardinal-Priest of San Marcello; 1605–1606	Succeeded by François d'Escoubleau de Sourdis
Preceded by Ascanio Colonna	Cardinal-Priest of Santa Pudenziana; 1606–1607	Succeeded by Bonifazio Caetani
Preceded by Cesare Baronio	Cardinal-Priest of Santi Nereo ed Achilleo; 1607–1610	Succeeded by Pier Paolo Crescenzi
