= Malatesta Baglioni =

Malatesta Baglioni may refer to:

- Malatesta I Baglioni (1390–1437), Italian condottiero
- Malatesta IV Baglioni (1491–1531), Italian condottiero and lord
- Malatesta Baglioni (bishop) (1581–1648), Italian Roman Catholic bishop
