= Cathedral of Nocera Umbra =

Nocera Umbra Cathedral
- Duomo di Nocera Umbra
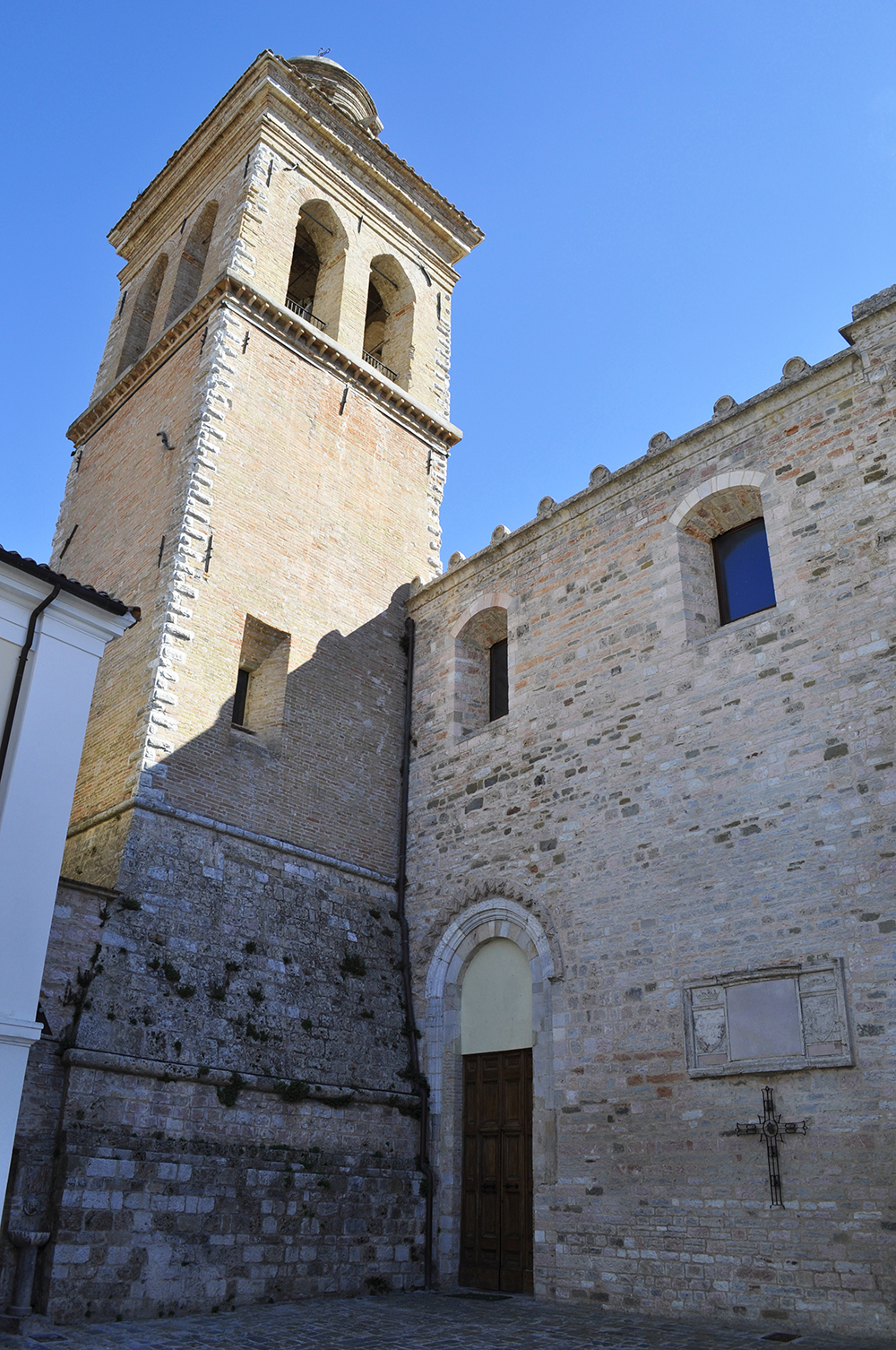
- Exterior of the Cathedral and the bell tower
- Nocera Umbra Cathedral
- 43°06′36″N 12°47′27″E
- Location: Nocera Umbra, Province of Perugia, Umbria, Italy
- Denomination: Roman Catholic

History
- Status: co-cathedral

Architecture
- Previous cathedrals: Sancta Maria Vetus
- Architectural type: Church
- Style: Romanesque, Italian Baroque
- Groundbreaking: 1448
- Completed: 1925

Administration
- Archdiocese: Metropolitan Archdiocese of Perugia–Città della Pieve
- Diocese: Diocese of Assisi-Nocera Umbra-Gualdo Tadino

The church of Saint Maria Assunta is a Catholic parish church in Nocera Umbra, in Umbria, and co-cathedral of the diocese of Assisi-Nocera Umbra-Gualdo Tadino.

== History ==
The cathedral (Ecclesia Maior) of Nocera probably rests on the foundations of a temple dedicated to the goddess Favonia, who gave the name to one of the two tribes of the founders of Nocera (Umbrian:Noukria, "the New"), the Favonienses. The church existed for sure before the year thousand, and was the most ancient church of the territory. The most probable location is the top of the hill where medieval Nocera rose. During the middle ages the town was a best equipped fortress ("fortissima arx nucerina") ramparted by the Lombards in defense of the Duchy of Spoleto against the Byzantines who controlled Gualdo Tadino and Gubbio. The dedicatio is surely that one of Maria Assunta, festivity that in the west reached its apogee in the centuries VIII-IX. Historical documents attest the existence of a Romanesque cathedral already in the XI-XII century. In the XI century the church was the family chapel of the comital family. The shrine – named Sancta Maria infra Arcem ("St. Mary in the fortress") – lay inside the city fortress, destroyed by Emperor Frederick II in the struggle between Guelphs and Ghibellines in 1248. Abandoned in ruins, in this period the church then called Sancta Maria vetus, placed where today is the church of S. Giovanni of the monastery of the Poor Clares, assumed the function of cathedral. Only in the mid-fifteenth century was undertaken the reconstruction of the old cathedral: the work began in 1448, exactly two hundred years after its devastation. In July 1487 were buried in the church the relics of St. Raynald, patron saint of the city, whose remains rest today under the high altar. The bell tower was finished in 1544. Further interventions were carried out in the 18th century with the transformation of the cathedral in Baroque style, and in the 19th century. The facade was completed in 1925.

The church was the cathedral of the Diocese of Nocera Umbra–Gualdo Tadino until its fusion with the Diocese of Assisi in 1986. It became the co-cathedral of the newly formed Diocese of Assisi-Nocera Umbra-Gualdo Tadino.

== Architecture and Decoration ==
=== Exterior ===
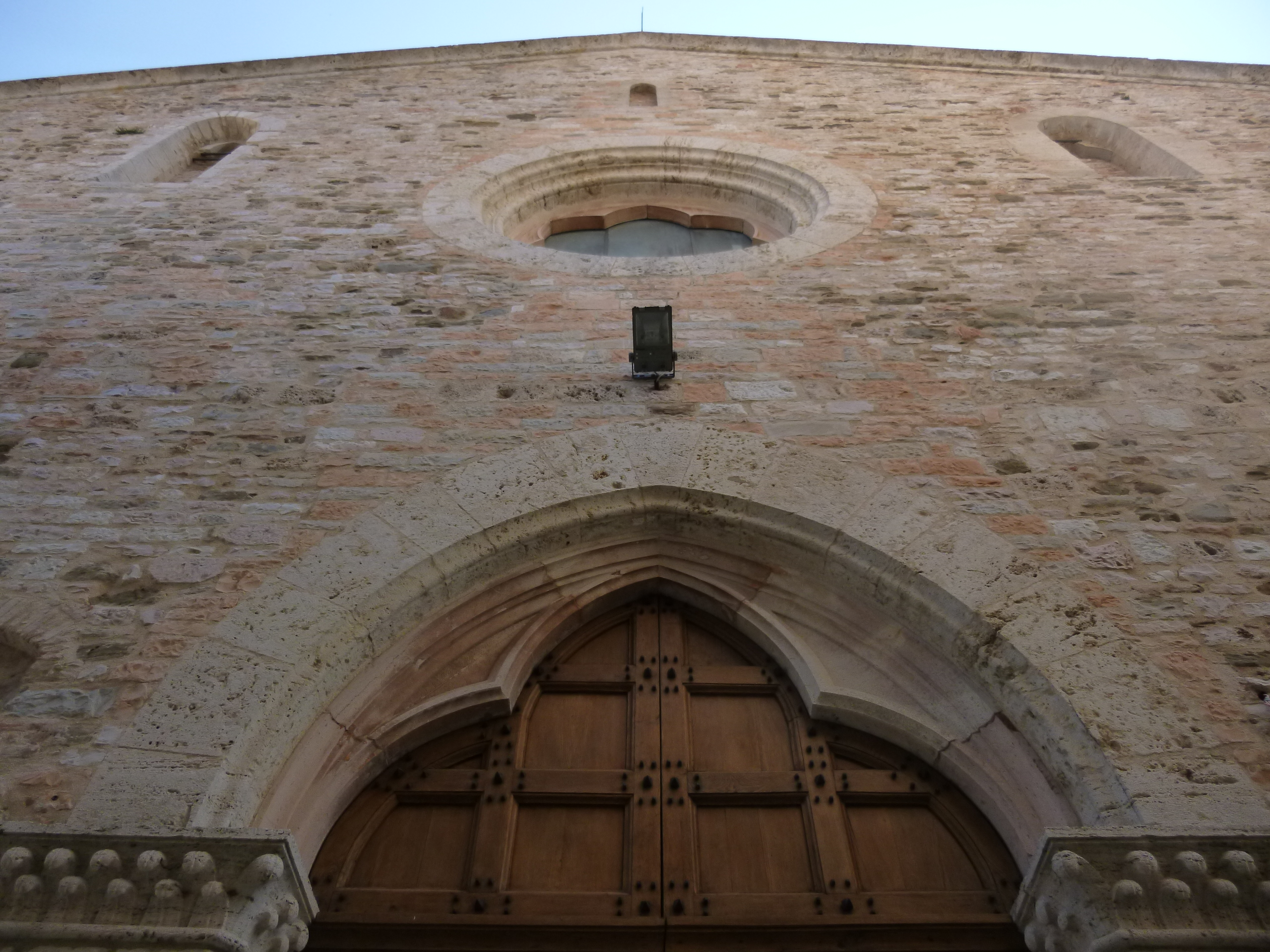
Partial view of the facade

Of the 11th century construction remains the Romanesque portal decorated with vine sheets and animals on the left side of the building. The facade, which is rather incongruously choked by the Campanaccio, the tower which is the only remain of the Trinci's castle, has stone decorations and a central Oculus. The bell tower has a little rear dome.

=== Interior ===
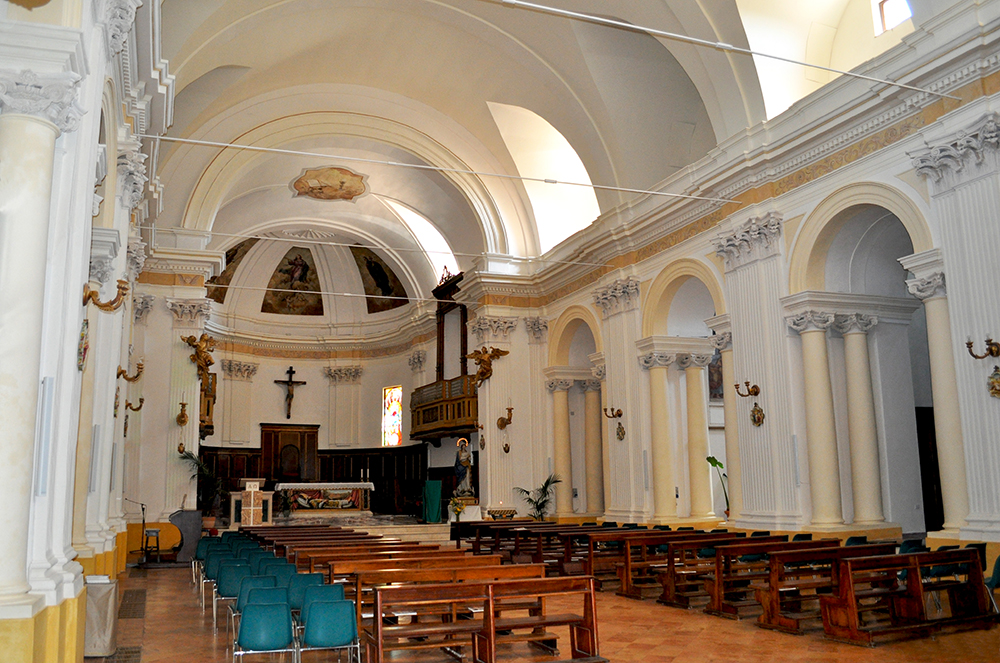
View of the interior.

Internally, the building has a single large nave with side chapels and a semicircular apse, and is richly decorated with stuccoes. In the fourth chapel to the left there is a cycle of Marian iconography frescoes (Presentation of the Virgin to the temple, Annunciation, Assumption with Charles Borromeo and Saint Anne, Saints) commissioned in 1619 by the comune of Nocera to Giulio Cesare Angeli. In the third chapel to the left there are many reliquaries and a fresco of 1514. The decoration of the apse is due to Elpidio Petrignani. Many works once in the church have been moved to in municipal Pinacotheca in the church of San Francesco: among them, the altarpiece Adoration of the Child with angels, Saints, Coronation of Virgin Mary, Apostles painted in 1483 from Niccolò di Liberatore detto l'Alunno, and the Meeting of Saint Anne and Joachim at the Porta Aurea, Immaculate Conception, Saints painted between the centuries XV and XVI from Matteo di Pietro da Gualdo, which was previously placed in the chapel of the Immaculate.

In the sacristy are noteworthy the majolica floor and paintings of 17th century: among them, Jesus Child sleeping and John the Baptist Child by Anonymous Roman sec. XVII; John the Baptist Child by anonymous Umbrian sec. XVII; and a cross painted by an anonymous Umbrian of the XIII century, previously kept in the Church of S. Martino.

== Sources ==
- Sigismondi, Gino (1979). Nuceria in Umbria (in Italian). Foligno: Ediclio.
- AA.VV. (2004). Umbria. Guida d'Italia (in Italian). Milano: Touring Club Italiano.
