= Giacomo Minutoli =

Roman Catholic prelate (died 1485)

Most Reverend Giacomo Minutoli
- Bishop of Agde
- Church: Catholic Church
- Diocese: Diocese of Agde
- In office: 1476–1485
- Successor: Niccolò Fieschi
- Previous post: Bishop of Nocera Umbra (1472–1476)

Personal details
- Died: 1485

Giacomo Minutoli or Jacques Minutoli (died 1485) was a Roman Catholic prelate who served as Bishop of Agde (1476–1485) and Bishop of Nocera Umbra (1472–1476).

== Biography ==
On 12 Oct 1472, Giacomo Minutoli was appointed during the papacy of Pope Sixtus IV as Bishop of Nocera Umbra. On 17 Aug 1476, he was appointed during the papacy of Pope Sixtus IV as Bishop of Agde. He served as Bishop of Agde until his death in 1485.

== External links and additional sources ==
- Cheney, David M. "Diocese of Nocera Umbra-Gualdo Tadino". Catholic-Hierarchy.org. (for Chronology of Bishops) ^{[self-published]}
- Chow, Gabriel. "Diocese of Nocera Umbra-Gualdo Tadino (Italy)". GCatholic.org. (for Chronology of Bishops) ^{[self-published]}

Catholic Church titles
Preceded by	Bishop of Nocera Umbra; 1472–1476	Succeeded by Giovanni Cerretani
Preceded by	Bishop of Agde; 1476–1485	Succeeded by Niccolò Fieschi
