= Giovanni Cerretani =

Italian Roman Catholic bishop (died 1492)

Most Reverend Giovanni Cerretani
- Bishop of Nocera Umbra
- Church: Catholic Church
- Diocese: Diocese of Nocera
- In office: 1476–1492
- Predecessor: Giacomo Minutoli
- Successor: Giacomo Breuquet

Personal details
- Died: July 1492

Giovanni Cerretani (died 1492) was a Roman Catholic prelate who served as Bishop of Nocera Umbra (1476–1492).

On 17 August 1476, Giovanni Cerretani was appointed during the papacy of Pope Sixtus IV as Bishop of Nocera Umbra. He served as Bishop of Nocera Umbra until his death in July 1492.

== External links and additional sources ==
- Cheney, David M. "Diocese of Nocera Umbra-Gualdo Tadino". Catholic-Hierarchy.org. (for Chronology of Bishops) ^{[self-published]}
- Chow, Gabriel. "Diocese of Nocera Umbra-Gualdo Tadino (Italy)". GCatholic.org. (for Chronology of Bishops) ^{[self-published]}

Catholic Church titles
Preceded by Giacomo Minutoli	Bishop of Nocera Umbra; 1476–1492	Succeeded by Giacomo Breuquet
