= Giacomo Breuquet =

Roman Catholic bishop

Most Reverend Giacomo Breuquet
- Bishop of Nocera Umbra
- Church: Catholic Church
- Diocese: Diocese of Nocera
- In office: 1492–1498
- Predecessor: Giovanni Cerretani
- Successor: Matteo Baldeschi

Personal details
- Died: 25 May 1498

Giacomo Breuquet (died 1498) was a Roman Catholic prelate who served as Bishop of Nocera Umbra (1492–1498).

On 31 August 1492, Giacomo Breuquet was appointed during the papacy of Pope Alexander VI as Bishop of Nocera Umbra. He served as Bishop of Nocera Umbra until his death on 25 May 1498.

== External links and additional sources ==
- Cheney, David M. "Diocese of Nocera Umbra-Gualdo Tadino". Catholic-Hierarchy.org. (for Chronology of Bishops) ^{[self-published]}
- Chow, Gabriel. "Diocese of Nocera Umbra-Gualdo Tadino (Italy)". GCatholic.org. (for Chronology of Bishops) ^{[self-published]}

Catholic Church titles
Preceded by Giovanni Cerretani	Bishop of Nocera Umbra; 1492–1498	Succeeded by Matteo Baldeschi
