= Paolo Emilio Rondinini =

Italian Catholic Cardinal

His Eminence Paolo Emilio Rondinini
- Bishop of Assisi, Cardinal priest of Sant'Eusebio
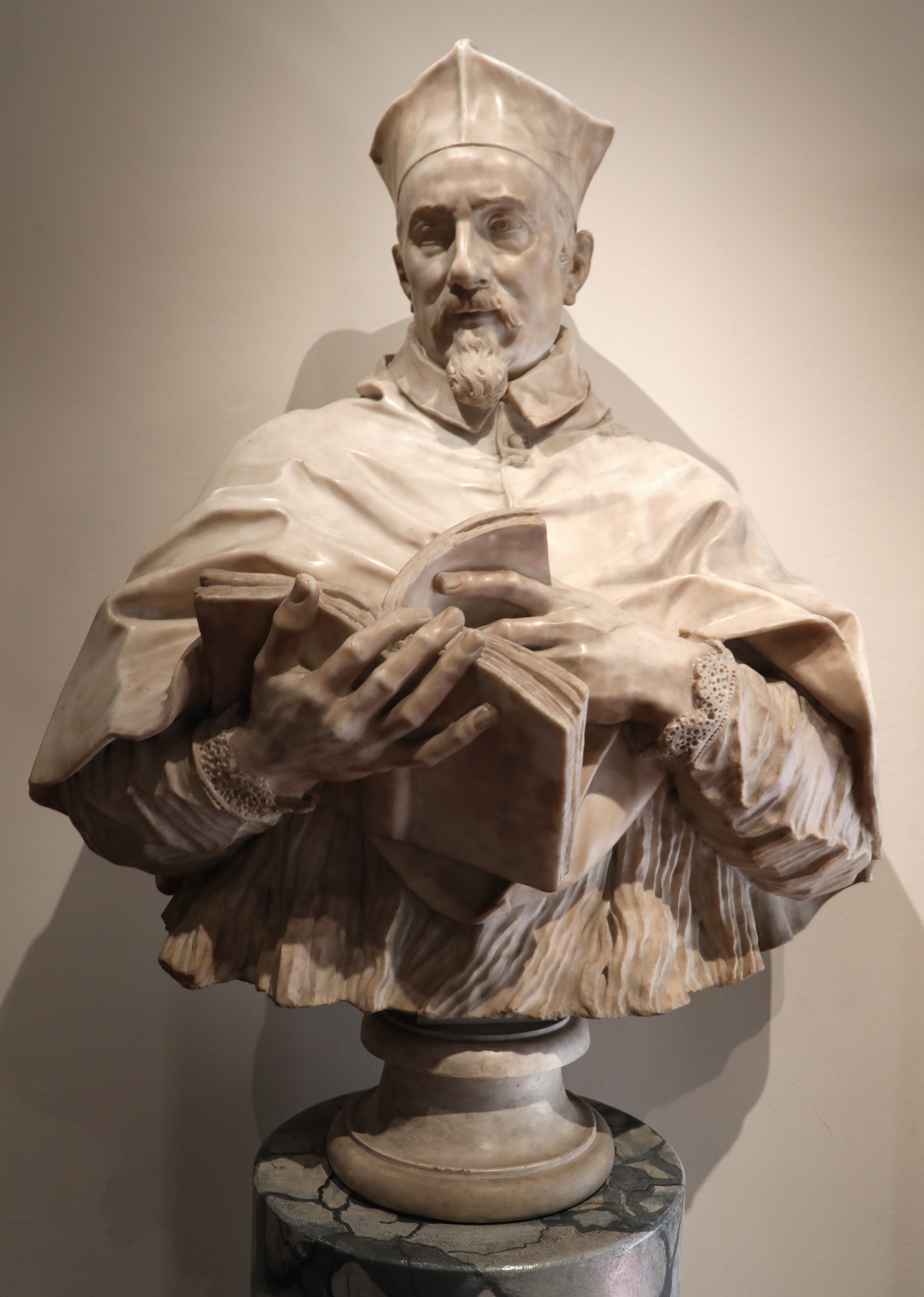
- See: Diocese of Assisi
- Installed: 5 May 1653—16 September 1668

Orders
- Created cardinal: 13 July 1643

Personal details
- Born: 1617 Rome, Papal States
- Died: 16 September 1668 (aged 45) Rome, Papal States

Paolo Emilio Rondinini (1617 – 16 September 1668) was an Italian Catholic Cardinal.

== Early life and education ==
Rondinini was born in 1617 to Alessandro Rondinini and Felice Zacchia. He was the grandson of Cardinal Laudivio Zacchia (who had been married and had two children including Felice Zacchia before accepting an ecclesiastic career) and was the grand-nephew (also on his mother's side) of Cardinal Paolo Emilio Zacchia.

He studied at the University of Perugia and then became a clerk of the Apostolic Chamber in 1637 at age 20.

During the First War of Castro he endeared himself to the Barberini and their uncle Pope Urban VIII by raising his own company of cuirassiers to fight on the side of papal forces.

== Cardinalate ==
Despite the plot by members of the Spanish faction of the College of Cardinals to unseat Pope Urban in favour of his grandfather, the Pope nonetheless made Rondinini cardinal deacon of the deaconry of S. Maria in Aquiro in the consistory of 13 July 1643. He participated in the papal conclave of 1644.

== Episcopate ==
He was elected Bishop of Assisi on 5 May 1653. He participated in the papal conclave of 1655. In the same year he opted for the deaconry of San Giorgio in Velabro, and in 1656 for that of Santa Maria in Cosmedin. Cardinal Rondinini participated in the Papal conclave of 1667. On 30 April 1668 he was promoted to the order of cardinal priests with the title of Sant'Eusebio.

He died on 16 September 1668 and was buried in the church of Santa Maria sopra Minerva (as was his grandfather) in Rome.

== References and notes ==
Catholic Church titles
Preceded by Jan Olbracht Waza	Cardinal-Deacon of Santa Maria in Aquiro; 1643–1655	Succeeded by Friedrich von Hessen-Darmstadt
Preceded by Malatesta Baglioni (bishop)	Bishop of Assisi; 1653–1668	Succeeded by Ludovicus Giustiniani
Preceded by Giovanni Stefano Donghi	Cardinal-Deacon of San Giorgio in Velabro; 1655–1656	Succeeded by Giancarlo de' Medici
Preceded by Vincenzo Costaguti	Cardinal-Deacon of Santa Maria in Cosmedin; 1656–1668	Succeeded by Carlo Gualterio
Preceded by Nicolò Guidi di Bagno	Cardinal-Priest of Sant'Eusebio; 1668	Succeeded by Carlo Gualterio
