= Aegidius Ursinus de Vivere =

Most Reverend Aegidius Ursinus de Vivere
- Titular Patriarch of Jerusalem
- Church: Catholic Church
- In office: 1641–1647
- Predecessor: Tegrimus Tegrimi
- Successor: Camillo Massimi

Orders
- Ordination: 23 April 1641
- Consecration: 28 April 1641 by Antonio Marcello Barberini

Personal details
- Born: 1577 or 1598 Liège, Prince-Bishopric of Liège
- Died: 17 April 1647

Aegidius Ursinus de Vivere or Aegidius Ursinus de Vivariis (died 17 April 1647) was a Roman Catholic prelate who served as Titular Patriarch of Jerusalem (1641–1647).

== Biography ==
Aegidius Ursinus de Vivere was born in Liège, Prince-Bishopric of Liège in 1577 or 1598. On 15 April 1641, he was appointed during the papacy of Pope Urban VIII as Titular Patriarch of Jerusalem. On 23 April 1641, and ordained a priest and on 28 Apr 1641, he was consecrated bishop by Antonio Marcello Barberini, Cardinal-Priest of San Pietro in Vincoli, with Faustus Poli, Titular Archbishop of Amasea, and Celso Zani, Bishop Emeritus of Città della Pieve, serving as co-consecrators. He served as Titular Patriarch of Jerusalem until his death on 17 April 1647.

== External links and additional sources ==
- Cheney, David M. "Patriarchate of Jerusalem {Gerusalemme}". Catholic-Hierarchy.org. (for Chronology of Bishops) ^{[self-published]}
- Chow, Gabriel. "Patriarchal See of Jerusalem (Israel)". GCatholic.org. (for Chronology of Bishops) ^{[self-published]}

Catholic Church titles
Preceded by Tegrimus Tegrimi	Titular Patriarch of Jerusalem; 1641–1647	Succeeded by Camillo Massimi
