= Pier Paolo Crescenzi =

Italian Catholic cardinal

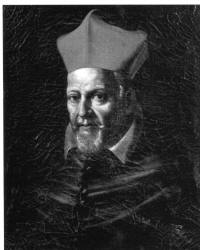

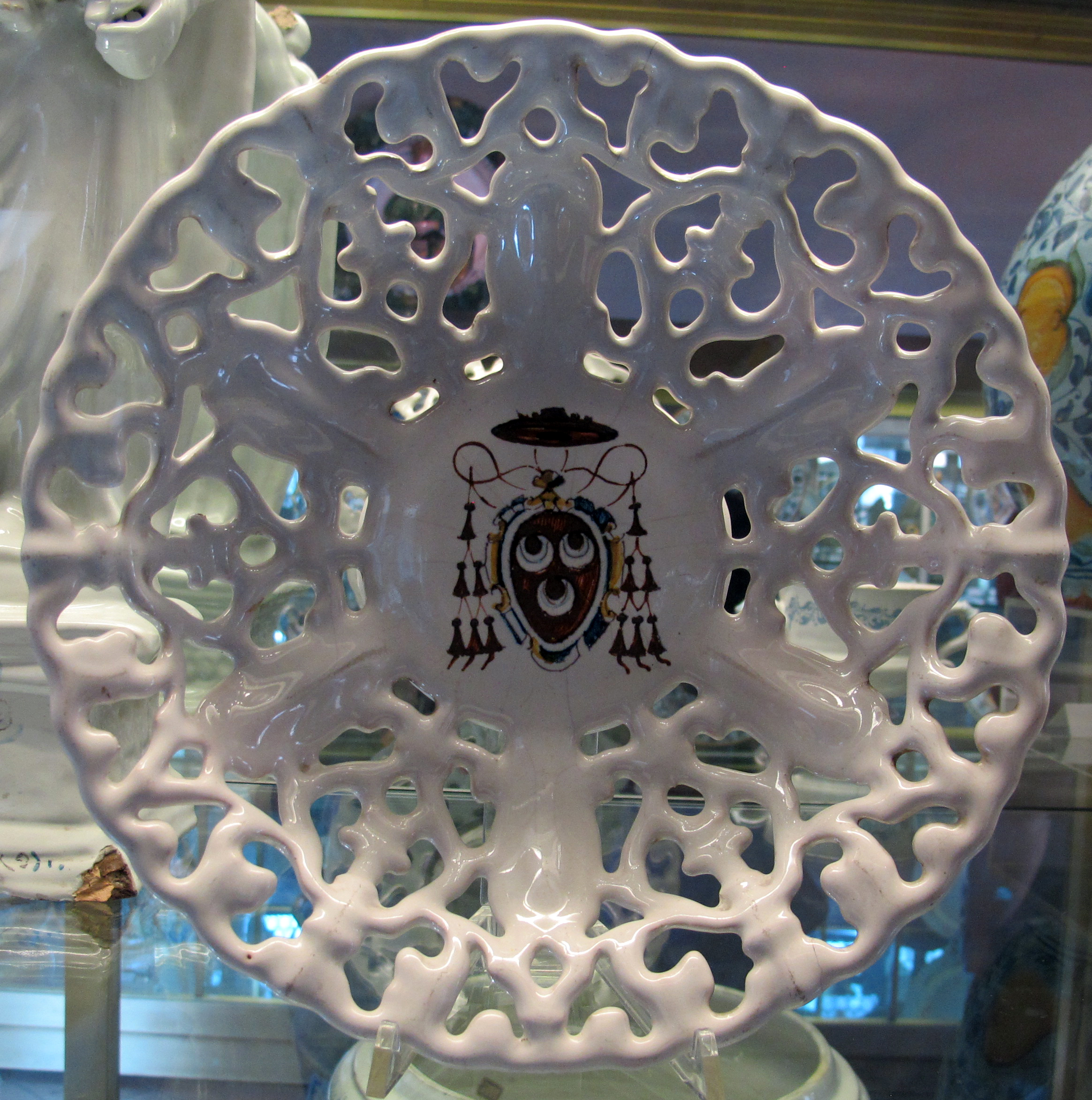
Arms of Cardinal Crescenzi on a faience plate.

Pier Paolo Crescenzi (1572 – 19 February 1645) was an Italian Catholic cardinal.

Crescenzi was born in 1572, the son of Virgilio Crescenzi, Baron of Montorio, and Costanza del Drago, of the Marquises of Riofreddo. He was the brother of artist Giovanni Battista Crescenzi. He was educated at the University of Perugia and earned a doctorate in utroque iure (Civil and Canon Law).

Very little is known about Crescenzi's early life, but on 17 August 1611 he was elevated to cardinal and installed as Cardinal-Priest of Ss. Nereo ed Achilleo. On 4 Jul 1612, he was appointed during the papacy of Pope Paul V as Bishop of Rieti. On 15 Jul 1612, he was consecrated bishop by Bonifazio Caetani, Bishop of Cassano all'Jonio, with Fabio Biondi, Titular Patriarch of Jerusalem, and Galeazzo Sanvitale, Archbishop Emeritus of Bari-Canosa, serving as co-consecrators. On 17 Mar 1621, he was appointed Bishop of Orvieto. In 1629, he was appointed Cardinal-Bishop of Palestrina, where he served for 12 years until being appointed Cardinal-Bishop of Porto-Santa Rufina in 1641. In 1644, he was made Vice-Dean of the College of Cardinals and helped to preside over the Papal conclave of 1644, but died several months later on 19 February 1645.

While bishop, he was the principal consecrator of Malatesta Baglioni, Bishop of Pesaro (1612).

Catholic Church titles
Preceded by Innocenzo Del Bufalo-Cancellieri	Cardinal-Priest of Santi Nereo ed Achilleo; 1611 - 1629	Succeeded by Antonio Santacroce
Preceded by Gaspare Pasquali	Bishop of Rieti; 1612 - 1621	Succeeded by Giovanni Battista Toschi
Preceded by Giacomo Sannesio	Bishop of Orvieto; 1621 - 1644	Succeeded by Faustus Poli
Preceded by Marcello Lante della Rovere	Cardinal-Bishop of Palestrina; 1629 - 1641	Succeeded by Guido Bentivoglio
Preceded by Marcello Lante della Rovere	Cardinal-Bishop of Porto-Santa Rufina; 1641 - 1645	Succeeded by Francesco Cennini de' Salamandri
