= Tegrimus Tegrimi =

Italian Roman Catholic prelate (1567–1641)

Most Reverend Tegrimus Tegrimi
- Titular Patriarch of Jerusalem
- Church: Catholic Church
- In office: 1638–1641
- Predecessor: Giovanni Battista Colonna
- Successor: Aegidius Ursinus de Vivere
- Previous post: Bishop of Assisi (1630–1638)

Orders
- Consecration: 7 October 1630 by Luigi Caetani

Personal details
- Born: 1567 Lucques, Tuscany, Italy
- Died: 13 March 1641 (age 74) Assisi, Italy

Tegrimus Tegrimi (1567 – 13 March 1641) was a Roman Catholic prelate who served as Titular Patriarch of Jerusalem (1638–1641) and Bishop of Assisi (1630–1638).

== Biography ==
Tegrimus Tegrimi was born in Lucques, Italy in 1567. On 23 September 1630, he was appointed during the papacy of Pope Urban VIII as Bishop of Assisi. On 7 October 1630, he was consecrated bishop by Luigi Caetani, Cardinal-Priest of Santa Pudenziana, with Antonio Ricciulli, Bishop Emeritus of Belcastro, and Benedetto Landi, Bishop of Fossombrone, serving as co-consecrators. On 1 March 1638, he was appointed during the papacy of Pope Urban VIII as Titular Patriarch of Jerusalem. He served as Titular Patriarch of Jerusalem until his death on 13 March 1641.

== Episcopal succession ==
While bishop, he was the principal co-consecrator of:

- Sebastian Müller, Titular Bishop of Adramyttium and Auxiliary Bishop of Augsburg (1631);
- Dionisio Tomacelli, Bishop of Castro di Puglia (1631);
- Scipione Pannocchieschi d'Elci, Bishop of Pienza (1631); and
- Felice Franceschini, Bishop of Andria (1632).

== External links and additional sources ==
- Cheney, David M. "Diocese of Assisi-Nocera Umbra-Gualdo Tadino". Catholic-Hierarchy.org. (for Chronology of Bishops) ^{[self-published]}
- Chow, Gabriel. "Diocese of Assisi-Nocera Umbra-Gualdo Tadino (Italy)". GCatholic.org. (for Chronology of Bishops) ^{[self-published]}
- Cheney, David M. "Patriarchate of Jerusalem {Gerusalemme}". Catholic-Hierarchy.org. (for Chronology of Bishops) ^{[self-published]}
- Chow, Gabriel. "Patriarchal See of Jerusalem (Israel)". GCatholic.org. (for Chronology of Bishops) ^{[self-published]}

Catholic Church titles
Preceded by Marcello Crescenzi (bishop)	Bishop of Assisi; 1630–1638	Succeeded by Malatesta Baglioni (bishop)
Preceded by Giovanni Battista Colonna	Titular Patriarch of Jerusalem; 1638–1641	Succeeded by Aegidius Ursinus de Vivere
