= Laudivio Zacchia =

Italian cardinal (1565–1637)

His Eminence Laudivio Zacchia
- Cardinal-Priest of San Pietro in Vincoli
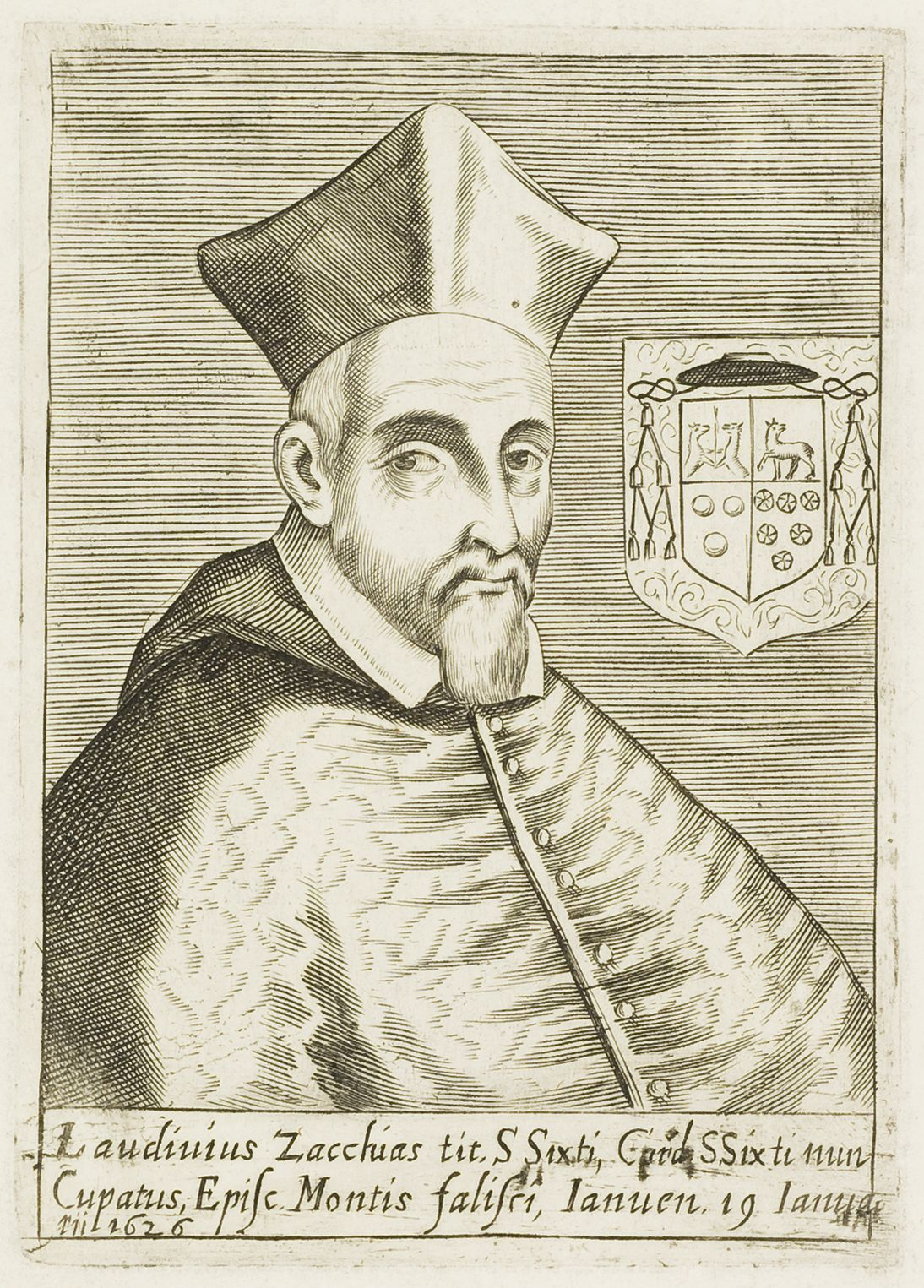
- Church: Roman Catholic Church
- Appointed: 17 September 1629
- Term ended: 30 August 1637
- Predecessor: Luigi Capponi
- Successor: Antonio Marcello Barberini
- Previous posts: Bishop of Montefiascone (1605-30); Bishop of Corneto (1605-30); Prefect of the Apostolic Palace (1624-26); Cardinal-Priest of San Sisto (1626-29)

Orders
- Ordination: 26 July 1605 by Pietro Aldobrandini
- Consecration: 28 August 1605 by Pietro Aldobrandini
- Created cardinal: 19 January 1626 by Pope Urban VIII
- Rank: Cardinal-Priest

Personal details
- Born: 1565 Vezzano, Kingdom of Piedmont-Sardinia
- Died: 30 August 1637 (aged 71-72) Rome, Papal States
- Buried: Santa Maria sopra Minerva
- Parents: Gaspare Zacchia; Veronica de' Nobili
- Education: University of Pisa

Laudivio Zacchia (1565 – 30 August 1637) was an Italian Catholic cardinal.

== Early life ==
Zacchia was born in 1565 at the Castle of Vezzano, the son of Gaspare Zacchia and Veronica de' Nobili, of the signori of Vezzano.

It was not Zacchia's original intention to serve an ecclesiastic life. He originally married Laura Biassa and had a son and a daughter; Felice Zacchia (mother of Cardinal Paolo Emilio Rondinini). However, after his wife died, he left Vezzano and went to Rome to aid his brother, Cardinal Paolo Emilio Zacchia. There he worked in the Roman Curia and later became pro-treasurer of the Apostolic Chamber and later its commissary-general.

== Ecclesiastic career ==
On 17 August 1605 he was named bishop of Montefiascone, a bishopric which had previously been held by his brother. Both undertook works on the cathedral there.

During the papacy of Pope Paul V, Zacchia was named vice-legate in Viterbo and vice-legate of the province of the Patrimony. Pope Gregory XV appointed Zacchia as nuncio to Venice, where he served from 1621 until December 1623.

In 1626, Pope Urban VIII made him a cardinal in the consistory of 19 January 1626 and he was named cardinal-priest at San Sisto Vecchio the following month, then opted for the title of San Pietro in Vincoli in 1629.

Between 1631 and his death in 1637, Zacchia was named crown-cardinal of the Republic of Genoa.

Zacchia was one of three cardinals who did not subscribe to the condemnation of Galileo in 1633.

== Bid to remove Pope Urban VIII ==
According to his contemporary John Bargrave, in 1636 members of the Spanish faction of the College of Cardinals were so horrified by the conduct of Pope Urban VIII that they conspired to have him arrested and imprisoned (or killed) so that they could replace him with a new pope; namely Zacchia. When Urban travelled to Castel Gandolfo to rest, the members of the Spanish faction met in secret and discussed ways to progress their plan. But they were discovered and the pope raced back to Rome where he immediately held a consistory and demanded to know who the new pope was. To put an end to the conspiracy, the pope decreed that all cardinal-bishops should leave Rome and return to their own churches.

As it was, Zacchia died the following year, in 1637, and was buried in the chapel of Saint Domenico at the Church of Santa Maria sopra Minerva in Rome.
