= Orazio Giustiniani =

Italian Catholic Cardinal (1580–1649)

His Eminence Orazio Giustiniani C.O.
- Librarian of the Vatican Library
- Church: Roman Catholic
- Appointed: 25 September 1646
- Term ended: 25 July 1649
- Predecessor: Antonio Marcello Barberini
- Successor: Luigi Capponi
- Other posts: Major Penitentiary of the Apostolic Penitentiary (1647–49); Cardinal-Priest of Sant'Onofrio (1645–49)
- Previous posts: Bishop of Nocera Umbra (1645–46); Bishop of Montalto (1640–45)

Orders
- Consecration: 16 September 1640 by Giovanni Battista Pamphili
- Created cardinal: 6 March 1645 by Pope Innocent X
- Rank: Cardinal-Priest

Personal details
- Born: 28 February 1580 Chios, Republic of Genoa
- Died: 25 July 1649 (aged 69) Rome, Papal States
- Buried: Santa Maria in Vallicella

Orazio Giustiniani (28 February 1580 – 25 July 1649) was an Italian Catholic Cardinal.

== Biography ==
Giustiniani was born the Island of Chios, then part of the Republic of Genoa, to the powerful Giustiniani family. He was a relative of two Bishops of Chio - Girolamo Giustiniani (1599–1604) and Marco Giustiniani (1604–1640). He entered the Congregation of the Oratory of Saint Philip Neri in 1603, only 8 years after the death of Philip Neri.

He was named, by Cardinal Antonio Barberini (brother of then-Pope Urban VIII), superintendent of the abbey of Farfa and custodian of the Vatican Library in 1630.

In 1627, the Congregation of Propaganda Fide proposed sending Giustiniani to Ancona for secret talks with Cyril Lucaris, patriarch of the Eastern Orthodox Church. Church leaders were concerned by news Lucaris was trying to reform his reform of Orthodox church along Protestant and Calvinist lines. Lucaris had already been opposed by those within his own communion and by the Jesuits but the Church planned to send Giusitniani to secretly negotiate recognition of Lucaris as the legitimate Roman Catholic Church-backed patriarch of the Eastern Orthodox Church.

Giustiniani refused, citing a desire to remain with his Oratory congregation. He refused the mission again on at least one other occasion but was finally convinced to travel to Ancona in 1635.

However, by the time Giustiniani arrived, Lucaris had made a confession of faith which concerned Roman Church leadership and he was met by Atanasio Patelerio, a rival of Lucaris who claimed to have control of Constantinople and the Eastern Church. He returned later that year to Rome (via Venice) to present Patelerio to the Pope to be recognized as legitimate patriarch. Pope Urban VIII was not convinced and instead entrusted the decision to a panel of advisors including his brother (and Giustiniani mentor), Antonio Barberini.

There are reports Patelerio hurt his own chances by later going into Rome and blessing the people with a cross raised above his head; actions that created confusion and concern among the citizenry.

Giustiniani returned to Ancona with Patelerio and suggested he should make his own confession to gain favour with the Pope. Patelerio did so but it did not prevent Lucaris from being restored as Patriarch yet again.

Giustiniani returned to Rome and to his position as custodian of the Vatican Library. He was consecrated on 16 September 1640, in Rome, by Cardinal Giovanni Battista Pamphili and was appointed Bishop of Nocera. Four years later, Pamphili was elected to the Papal Throne as Pope Innocent X and Giustiniani was elevated to Cardinal on 6 March 1645. He served as Librarian of the Holy Roman Church from 25 September 1646 until his death and Major Penitentiary from 4 December 1647 until his death.

Giustiniani died on 25 July 1649 and was buried in the church of Santa Maria in Vallicella, a church of his Congregation of the Oratory.

== Episcopal succession ==
While bishop, he was the principal consecrator of:

- Domenico Carnevale, Bishop of Isola (1646);
- Stefano Martini, Bishop of Noli (1646);
- Mario Montani, Bishop of Nocera Umbra (1646);
- Ignazio Ciantes, Bishop of Sant'Angelo dei Lombardi e Bisaccia (1647);

and the principal co-consecrator of:

- Niccolò Albergati-Ludovisi, Archbishop of Bologna (1645).

== Family connections ==
Little is known of Giustiniani's immediate family but it seems certain there was some form of familial link to Olimpia Giustiniani, her grandmother Olimpia Maidalchini and grand-uncle Giovanni Battista Pamphili (later Pope Innocent X who elevated Orazio Giustiniani to cardinal). Olimpia married Maffeo Barberini, great-nephew of Antonio Barberini and Pope Urban VIII.
