= Roman Catholic Diocese of Gualdo Tadino =

The Diocese of Gualdo Tadino (Latin: Dioecesis Tadinensis) was a Roman Catholic diocese located in the town of Gualdo Tadino in the province of Perugia in northeastern Umbria, on the lower flanks of Mt. Penna, a mountain of the Apennines. In 1915, it was united with the Diocese of Nocera Umbra to form the Diocese of Nocera Umbra-Gualdo Tadino. Other sources indicate that it was suppressed to the Diocese of Nocera Umbra in 1066.

== Ordinaries ==
- Gaudenzio (499–?)
- Saint Facondino (599 – 607 Aug 28), Death

== See also ==
- Catholic Church in Italy
