= Castelleone, Deruta =

Castelleone
- Frazione
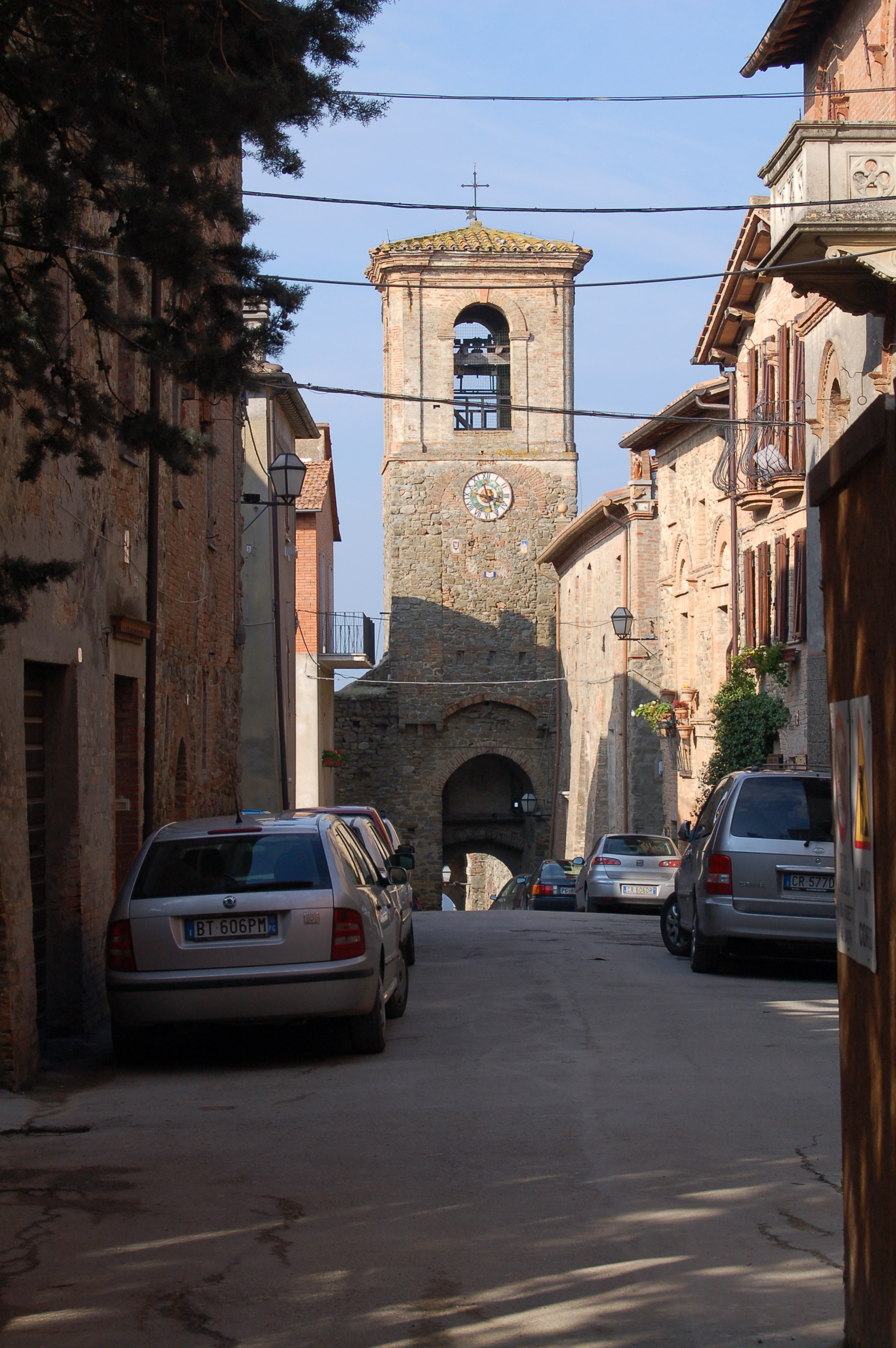

- Location of Castelleone in Italy
- Coordinates: 42°57′55″N 12°26′44″E
- Country: Italy
- Region: Umbria
- Province: Perugia
- Comune: Deruta
- Elevation: 398 m (1,306 ft)

Population (2001)
  - Total: 91
- Time zone: UTC+1 (CET)
  - Summer (DST): UTC+2 (CEST)
- Dialing code: 0742

Castelleone is a frazione of the comune of Deruta in the Province of Perugia, Umbria, central Italy. It stands at an elevation of 398 metres above sea level. At the time of the Istat census of 2001 it had 91 inhabitants.
