= Malatesta Baglioni (bishop) =

Roman Catholic bishop (1581–1648)

Most Reverend Malatesta Baglioni
- Bishop of Assisi
- Church: Catholic Church
- Diocese: Diocese of Assisi
- In office: 1641–1648
- Predecessor: Tegrimus Tegrimi
- Successor: Paolo Emilio Rondinini
- Previous posts: Bishop of Pesaro (1612–1641); Apostolic Nuncio to Emperor (1634–1639)

Orders
- Ordination: Jan 1612
- Consecration: 25 Jul 1612 by Pier Paolo Crescenzi

Personal details
- Born: 1 Jan 1581 Perugia, Italy
- Died: 11 Feb 1648 (age 67) Assisi, Italy

Malatesta Baglioni (1581–1648) was a Roman Catholic prelate who served as Bishop of Assisi (1641–1648), Apostolic Nuncio to Emperor (1634–1639), Bishop of Pesaro (1612–1641).

== Biography ==
Malatesta Baglioni was born on 1 Jan 1581 in Perugia, Italy and ordained a priest in Jan 1612. On 16 Jul 1612, he was appointed during the papacy of Pope Paul V as Bishop of Pesaro. On 25 Jul 1612, he was consecrated bishop by Pier Paolo Crescenzi, Cardinal-Priest of Santi Nereo ed Achilleo, with Ottavio Accoramboni, Bishop Emeritus of Fossombrone, and Giulio Sansedoni, Bishop Emeritus of Grosseto, serving as co-consecrators. On 8 Jul 1634, he was appointed during the papacy of Pope Urban VIII as Apostolic Nuncio to Emperor; he resigned from the position on 8 Aug 1639. On 16 Sep 1641, he was appointed during the papacy of Pope Urban VIII as Bishop of Assisi. He served as Bishop of Assisi until his death on 11 Feb 1648 in Assisi, Italy.

While bishop, he was the principal consecrator of Franz Wilhelm von Wartenberg, Bishop of Osnabrück (1636); and Anselm Casimir Wambold von Umstadt, Archbishop of Mainz (1636).

== External links and additional sources ==
- Cheney, David M. "Archdiocese of Pesaro". Catholic-Hierarchy.org. (for Chronology of Bishops) ^{[self-published]}
- Chow, Gabriel. "Metropolitan Archdiocese of Pesaro (Italy)". GCatholic.org. (for Chronology of Bishops) ^{[self-published]}
- Cheney, David M. "Nunciature to Emperor (Germany)". Catholic-Hierarchy.org. (for Chronology of Bishops) ^{[self-published]}
- Cheney, David M. "Diocese of Assisi-Nocera Umbra-Gualdo Tadino". Catholic-Hierarchy.org. (for Chronology of Bishops) ^{[self-published]}
- Chow, Gabriel. "Diocese of Assisi-Nocera Umbra-Gualdo Tadino (Italy)". GCatholic.org. (for Chronology of Bishops) ^{[self-published]}

Catholic Church titles
Preceded by Bartolomeo Giorgi	Bishop of Pesaro; 1612–1641	Succeeded by Giovanni Francesco Passionei
Preceded by Ciriaco Rocci	Apostolic Nuncio to Emperor; 1634–1639	Succeeded by Gaspare Mattei
Preceded by Tegrimus Tegrimi	Bishop of Assisi; 1641–1648	Succeeded by aolo Emilio Rondinini
