= Roman Catholic Diocese of Nocera Umbra-Gualdo Tadino =

Coordinates: 43.0693°N 12.6141°E

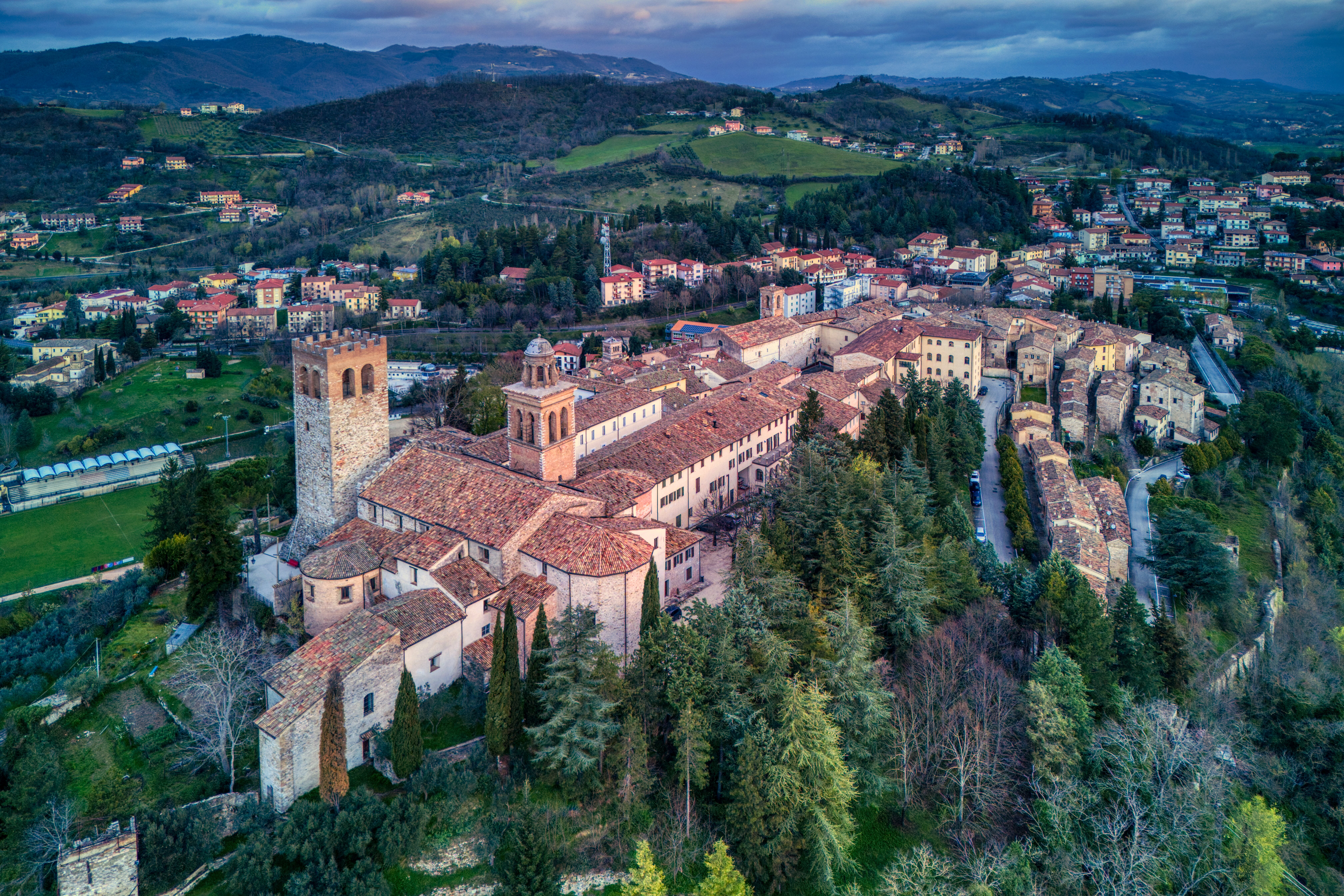
View of Santa Maria Assunta co-cathedral in Nocera Umbra

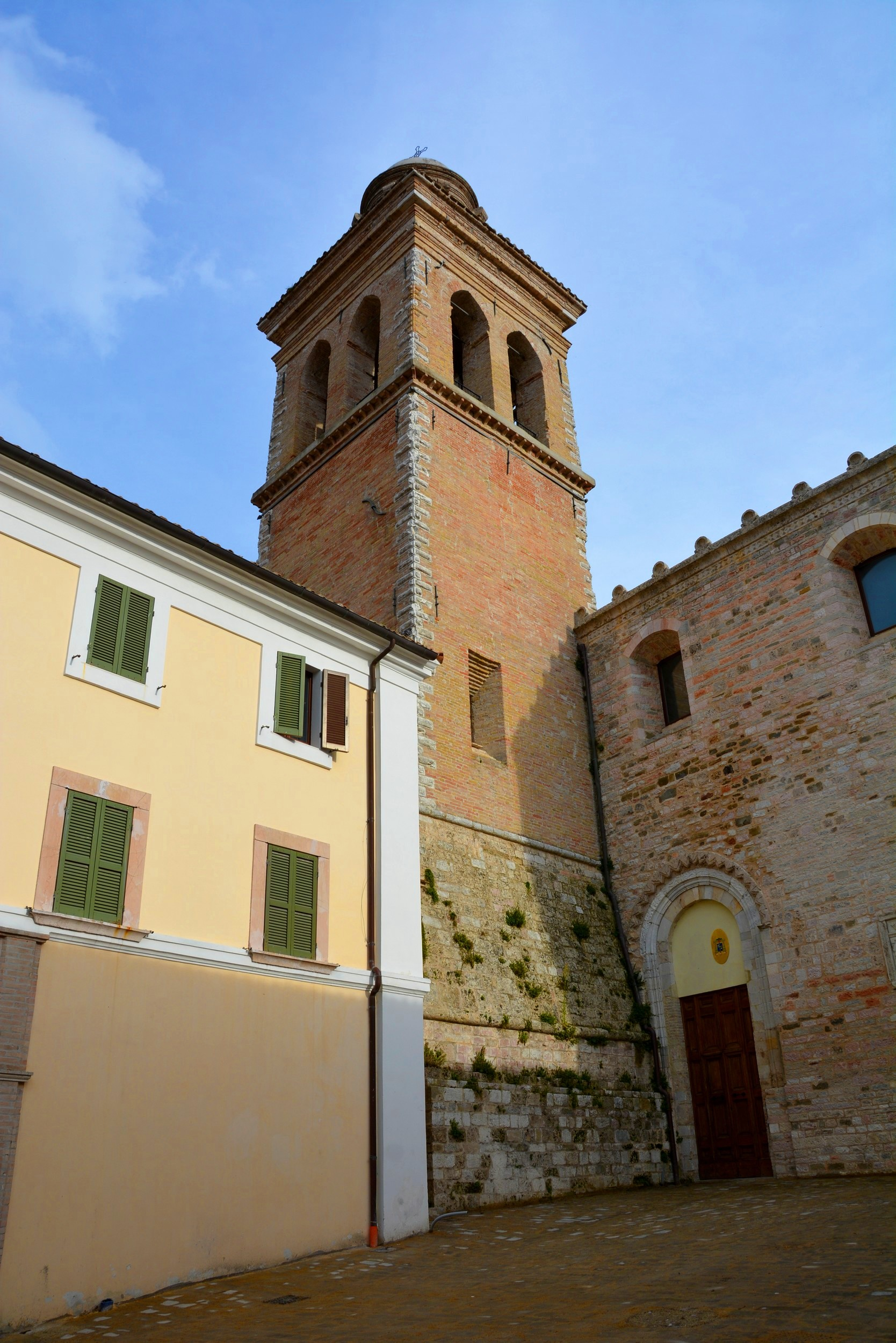
Side entrance of the Cathedral and campanile, Nocera Umbra

The Diocese of Nocera Umbra was a Catholic diocese in Umbria, Italy (Nocera Umbra in the Province of Perugia specifically) that was united in 1915 with the Diocese of Gualdo Tadino to form the Diocese of Nocera Umbra-Gualdo Tadino. In 1986, this was united with the Diocese of Assisi, to become the Diocese of Assisi-Nocera Umbra-Gualdo Tadino.

== History ==
Traditionally the founding bishop was Saint Crispoldus, one of the seventy disciples sent out by the Apostles, a claim considered doubtful due to the Germanic origin of his name.

The city of Nocera was destroyed in 546 by Totila, and again destroyed by the Lombards in the middle of the 8th century.

Authentic Bishops were Saint Felix (412) and Liutardus (824); others were:

- Giovanni Marcolini (1446), who restored the cathedral;
- Francesco Luigi Piervissani (1800), exiled in 1809 because he refused the oath of allegiance to Napoleon.

In 1669, the cathedral was dedicated to S. Rinaldo, and had a Chapter composed of two dignities (the Provost and the Archdeacon, neither of whom had a prebend) and ten Canons. The entire diocese contained some 20,000 inhabitants, and the city of Nocera about 1,000. In 1768, the cathedral, dedicated to the Assumption of the Body of the Virgin Mary into Heaven, was administered by a Chapter, composed of two dignities (the Provost and the Archdeacon) and ten Canons.

== Bishops ==
=== Diocese of Nocera Umbra ===
==== to 1200 ====
...
[Caelius Laurentius] (attested 499–501)
[Aprilis] (attested 502)
...
[Numerius] (attested 593)
[Primenius] (attested 598)
...

- Liutardus (attested 826)
- Racipertus (attested 844, 853)

...

- Julianus (attested 967, 968)

...

- Romanus
- Dodo (1024, 1027, 1028)

...

- Ludovicus (attested 1057, 1059)

...

- Augustinus (attested 1114)

...

- Lotarius (attested 1125)
- Laurentius (attested 1131)
- Monaldus de Actis
- Anfredus de Actis
- Anselm
- Hugo de Trinci (1196–1222)

==== from 1200 to 1500 ====
- Rainaldus, O.S.B. (1222–1225)
- Pelagius Pallavicini (1225–1228)
- Constantius (1228–1229?)
- Bevegnatus Capucci ( –1233)
- Guido Negusanti (1233–1252)
- Aegidius (1243–1248)
- Bernardus (1248–1254)
- Filippo Oderisi (1254-1285)
- Fidesmidus (Fidemundus) 1285–1288)
- Joannes Antignani (1288–1327)
- Alexander, O.Min. (1327–1363)
- Lucas Rodolfucci (1363–1389)
- Joannes Nucaranus, O.Min. (1379– ) (Avignon Obedience)
- Cinthius (1389–1403)
- Andreas de Montefalco (1404–1419)
- Thomas Morganti, O.Cist. (1419–1437)
- Antonius Nicolai (1438–1444)
- Joannes Marcolini, O.Min. (1444–1465)
- Antonius Viminale (1465–1472)
- Giacomo Minutoli (1472–1476)
- Giovanni Cerretani (17 Aug 1476 – Jul 1492 Died)
- Giacomo Breuquet (31 Aug 1492 – 25 May 1498 Died)
- Matteo Baldeschi (degli Ubaldi) (1498–1508)

==== from 1500 to 1800 ====
- Ludovico Clodio (28 Jul 1508 – Jul 1514 Died)
- Guarino Favorino, O.S.B. (30 Oct 1514 – 1 May 1537 Died)
- Angelo Colocci (1 May 1537 – 15 Jun 1545 Resigned)
- Girolamo Mannelli (15 Jun 1545 – 21 Feb 1592 Died)
- Roberto Pierbenedetti (1592–1604)
- Virgilio Fiorenzi (Fiorentini) (27 Jun 1605 – 9 Dec 1644 Died)
- Orazio Giustiniani, C.O. (16 Jan 1645 –1646)
- Mario Montani (25 Jun 1646 – 31 Dec 1668 Died)
- Giovanni Battista Amati (5 Aug 1669 – Oct 1689 Died)
- Marco Battista Battaglini (17 Apr 1690 –1716)
- Alessandro Borgia (1 Jul 1716 –1724)
- Giovanni Battista Chiappé, O.S.H. (20 Nov 1724 – Mar 1768 Died)
- Francesco Lorenzo Massajoli (1768–1800)

==== since 1800 ====
- Francesco Luigi Piervisani (22 Dec 1800 – 15 Jan 1848 Died)
- Francesco Agostini (14 Apr 1848 – 4 Feb 1861 Died)
- Antonio Maria Pettinari, O.F.M. (21 Dec 1863 – 18 Nov 1881 Appointed, Archbishop of Urbino)
- Rocco Anselmini (27 Mar 1882 – Aug 1910 Died)
- Nicola Cola (26 Aug 1910 – 14 Apr 1940 Died)

=== Diocese of Nocera Umbra-Gualdo Tadino ===
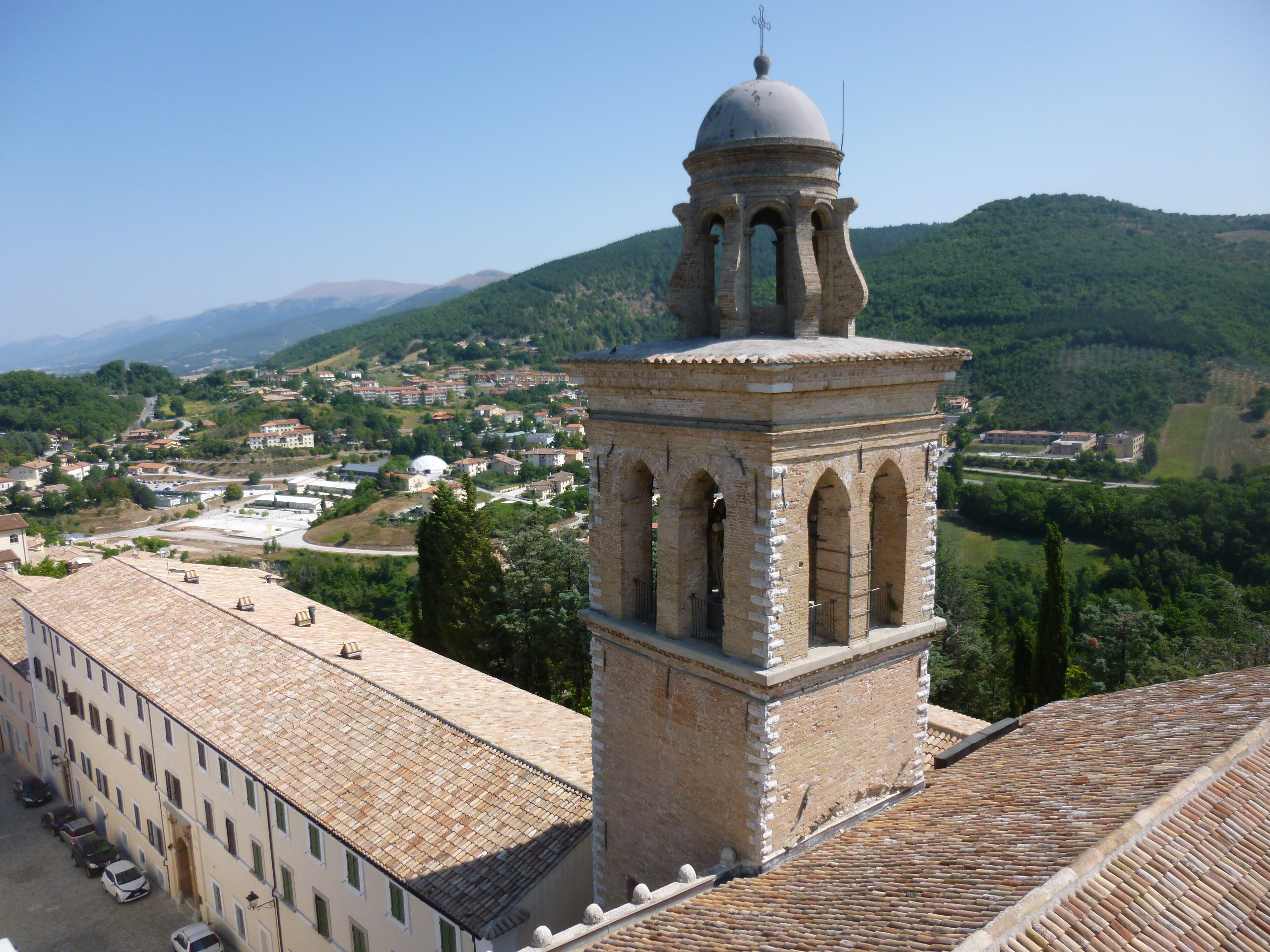
Campanile of the Co-cathedral of Nocera Umbra

United: 2 January 1915 with the Diocese of Gualdo Tadino
Latin Name: Nucerinus-Tadinensis
Metropolitan: Archdiocese of Perugia

- Domenico Ettorre (1 Jul 1940 – 31 Oct 1943 Died)
- Costantino Stella (18 Jan 1945 – 5 Jul 1950 Appointed, Archbishop of L'Aquila)
- Giuseppe Pronti (1 Jan 1951 – 3 Feb 1974 Died)
- Dino Tomassini (12 Dec 1974 – 30 Jul 1980 Died)
- Sergio Goretti (14 Dec 1980 – 30 Sep 1986 Appointed, Bishop of Assisi-Nocera Umbra-Gualdo Tadino)

30 September 1986: United with the Diocese of Assisi to form the Diocese of Assisi-Nocera Umbra-Gualdo Tadino

== Bibliography ==
=== Reference for bishops ===
- Gams, Pius Bonifatius (1873). Series episcoporum Ecclesiae catholicae: quotquot innotuerunt a beato Petro apostolo. Ratisbon: Typis et Sumptibus Georgii Josephi Manz. pp. 709–710. (in Latin)
- Eubel, Conradus, ed. (1913). Hierarchia catholica (in Latin). Vol. Tomus 1 (second ed.). Münster: Libreria Regensbergiana.
- Eubel, Conradus, ed. (1914). Hierarchia catholica (in Latin). Vol. Tomus 2 (second ed.). Münster: Libreria Regensbergiana.
- Eubel, Conradus; Gulik, Guilelmus, eds. (1923). Hierarchia catholica (in Latin). Vol. Tomus 3 (second ed.). Münster: Libreria Regensbergiana.
- Gauchat, Patritius (Patrice) (1935). Hierarchia catholica (in Latin). Vol. Tomus IV (1592-1667). Münster: Libraria Regensbergiana.
- Ritzler, Remigius; Sefrin, Pirminus (1952). Hierarchia catholica medii et recentis aevi V (1667-1730) (in Latin). Patavii: Messagero di S. Antonio.
- Ritzler, Remigius; Sefrin, Pirminus (1958). Hierarchia catholica medii et recentis aevi (in Latin). Vol. Tomus VI (1730-1799). Patavii: Messagero di S. Antonio.
- Ritzler, Remigius; Sefrin, Pirminus (1968). Hierarchia Catholica medii et recentioris aevi sive summorum pontificum, S. R. E. cardinalium, ecclesiarum antistitum series... A pontificatu Pii PP. VII (1800) usque ad pontificatum Gregorii PP. XVI (1846) (in Latin). Vol. VII. Monasterii: Libr. Regensburgiana.
- Remigius Ritzler; Pirminus Sefrin (1978). Hierarchia catholica Medii et recentioris aevi... A Pontificatu PII PP. IX (1846) usque ad Pontificatum Leonis PP. XIII (1903) (in Latin). Vol. VIII. Il Messaggero di S. Antonio.
- Pięta, Zenon (2002). Hierarchia catholica medii et recentioris aevi (in Latin). Vol. IX (1903–1922). Padua: Messagero di San Antonio. ISBN 978-88-250-1000-8.

=== Studies ===
- Castellucci, Antonio (1916). La cattedrale di Nocera Umbra, Perugia: Unione tipografica cooperativa. [Estratto dall'Archivio per la Storia ecelesiastica dell’ Umbria, Volume III] (in Italian)
- Kehr, Paul Fridolin (1909). Italia pontificia Vol. IV (Berlin: Weidmann 1909), pp. 51–55. (in Latin)
- Lanzoni, Francesco (1927). Le diocesi d'Italia dalle origini al principio del secolo VII (an. 604), Faenza 1927, pp. 242–245.
- Schwartz, Gerhard (1907). Die Besetzung der Bistümer Reichsitaliens unter den sächsischen und salischen Kaisern: mit den Listen der Bischöfe, 951-1122. Leipzig: B.G. Teubner. pp. 286–287. (in German)
- Ughelli, Ferdinando; Coleti, Niccolò (1717). Italia sacra sive De Episcopis Italiae, et insularum adjacentium (in Latin). Vol. Tomus primus. Venice: apud Sebastianum Coleti. pp. 513–565.
- Vincioli, Giacinto (1734). Vite di IX soggetti della famiglia Vincioli (in Italian). Perugia: Constantini. pp. 77–90.
