= Tivoli Cathedral =

Roman Catholic cathedral in Tivoli, Lazio, Italy

Coordinates: 41°57′56″N 12°47′48″E

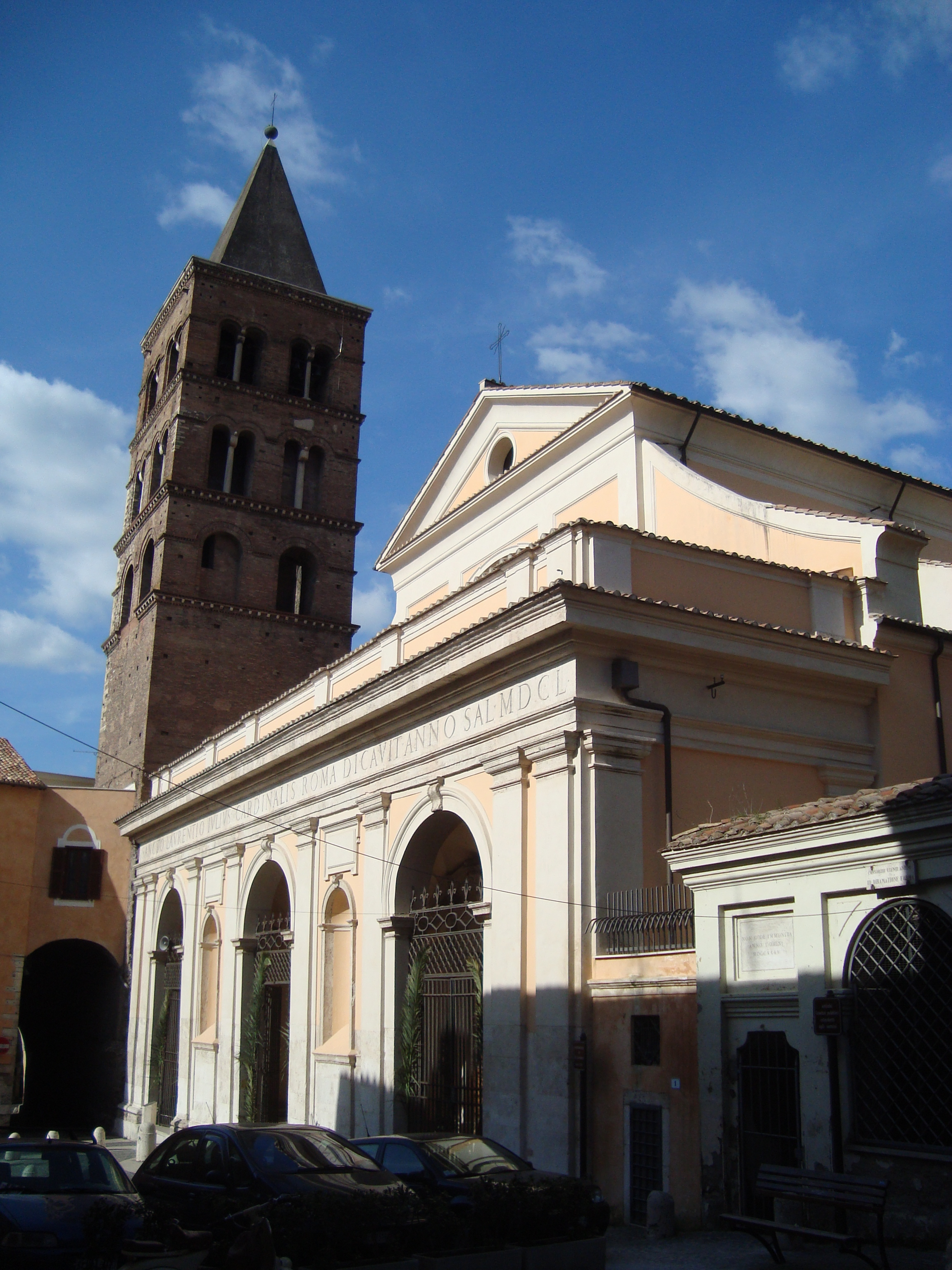
Portico and campanile from the south-west.

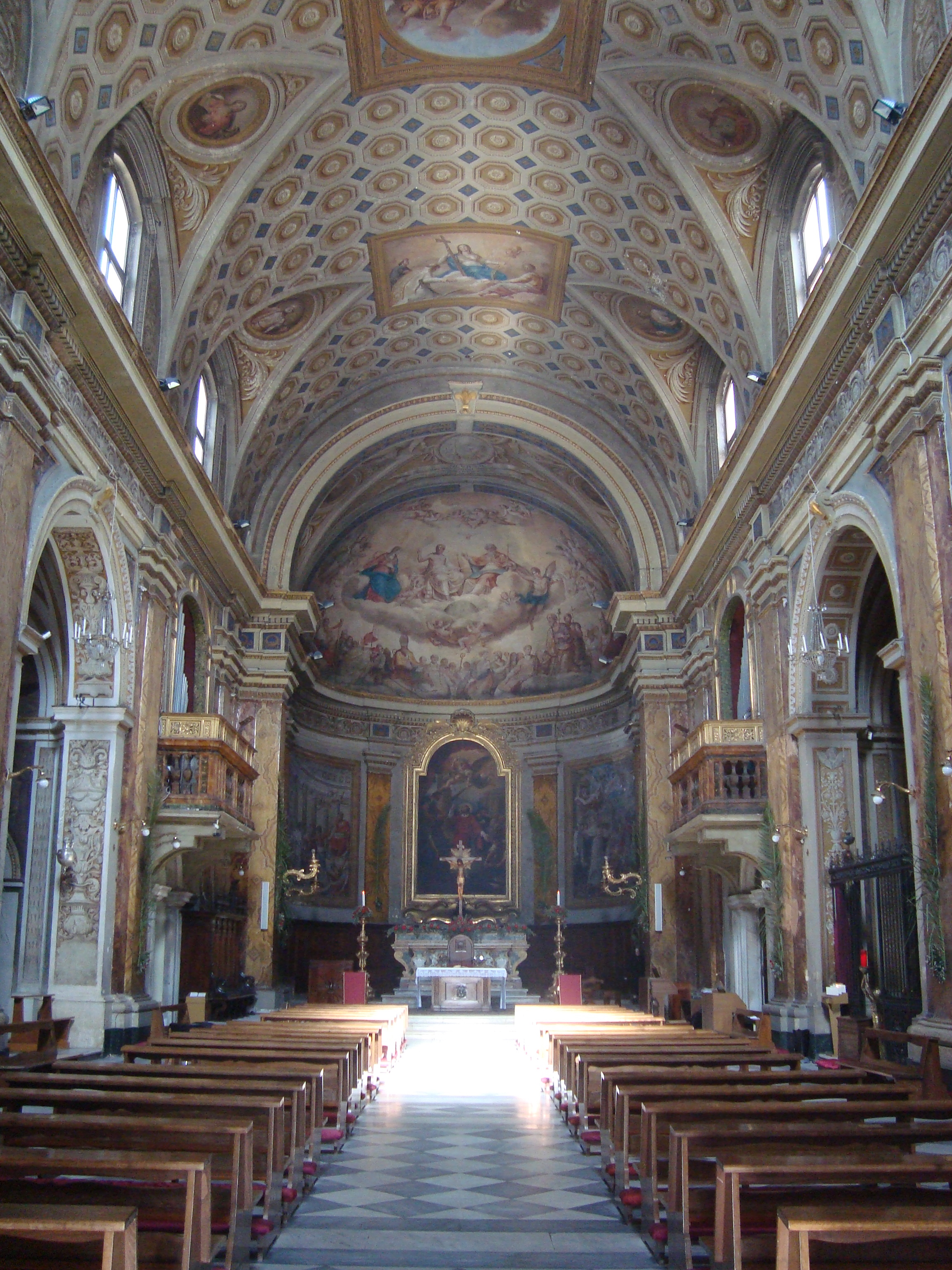
The nave.

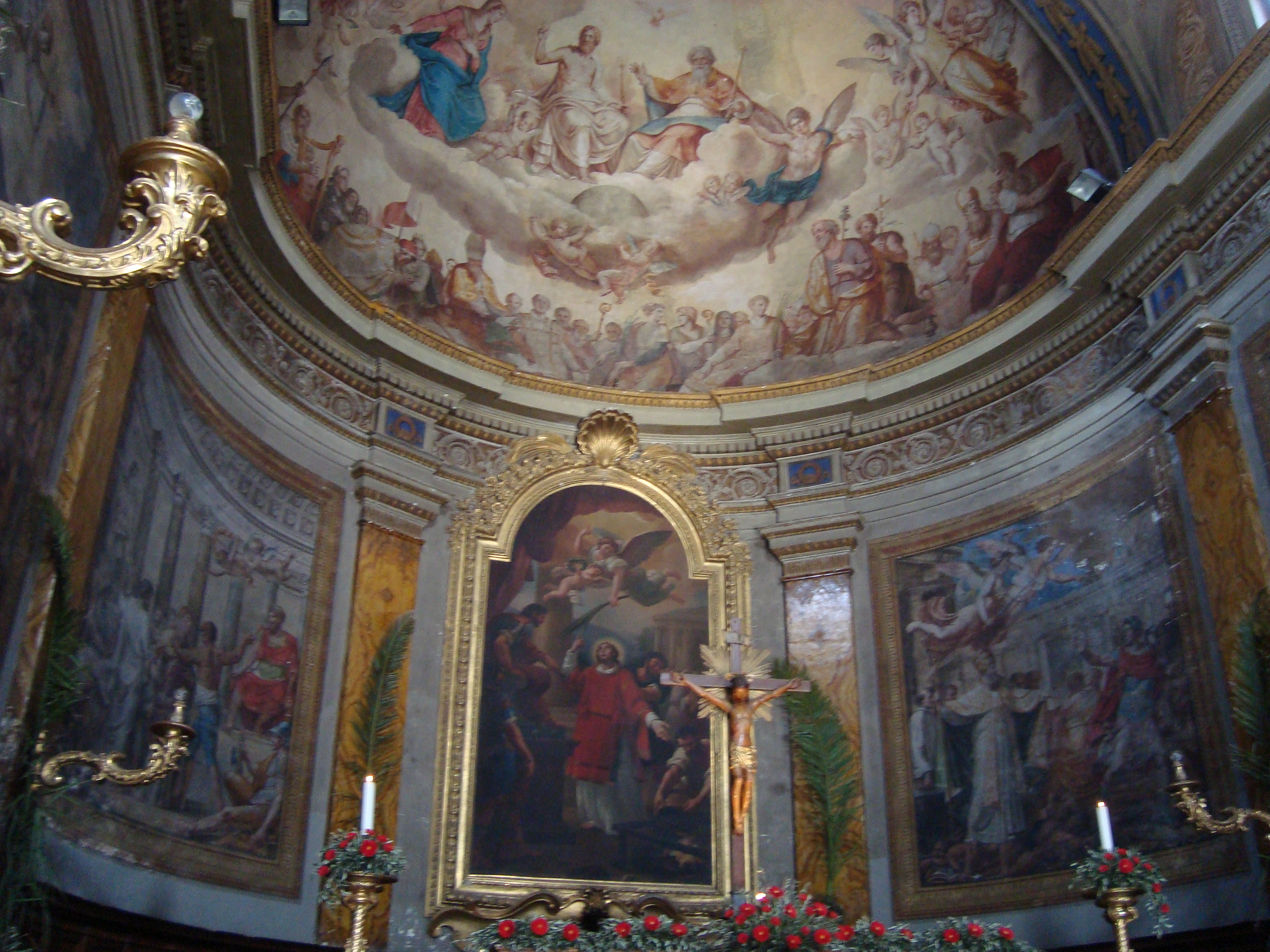
Decorations of the apse.

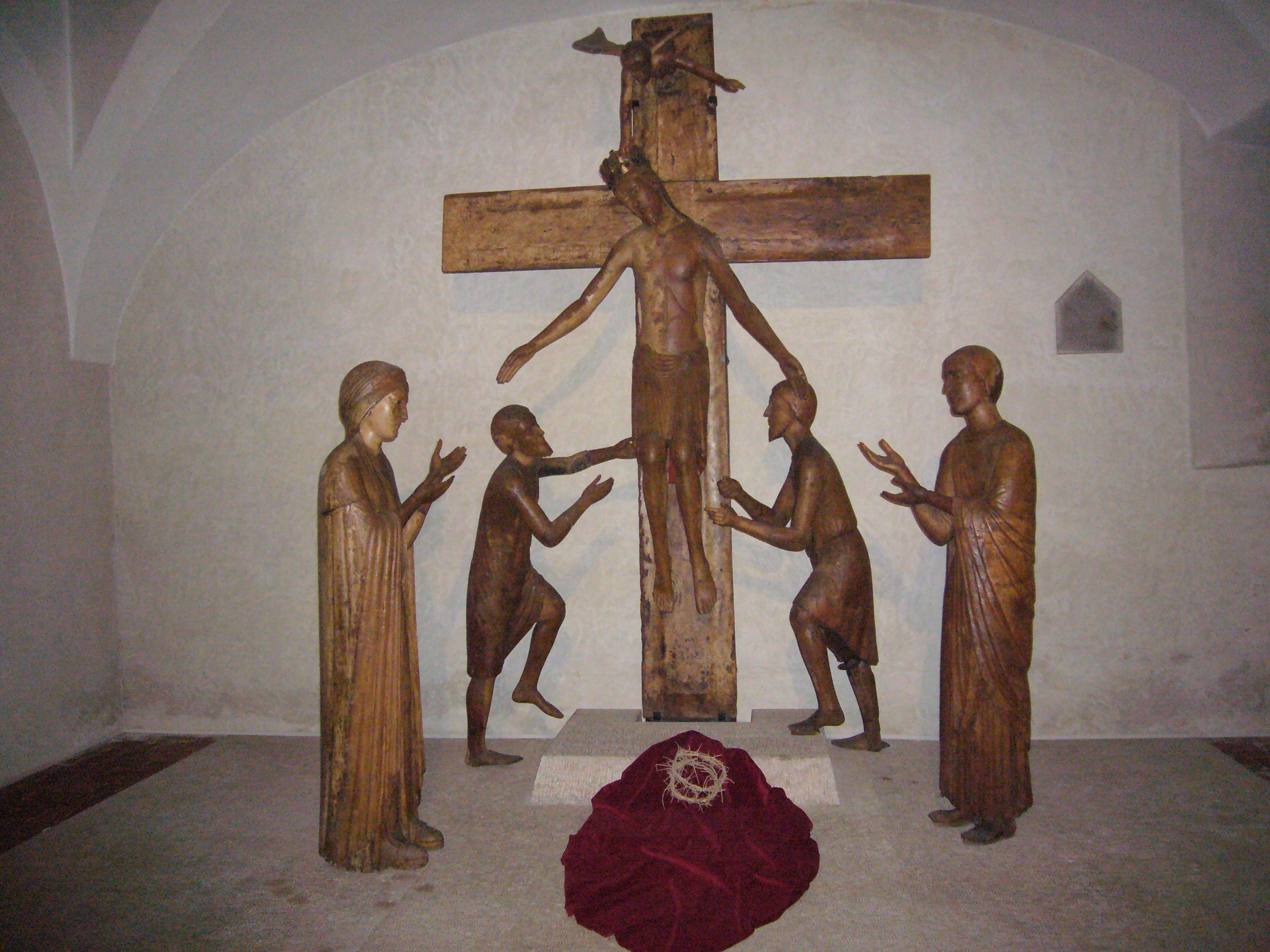
Sculpture group of the Descent from the Cross (early 13th century).

Tivoli Cathedral (Italian: Duomo di Tivoli or Basilica Cattedrale di San Lorenzo Martire) is a Roman Catholic cathedral, dedicated to Saint Lawrence, in Tivoli, Lazio, Italy. It is the seat of the bishop of Tivoli.

== History ==
According to a legend, it was built by Emperor Constantine after the Edict of Milan (313). The local tradition attributes the building of the church to Pope Simplicius (468-483), who was born at Tivoli. The Liber pontificalis, in the biography of Pope Leo III (795-816), contains the first reference to the "basilica beati martyris Laurentii sita infra civitatem Tyburtinam" ("basilica of the Blessed Martyr Lawrence in the town of Tivoli").

Whatever the exact date, the first church was built over the basilica in the forum of the Roman city of Tibur (1st century BC), whose apse can still be seen behind that of the present building. This church was rebuilt in Romanesque style between the 11th and 12th centuries, and the bell tower belongs to this rebuilding.

The present cathedral, in Baroque style, was built by order of Cardinal Giulio Roma, bishop of Tivoli from 1634 to 1652. It has one nave with side chapels. It was consecrated on February 1, 1641, and completed with the portico in 1650. In 1747 the side door on the north was created, while the inside decoration dates from the early 19th century.

== Description ==
The west front of the church has a portico with three arches, and is flanked by the Romanesque bell tower, about 47 meters high. The interior was decorated by the Roman painter Angelo De Angelis in 1816: on the vault are paintings depicting The Glory of St. Lawrence, Faith and Religion, while in the apse are depicted four saints from Tivoli: Pope Simplicius and the martyrs Generosus, Symphorosa and Getulius. The altarpiece represents St Lawrence in front of the Judge, and was painted by Pietro Labruzzi.

=== Side chapels ===
Four chapels open along the south side of the cathedral:

- Chapel of the Crucifix: decorated by the Tiburtine painter Raffaele Giuliani (19th century) with Scenes of the Passion of Jesus. The altar includes an oil on canvas with Our Lady of Sorrows by Guido Reni or his school
- Chapel of the Immaculate: decorated by Giovanni Francesco Grimaldi. The French sculptor Christophe Veyrier, a nephew and follower of Pierre Puget, is the author of the Immaculate Conception altarpiece
- Chapel of Saint Lawrence: contains paintings by Ludovico Gimignani and Pietro Lucatelli, while the altarpiece, depicting Saint Lawrence, is by Luigi Fontana
- Chapel of the Deposition: contains the famous wooden sculpture group of the Descent from the Cross (c. 1220-1230), which includes six statues: the Christ, the Virgin Mary, Saint John the Evangelist, Joseph of Arimathea, Nicodemus, and an Angel

Two further chapels open on the north side:

- Chapel of the Most Holy Savior: decorated by Vincenzo Manenti. Over the altar is the renowned Triptych of the Savior, a work by the Benedictine monks of Farfa Abbey (first half of the 12th century). The silver cuirass from the triptych, made by Tuscan craftsmen in 1449, is now preserved in a showcase on the left
- Chapel of the Persian Martyrs: decorated by Bartolomeo Colombo, an assistant of the famous painter and architect Pietro da Cortona. This chapel is located in the passage to the side door of the church. On the right is the funerary monument of the Tiburtine bishop Angelo Leonini, who died in 1517

Also on the north side, the sacristy was designed by architect Giovanni Antonio De Rossi (1655–57), and contains frescoes by Giovanni Francesco Grimaldi, and oils on canvas by Innocenzo Tacconi (1575 - after 1625), with The Martyrdom of St Lawrence, and Vincenzo Manenti, with portraits of Cardinals Roma and Santacroce.

== Sources ==
- Maria Grazia Bernardini (ed.), Sei-Settecento a Tivoli. Restauri e ricerche, exhibition catalogue (Tivoli, Villa d'Este, April 5 - August 31, 1997), Roma 1997, pp. 18–36, 46-47, 53-61, 76-81, 84-85, 88-93.
- Franco Sciarretta, Viaggio a Tivoli. Guida della città e del territorio di Tivoli, attraverso 7 percorsi interni e 5 esterni, Tivoli 2001, pp. 64–78.
- Franco Sciarretta, Guide to Tivoli. First Encounter with Tivoli (English edition), Tivoli 2005.
- Camillo Pierattini, La Cattedrale di San Lorenzo a Tivoli, new edition by Francesco Ferruti, Tivoli 2008.
- La Cattedrale di S. Lorenzo in Tivoli, brochure in Italian, French, English, and German, available on site.
