= Madonna and Child Enthroned with Saints Paul and Francis =

Painting by Antoniazzo Romano

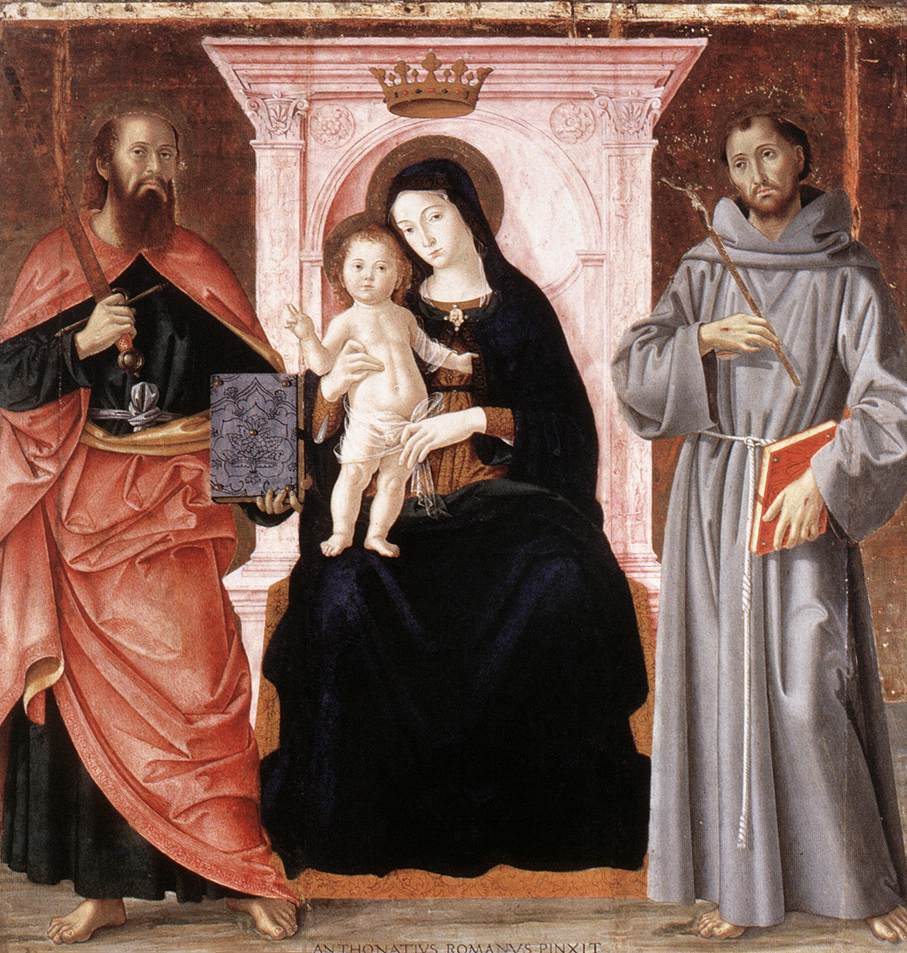
- Artist: Antoniazzo Romano
- Year: 1487
- Medium: Oil on panel
- Dimensions: 166 cm × 165 cm (65 in × 65 in)
- Location: Galleria Nazionale d'Arte Antica, Rome

The Madonna and Child Enthroned with Saints Paul and Francis is a painting by the Italian Renaissance painter Antoniazzo Romano. It was originally the main altarpiece of the church of San Paolo, part of a Franciscan monastery in Poggio Nativo, Lazio. In the 20th century, it was requisitioned and restored at the request of the art historian Adolfo Venturi, and now is housed in the Galleria Nazionale d'Arte Antica of Palazzo Barberini, Rome.

== History ==
Since the 13th century, the monastery of San Paolo had been a Benedictine convent under the rule of the Abbey of Farfa. However, in around 1460 the nuns were removed, and the convent was ceded in 1471 to the Franciscan order, which had a number of monasteries in the area. The friars did not change the dedication of the church, but enlarged and refurbished the decoration. This painting was one of the main works produced in this effort, and until 1898 was the main altarpiece for the church.

In his 1872 guide to monuments in the province of Umbria, Mariano Guardabassi takes note of this altarpiece signed Anthonatius Romanus pinxit and dated 1487 in the lower register. Some two decades later, it was discovered by the art historian Diego Angeli under a pile of garbage in the convent of San Paolo. By 1898, Adolfo Venturi had the Sovrintendenza alle Bella Arti requisition the work for restoration and display.

== Description ==
The painting follows a typical arrangement. The Virgin sits on a decorative cloth laid on a pink stone throne, decorated with garlands and flower motif. The pale Virgin wears a dark cloak over her brown dress; above her head is suspended a crown. She holds the Christ child, who stands on her knee, blessing the onlooker with two fingers. Alongside and in front of Virgin stand the two saints: Paul with a sword on her right, and the stigmatized Francis with his long crucifix on her left. The grouping of these two saints is not common. Saint Paul, dressed in finery, militantly holds his gospel almost like a shield, and gazes forward sternly. Saint Francis, in his simple garb, gingerly holds his gospel close, gazing upward meditatively.
