= Vincenzo Manenti =

Italian painter

Vincenzo Manenti (also known as Vincenzio Manenti) (c. 1600–1674) was an Italian painter of the Baroque period.

He was born, worked and died in Canemorto (now Orvinio) in the region of Sabina and province of Rieti where he had been first a pupil of his father, Ascanio Manenti, but then apprenticed with Giuseppe Cesari and Domenichino. He painted several works, among them some frescoes and the portraits of cardinals Giulio Roma and Marcello Santacroce, for Tivoli Cathedral and a St. Xavier in the Jesuits' church, which no longer exists. He also frescoed the church of Santa Maria dei Raccomandati, Orvinio. His paintings in the church of Santa Maria Nova, Toffia were destroyed by a fire.
