= San Paolo, Poggio Nativo =

Roman Catholic church and former monastery in Lazio, Italy

San Paolo is a Roman Catholic church and former monastery in the town of Poggio Nativo, province of Rieti, Region of Lazio, Italy.

== History ==
Putatively built at the site of former Roman structures, the monastery construction was begun in 1261 under the patronage of the Abbey of Farfa, according to a portal inscription. It housed nuns under the Benedictine rule . The first documentation of this abbey is from the 1322 Codice Barberiniano Latino. The nuns remained in the convent until 1460, when they were moved to another monastery. Uninhabited for ten years, it nearly fell to ruin. Pope Paul II ceded in 1471 the convent to the Franciscans, who enlarged the church and convent, building an adjacent hospital/hotel for the indigent. In the process, it is recalled, that they uncovered a number of Ancient Roman burials and objects. They found coins with the images of Vespasian, Galba, and Caracalla. The monastery underwent suppression and reorganization in the 19th century. The convent was finally emptied ten years after the world war by Pope Pius II.

== Decoration ==
Much of the interior decoration including the wooden choir and some of the church frescoes were added under the Franciscan rule. They built a library that received the collections of the priest Francesco Antonio da Collelungo. The cloister has lunettes painted with the life of St Francis.

Until the late 19th-century, the main altarpiece was the Enthroned Madonna and Child with Saints Paul and Francis by Antoniazzo Romano, discovered by Adolfo Venturi, and now on display in the Galleria Nazionale d'Arte Antica at the Palazzo Barberini in Rome. The main altar is replaced by two smaller canvases, with the upper one attributed to Antoniazo, depicting a Virgin and Child.

Antoniazzo also painted for this church an Enthroned Madonna on a rose marble throne with child Jesus at her feet blessing, St Paul on left and St Francis on right on a gilded background. In the choir is a Conversion of St Paul by a local artist and a Deposition, Nativity and St Antony of Padua . The chapels were previously owned by prominent noble families in the town.
