= Elio Sgreccia =

Italian bioethicist and Catholic cardinal (1928–2019)

His Eminence Elio Sgreccia
- Cardinal-Deacon of Sant'Angelo in Pescheria
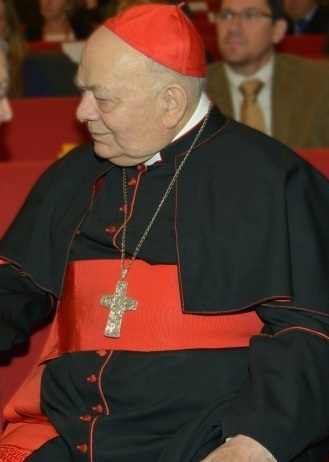
- Appointed: 20 November 2010
- Predecessor: Augusto Álvaro da Silva
- Successor: Luis Pascual Dri
- Other post: President Emeritus of the Pontifical Academy for Life
- Previous posts: Titular Bishop of Zama Minor (1993–2010); Secretary of the Pontifical Council for the Family (1992–1996); Vice President of the Pontifical Academy for Life (1994–2005); President of the Pontifical Academy for Life (2005–2008)

Orders
- Ordination: 29 June 1952 by Vincenzo Del Signore
- Consecration: 6 January 1993 by Pope John Paul II
- Created cardinal: 20 November 2010 by Benedict XVI
- Rank: Cardinal-Deacon

Personal details
- Born: 6 June 1928 Arcevia, Italy
- Died: 5 June 2019 (aged 90) Rome, Italy
- Denomination: Roman Catholic
- Coat of arms

Styles of Elio Sgreccia
- Reference style: His Eminence
- Spoken style: Your Eminence
- Informal style: Cardinal
- See: none

Elio Sgreccia (Italian pronunciation: [ˈɛːljo ˈzɡrettʃa]; 6 June 1928 – 5 June 2019) was an Italian bioethicist and a cardinal of the Catholic Church. He was president of the Pontifical Academy for Life, director of the international medical ethics journal Medicina e Morale, president of the Ut Vitam Habeant Foundation and the Donum Vitae Association of the Diocese of Rome, and honorary president of the International Federation of Bioethics Centers and Institutes of Personalist Inspiration (FIBIP).

== Early life ==
Sgreccia was the youngest of six children born to an agricultural family. He was born and raised in Nidastore, a small town in the Comune of Arcevia in the Province of Ancona in the Marche region located in central-eastern Italy. His entry into the seminary was delayed by the start of World War II, so he continued to assist his family in the fields and attended a vocational school in the meantime.

== Church life ==
Sgreccia entered the seminary in Fano and was ordained a priest on the Feast of Saints Peter and Paul: 29 June 1952. Sgreccia first served as a spiritual minister to the youth of Catholic Action. He completed university degrees in classical letters, philosophy, and theology, and worked as a professor, vice rector, and rector at Pius XI Pontifical Regional Seminary in Fano until 1972, when he became vicar general of the Diocese of Fossombrone.

On 5 November 1992, Pope John Paul II appointed him Titular Bishop of Zama Minor and secretary of the Pontifical Council for the Family, where he served until his resignation in April 1996. He was consecrated as a bishop on 6 January 1993 by Pope John Paul II. In 2004, he became president of the Ut Vitam Habeant Foundation and the Donum Vitae Association of the Diocese of Rome. In one of his last appointments, Pope John Paul II named him president of the Pontifical Academy for Life on 3 January 2005, a post he held until his age-induced resignation was accepted on 17 June 2008. He was one of four prelates over the age of 80, known for their distinguished contributions to Catholicism, whom Pope Benedict XVI elevated to the rank of cardinal in the consistory on 20 November 2010. Sgreccia was made cardinal deacon of Sant'Angelo in Pescheria and was installed on 12 March 2011.

== Bioethics ==
From 1974 to 1984 Sgreccia served as a spiritual minister at the Faculty of Medicine and Surgery of the Catholic University of the Sacred Heart in Rome, where he was involved with the spiritual formation of health care professionals and the investigation of biomedical moral issues. In 1984 he became a bioethics instructor at the same university. In 1985 he founded the university's Bioethics Center, with a focus on clinical ethics, and served as director until 2006. In the 1980s he was an observer for the Holy See on the Ad Hoc Committee of Experts on Bioethics (CAHBI) of the Council of Europe. In 1990 he became a full professor at the university and joined Italy's Comitato Nazionale per la Bioetica (National Bioethics Committee), where he contributed to its many expert opinions until 2006. In 1992 he was appointed director of the university's Institute of Bioethics, with a focus on research, and served until 2000. His work at the Bioethics Center and the Institute of Bioethics at the Catholic University of the Sacred Heart entailed close involvement with the Agostino Gemelli Polyclinic, the university's teaching hospital. Sgreccia became a member of the Committee for Guidelines on Genetic Counseling and Testing of Italy's Ministry of Health in 2001. In 2003, he founded the International Federation of Bioethics Centers and Institutions of Personalist Inspiration (Federazione Internazionale dei centri ed istituti di Bioetica di Ispirazione Personalista, FIBIP).

Sgreccia authored Manuale di bioetica ('Manual of bioethics'), presenting a reason-based philosophical approach to bioethics that dovetails with the natural law and the moral teachings of the Catholic Church. He referred to his approach as "ontologically grounded personalism", which applies a three-point or "triangular" method of scientific data, philosophical anthropology and reason-based claims of moral obligation for action in order to make ethical judgments. It was first published by Vita e Pensiero in 1986 with the title Bioetica. Manuale per medici e biologi (Bioethics: A manual for physicians and biologists). Its first edition under the definitive title Manuale di bioetica was published in two volumes in 1988. The fourth Italian edition was published in 2007. It has been reprinted numerous times and has been published in whole or in part in roughly ten different languages, including Spanish, French, and Russian. The first complete English edition of Volume I was published by The National Catholic Bioethics Center in 2012 as Personalist Bioethics: Foundations and Applications.

On 25 March 2011, Sgreccia received an honorary doctorate from the Pontifical Athenaeum Regina Apostolorum in Rome, whose faculty of bioethics was the first in higher education to offer a complete degree program in bioethics: bachelor, licentiate (master) and doctorate.

== Death ==
Sgreccia died on 5 June 2019 in his home in Rome, aged 90. His funeral was held on 7 June 2019 in St. Peter's Basilica and was presided over by Cardinal Giovanni Battista Re, Vice-Dean of the College of Cardinals. Pope Francis also led the rite of final commendation and farewell.

== Publications ==
Sgreccia published some 400 works in Italian and various other languages. Some of his works include:

- Sgreccia, Elio. Personalist Bioethics: Foundations and Applications. Philadelphia: The National Catholic Bioethics Center, 2012. ISBN 9780935372632. Original Italian: Manuale di bioetica. Fondamenti ed etica biomedica. 4th ed. Milan: Vita e Pensiero, 2007. ISBN 9788834312902.
- Sgreccia, Elio and Jean Laffitte. The Human Embryo before Implantation: Scientific Aspects and Bioethical Considerations. Rome: Libreria Editrice Vaticana, 2009. ISBN 9788820978785.
- Sgreccia, Elio and M. Luisa Di Pietro. Procreazione assistita e fecondazione artificiale tra scienza, bioetica e diritto. Brescia: La Scuola, 1999.
- Sgreccia, Elio. La bioetica nel quotidiano. Milan: Vita e Pensiero, 2006. ISBN 9788834313459.
- Sgreccia, Elio, Angelo Serra, and M. Luisa Di Pietro. Nuova genetica ed embriopoiesi umana. Prospettive della scienza e riflessioni etiche. Milan: Vita e Pensiero, 1990. ISBN 9788834314593.
- Sgreccia, Elio and M. Luisa Di Pietro. La trasmissione della vita nell'insegnamento di Giovanni Paolo II. Milan: Vita e Pensiero, 1989. ISBN 9788834314562.
