= Giovanni Antonio de' Rossi =

Italian architect (1616–1695)

Giovanni Antonio de' Rossi (1616–1695) was an Italian architect of the Baroque period, active mainly in Rome.

== Life ==
He was a contemporary of Carlo Rainaldi. In 1657, he completed the sacristy of Tivoli Cathedral. That same year, he designed the renovations to Chiesa di San Rocco all'Augusteo, adding a dome, the sacristy and a new chapel. He created the shrine over the high altar, designed by Rainaldi, in Santa Maria in Campitelli to house the icon of Santa Maria in Portico.

At about the time he became the architect of the Monte di Pietà in Rome until his death and built its oval chapel from the 1650s onwards.

For Pope Clement X he carried out an extensive and hurried refurbishment (1670–76) of the family's Palazzo Altieri near the Church of Il Gesù.

He erected the church of Santa Maria in Campo Marzio in 1682-1685 and was involved in the design of the Cappella Lancellotti in St John Lateran.

His Palazzo D'Aste-Bonaparte on Piazza Venezia influenced the later designs of Alessandro Specchi's Palazzo de Carolis and Tommaso de Marchis' Palazzo Millini-Cagiati.
