= Santa Maria Nova, Toffia =

Roman Catholic Church in Toffia, Italy

Coordinates: 42.2119°N 12.7501°E

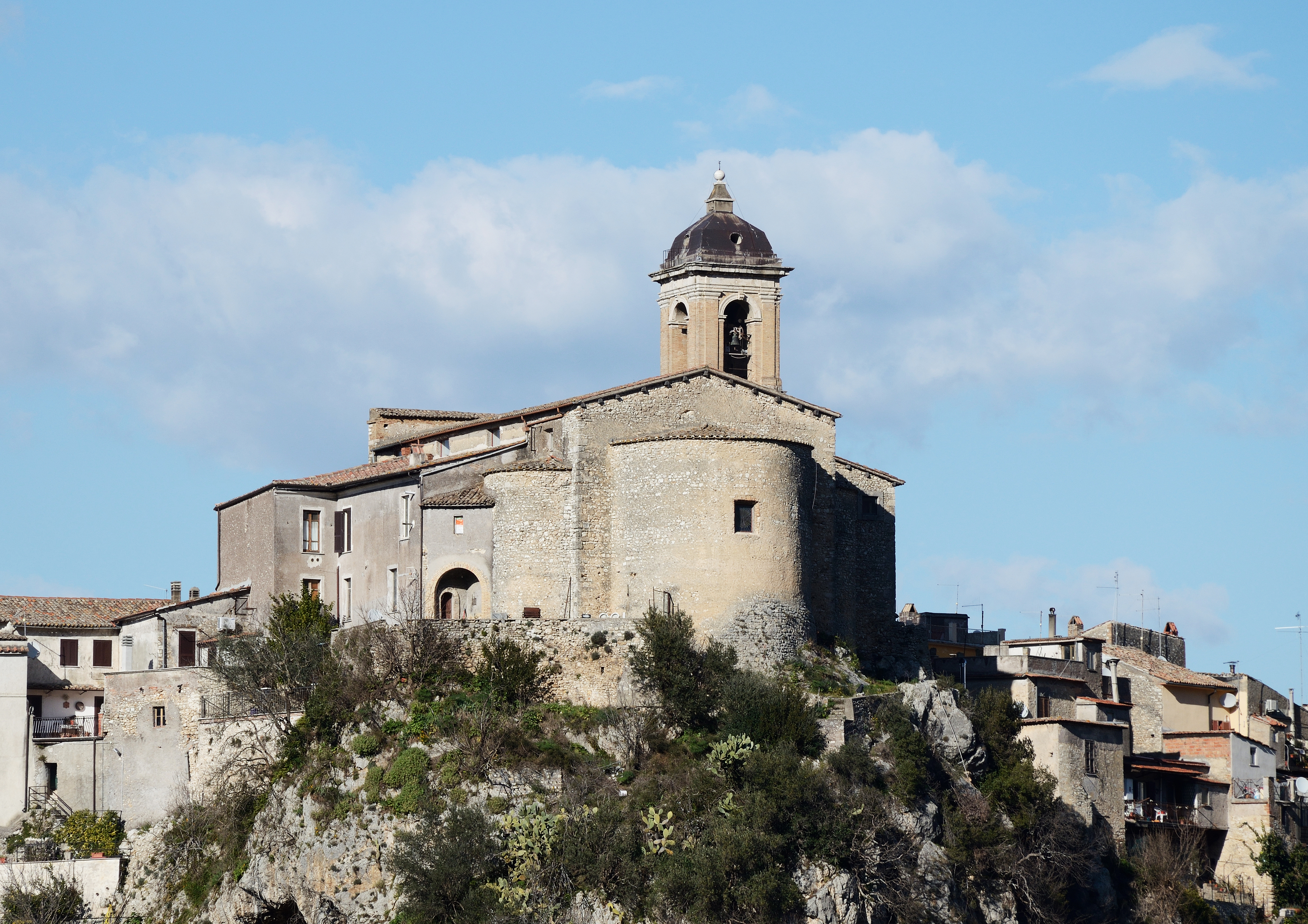
View of the Exterior Apse of the church of Santa Maria Nova

Santa Maria Nova, also called, Chiesa della Visitazione is a Renaissance-style, Roman Catholic church located in the center of the town of Toffia, province of Rieti, region of Lazio, central Italy. It is scenically located in the highest point in the town.

== History ==
It appears the church was built from the ruins of an older medieval building. Some attribute its founding earlier to Lombards, and that the present building replaced an older church. Documents show construction of the present structure bean on 2 July 1507, with plans to dedicate the church to the Visitation of the Virgin to St Elizabeth. The church was severely damaged by a fire on 31 December 1981, that consumed the frescoes and the altarpiece of the Visitation by Vincenzo Manenti (1600-1674), the wooden choir stalls from the early 17th-century, the 18th-century organ, and more. The church was rebuilt and reconsecrated in November 1995.

The main altarpiece is now a contemporary work by Massimo Livadiotti. A chapel has an altarpiece depicting St Stephen before the Holy Family attributed to Vincenzo Manenti.
