= San Rocco, Rome =

Church building in Rome

The Church of Saint Roch
- San Rocco alla Augusteo
- La Chiesa di San Rocco di Roma
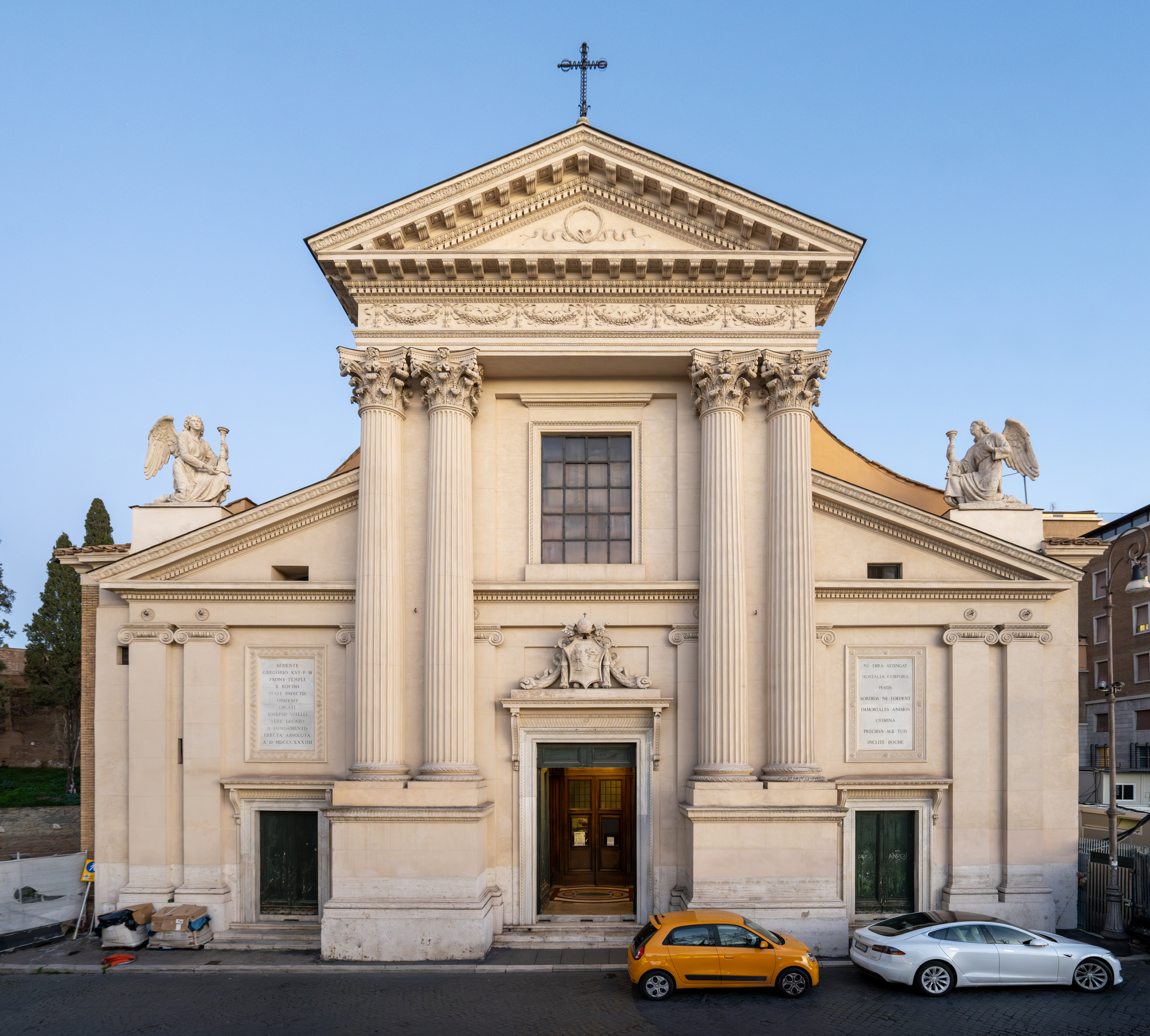
- Facade
- Click on the map for a fullscreen view
- 41°54′19.65″N 12°28′33.24″E
- Location: Rome
- Country: Italy
- Denomination: Roman Catholic

History
- Dedication: Saint Roch

Architecture
- Architect(s): Giovan Antonio de' Rossi, Giuseppe Valadier
- Architectural type: Church
- Style: Baroque
- Groundbreaking: 1499
- Completed: 1832 (façade)

La Chiesa di San Rocco (English: The Church of Saint Roch) is a Roman Catholic building that is part of the Parish of Saint Giacomo. The original conjoined building dates m99 and is located at 1 Largo San Rocco, Rome.

The shrine is dedicated to Saint Roch with his preserved relics and was built next to the Mausoleum of Augustus. Known for its ornate interior, the shrine has merited various patronages by several Popes. The current shrine is maintained and administered by the Confraternity of Saint Roch.

== History ==
Pope Alexander VI issued a Pontifical decree Cogitantes Humanæ Conditionis on 11 June 1499 which gave to the Confraternity of the Osti and Barcaroli (innkeepers and boatmen), based at Ripetta, the small old church of San Martino de Pila and permission to build a hospital on a plot of land close to the Mausoleum of Augustus. The church was called San Rocco e Martino. The Church of San Martino was destroyed in the sixteenth century and some of its furnishings transferred to the new San Rocco.

A hospital for plague sufferers was soon constructed and dedicated to their patron, Saint Roch. Initially male only, a maternity wing for women from the Tiber barges was later added to the hospital and, over time, San Rocco Hospital as a whole came to be used principally by unmarried mothers. The hospital was closed at the start of the 20th century and in the 1930s it was demolished for excavations on the Mausoleum, as was the church's bell tower.

In 1527, a forty—two feet, ancient Roman obelisk was discovered on the site of San Rocco. It was later removed to the area of Santa Maria Maggiore, as it was hampering cart traffic around the port.

In 1811, Giuseppe del Medico, professor of surgery and lecturer at the Accademia di San Luca published Anatomia per uso dei pittori e scultori. He is buried at San Rocco.

== Confraternity of the Cord of Saint Joseph ==
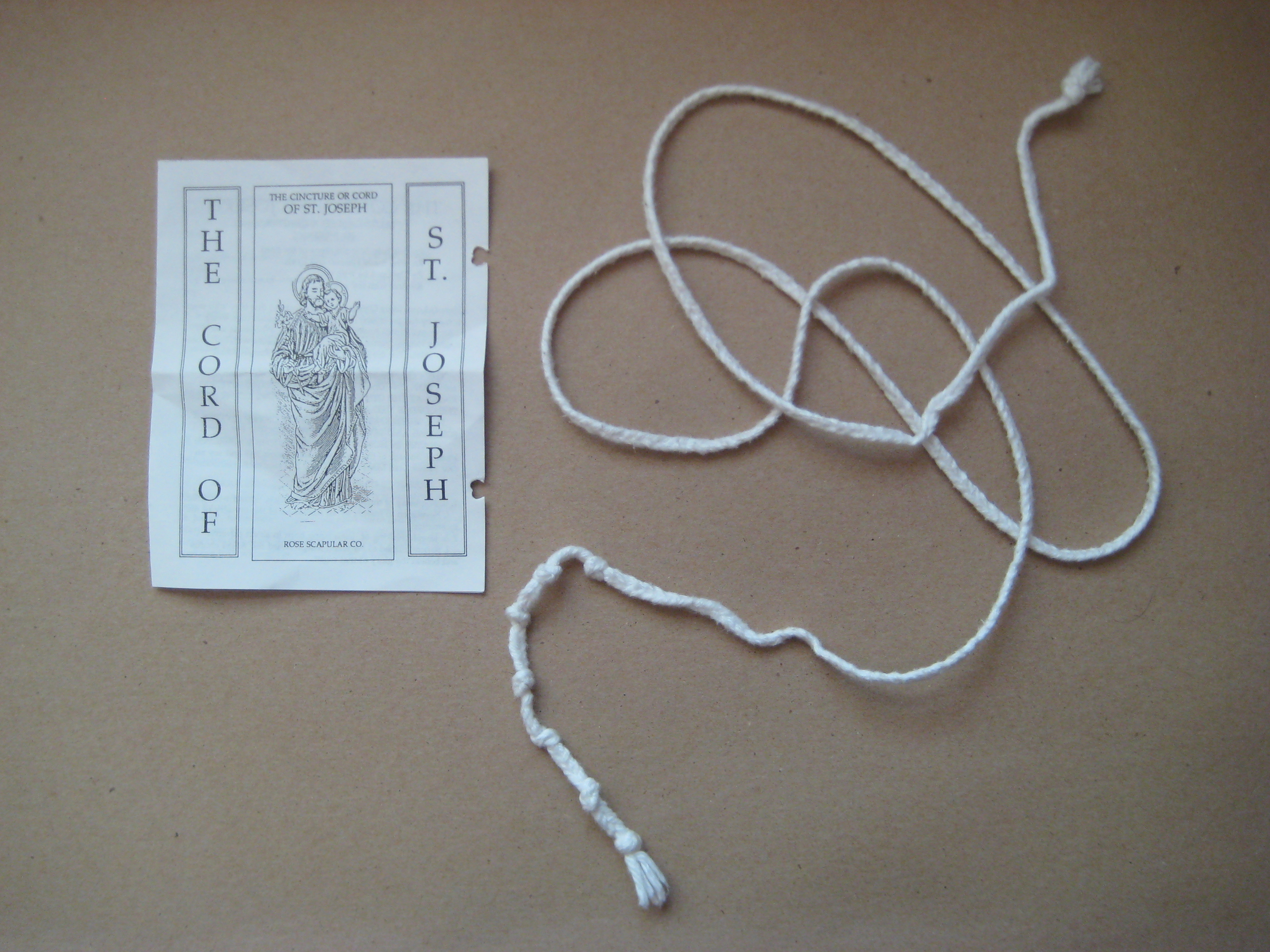
Cord of Saint Joseph with explanatory pamphlet

The Archconfraternity of the Cord of Saint Joseph was based at the Church of San Rocco.

The cure of an Augustinian nun at Antwerp in 1657 from a grievous illness, through the wearing of a cord in honour of Saint Joseph, gave rise to the pious practice of wearing it to obtain the grace of purity through his intercession. The devotion soon spread over many countries of Europe, and in the 19th century was revived at Rome in the Church of Saint Roch and in that of Saint Nicolas at Verona, Italy. Pope Pius IX, in a rescript dated 19 September 1859, approved a special formula for the blessing of the cord of Saint Joseph.

The brief Universi Dominici gregis of 23 September 1862, raised the Confraternity of the Cord of Saint Joseph was to an archconfraternity.

The cord is white, in token of St. Joseph's purity of heart, and has seven knots, denoting his seven joys and sorrows. Members are encouraged to recite daily seven Glorias in honour of St. Joseph. The White Cord of Saint Joseph can be worn around the waist for purity or around the shoulders for obedience. Any priest can bless the girdle, after which when worn for the first time, enrolls one in the Archconfraternity of the Cord of Saint Joseph; the formula "Priest's Blessing of a Cincture" found in the Roman Ritual can be used for this.

Confraternities of the Cord of Saint Joseph must be aggregated to the archconfraternity in the Church of St. Roch at Rome in order to enjoy its spiritual favours and indulgences.

== Roman architecture ==
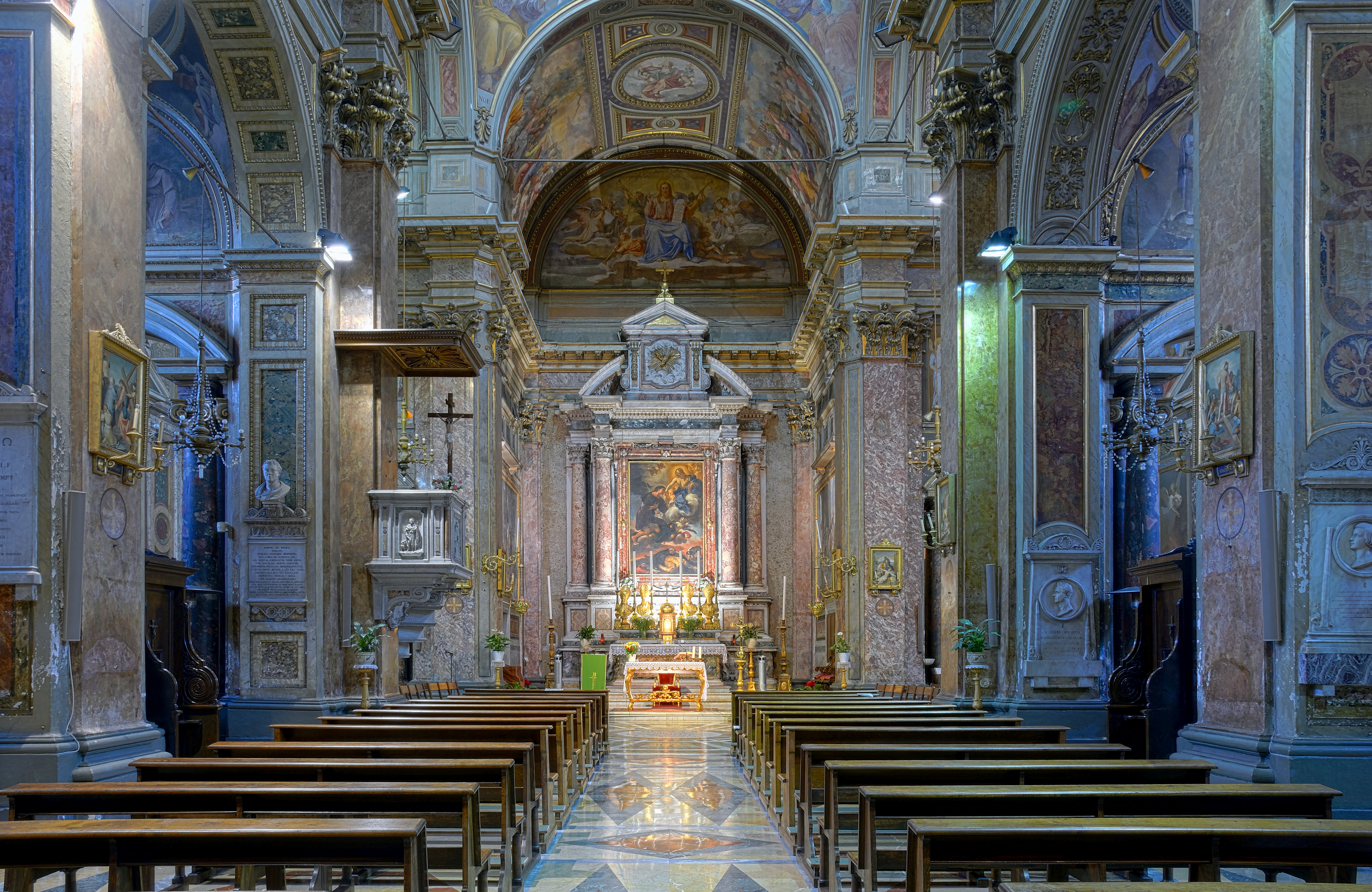
Interior of the shrine.

The new Church of San Rocco was constructed around 1509. Built as the chapel of the adjacent hospital, it was rebuilt in 1657 to a design by Giovan Antonio de' Rossi. He added a small dome, the sacristy and the new chapel of the "Madonna delle Grazie". Later changes were made introducing the Neo-Classical style to it. A new, Palladio-influenced façade by Giuseppe Valadier was built in 1834, inspired by Andrea Palladio's work on Church of San Giorgio Maggiore, Venice. The coat of arms of Pope Gregory XVI is over the main entrance. Two “Angels holding candles” were added to the façade in 1984.

=== Interior ===
The sermon pulpit was gifted by Pope Benedict XV. The main altarpiece over the main altar is The Apotheosis of St Roch (1674) by Giacinto Brandi. The fresco of St Martin Sharing His Cloak with a Beggar (1885) is by Cesare Mariani. The church has relics of Saint Roch in a silver reliquary.

Baldassare Peruzzi's fresco of Our Lady, St Roch and St Anthony the Abbot was extensively restored by Giovanni Battista Gaulli. Peruzzi was an officer of the Confraternity. Other frescoes by Peruzzi were destroyed by floods.

There are three chapels on each side:

- Chapel of Our Lady of Lourdes
- Chapel of the Nativity (The fresco altarpiece is by Baldassarre Peruzzi.)
- Chapel of Saint Anthony of Padua
- Chapel of the Blessed Virgin Mary of the Immaculate Conception
- Chapel of Saint Joseph the Patriarch
- Chapel of Saint Francis of Paola

Giacinto Brandi painted San Rocco intercede per i malati di peste (1673). The carved organ case and cantoria over the entrance doorway dates from the first half of the 18th century. The interior was restored again in 1885.

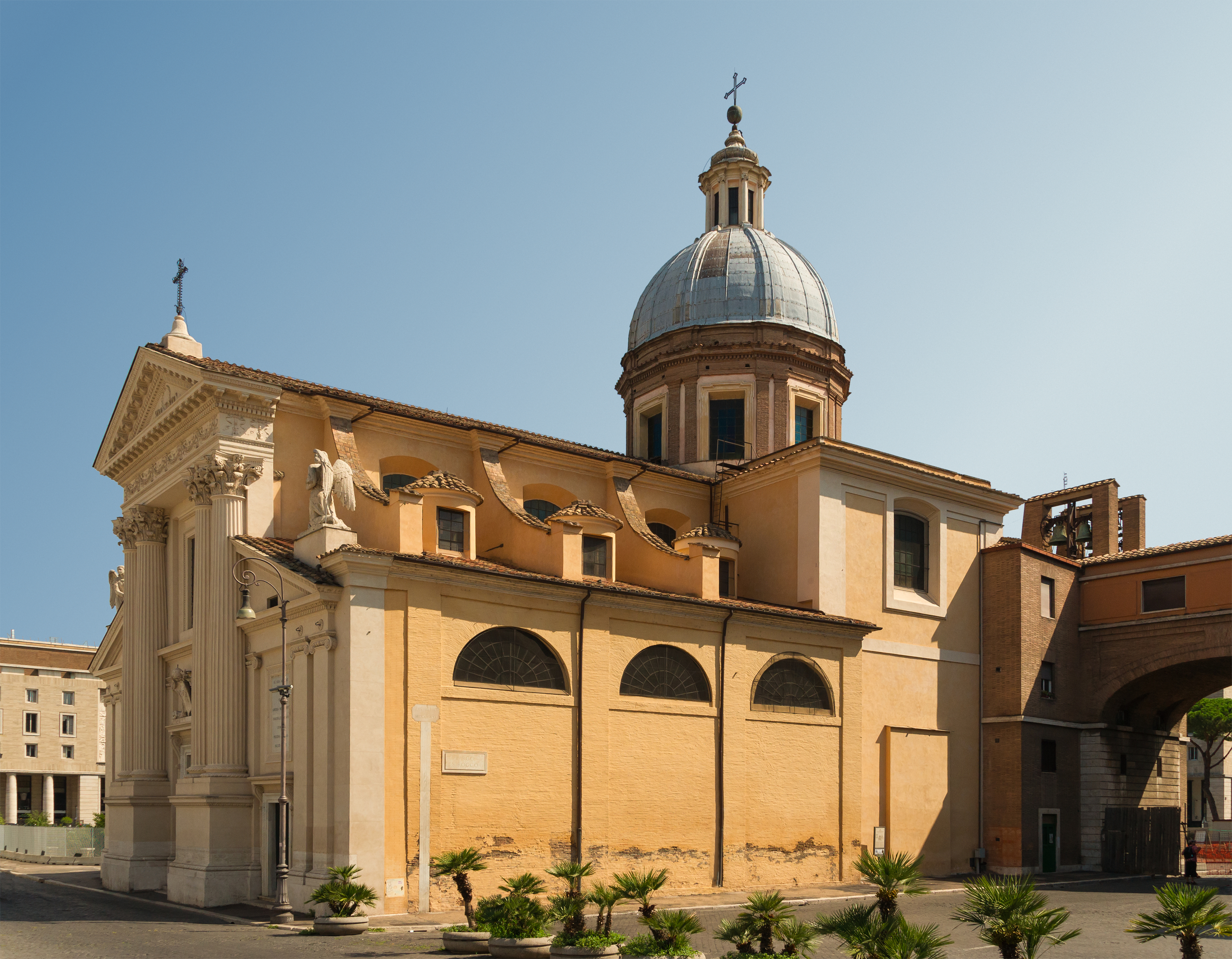
Church of San Rocco

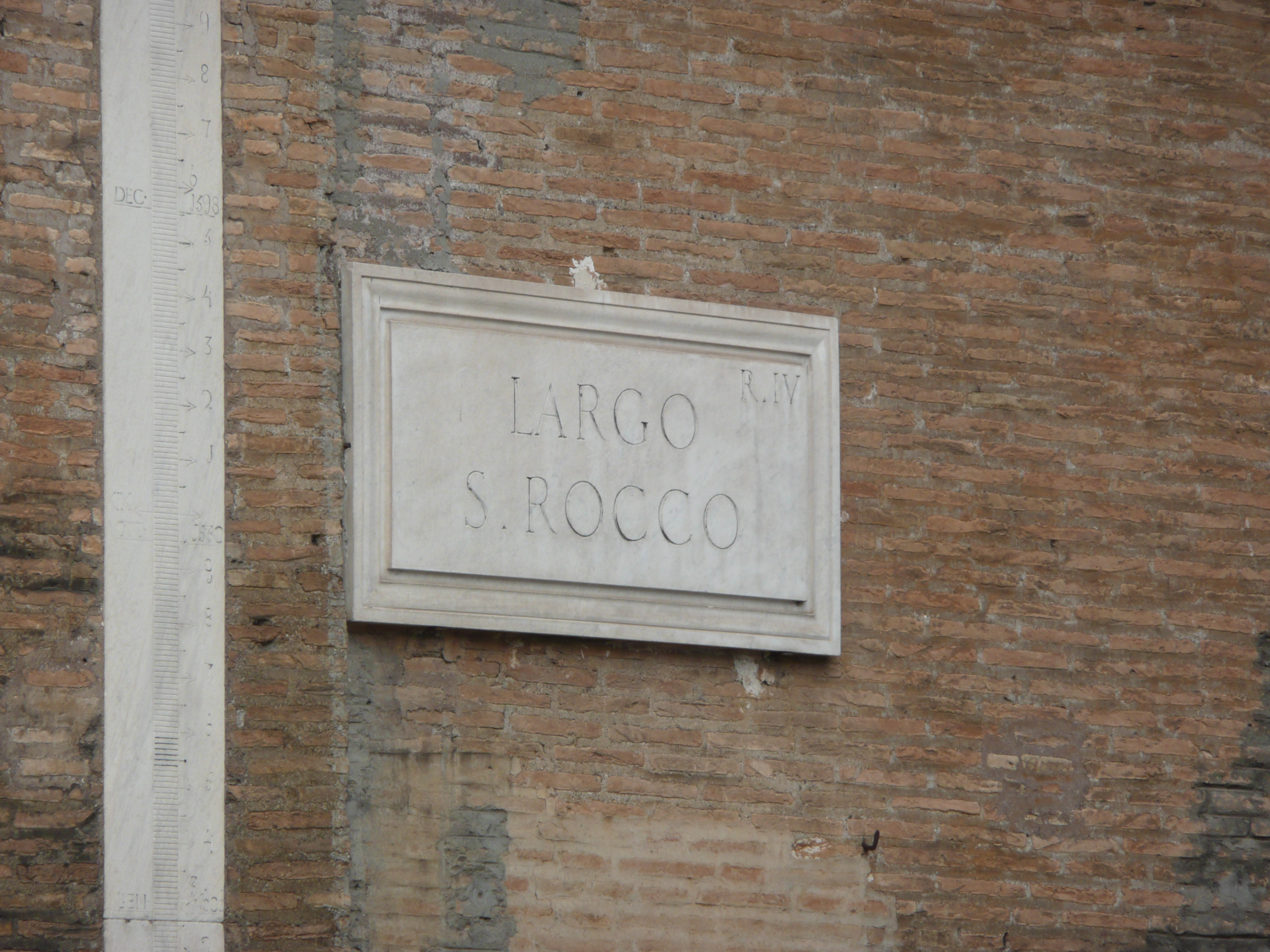
Address sign; Largo S. Rocco; the photo also includes part of an old hydrometer

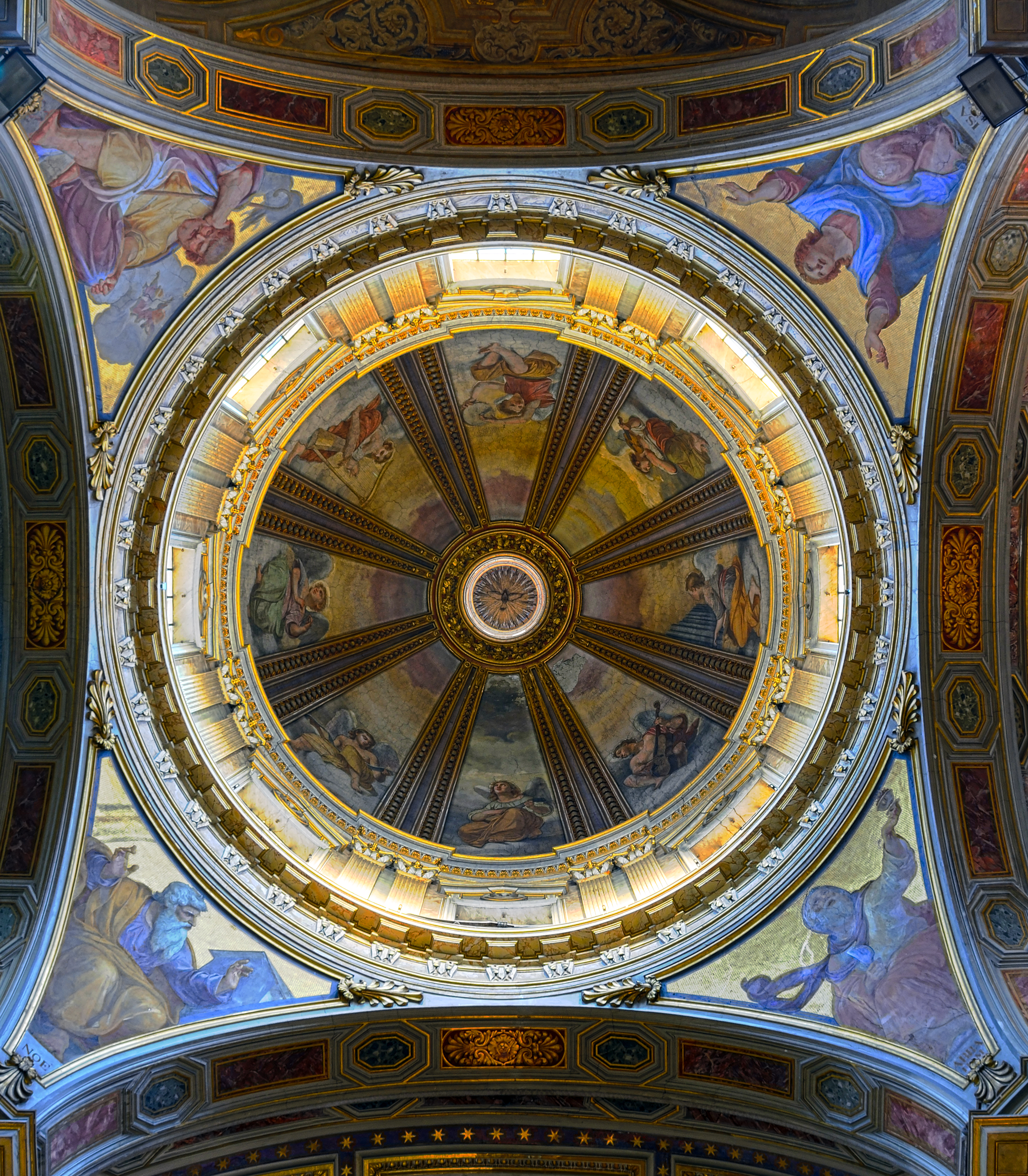
The Dome

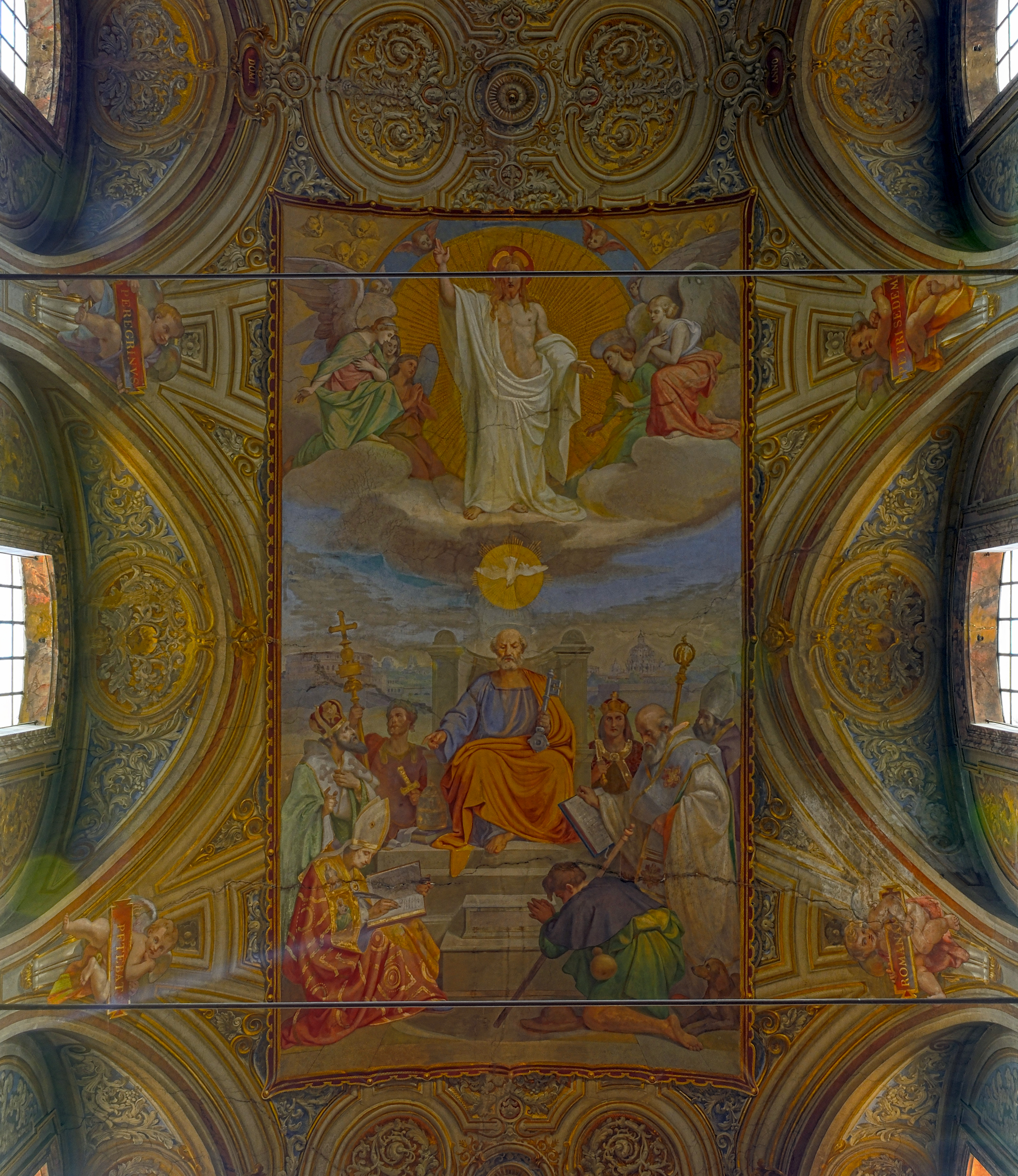
The ceiling
