= Toffia =

- Comune
- Comune di Toffia
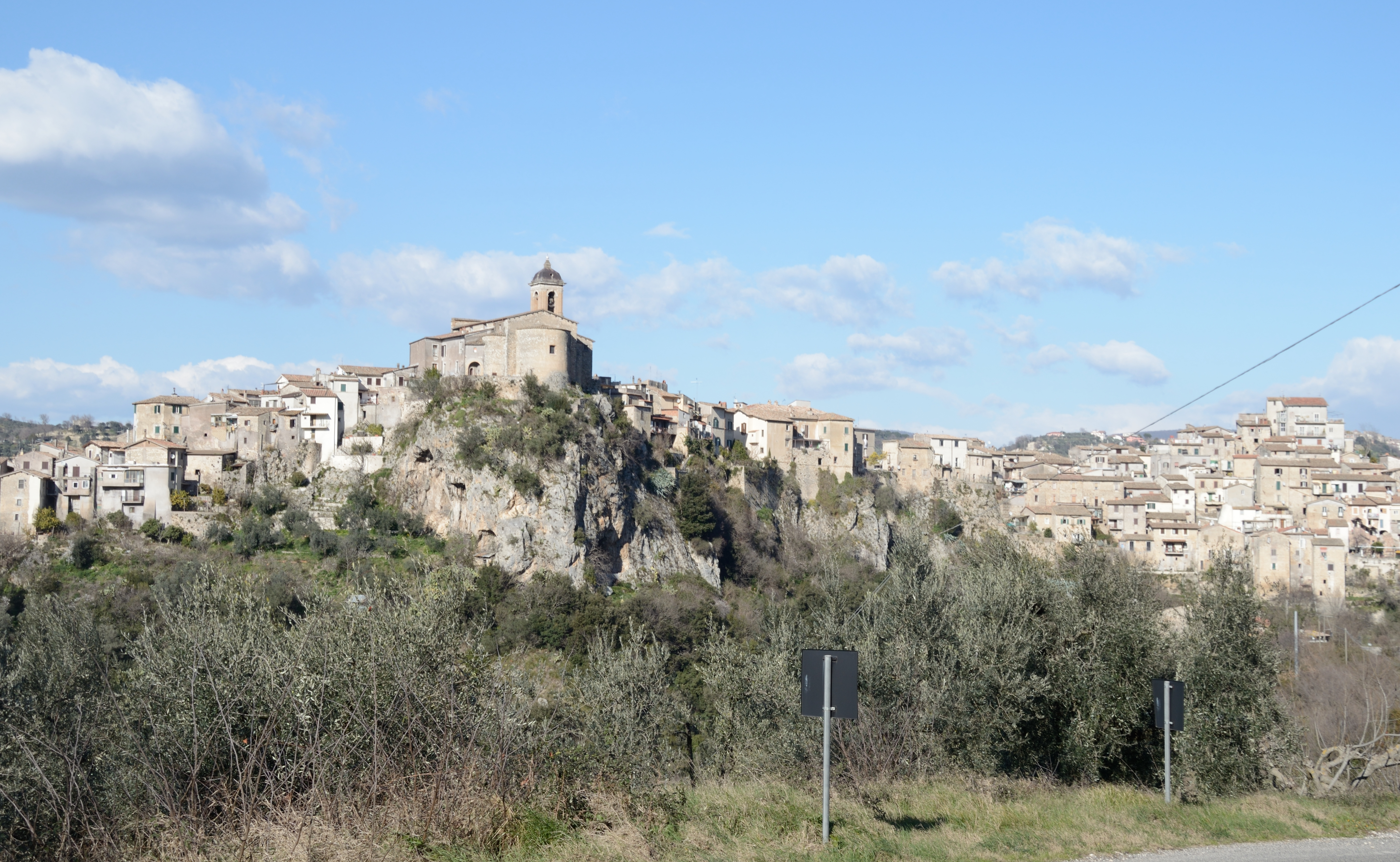
- View of Toffia

- Location within Italy Location within Lazio
- Coordinates: 42°12′45″N 12°45′12″E
- Country: Italy
- Region: Lazio
- Province: Rieti (RI)

Government
  - Mayor: Emiliano Oliveti

Area
  - Total: 11.33 km^{2} (4.37 sq mi)
- Elevation: 262 m (860 ft)

Population (31 December 2010)
  - Total: 1,002
  - Density: 88.44/km^{2} (229.1/sq mi)
- Demonym: Toffiesi
- Time zone: UTC+1 (CET)
  - Summer (DST): UTC+2 (CEST)
- Postal code: 02039
- Dialing code: 0765
- Patron saint: St. Lawrence
- Saint day: 10 August
- Website: Official website

Toffia is a comune (municipality) in the Province of Rieti in the Italian region of Latium, located about 40 kilometres (25 mi) northeast of Rome and about 25 kilometres (16 mi) southwest of Rieti.

Toffia borders the following municipalities: Castelnuovo di Farfa, Fara in Sabina, Nerola, Poggio Nativo.

The church of Santa Maria Nova stands on the hill above the town.
