= Sant'Angelo in Pescheria =

- Sant'Angelo in Piscaria
- Chiesa di Sant'Angelo in Pescheria
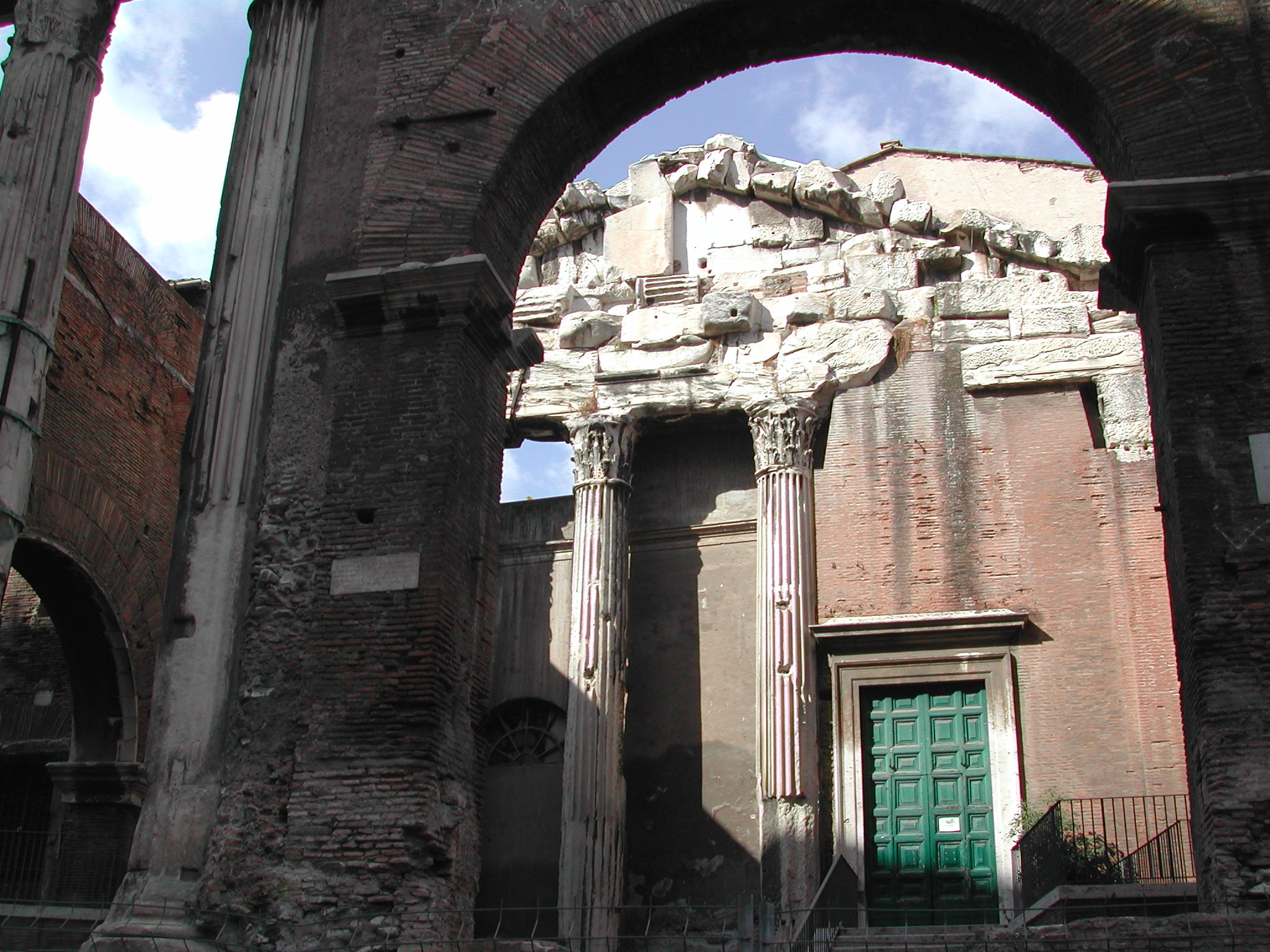
- Facade
- Click on the map for a fullscreen view
- 41.8927°N 12.4787°E
- Location: Via della Tribuna di Campitelli 6, Rome
- Country: Italy
- Denomination: Roman Catholic
- Tradition: Latin Rite
- Religious institute: Caracciolini

History
- Status: General Curia of the Clerics Regular Minor
- Dedication: Holy Angels

Architecture
- Style: Pre-Romanesque
- Groundbreaking: 8th century AD

Administration
- Diocese: Rome

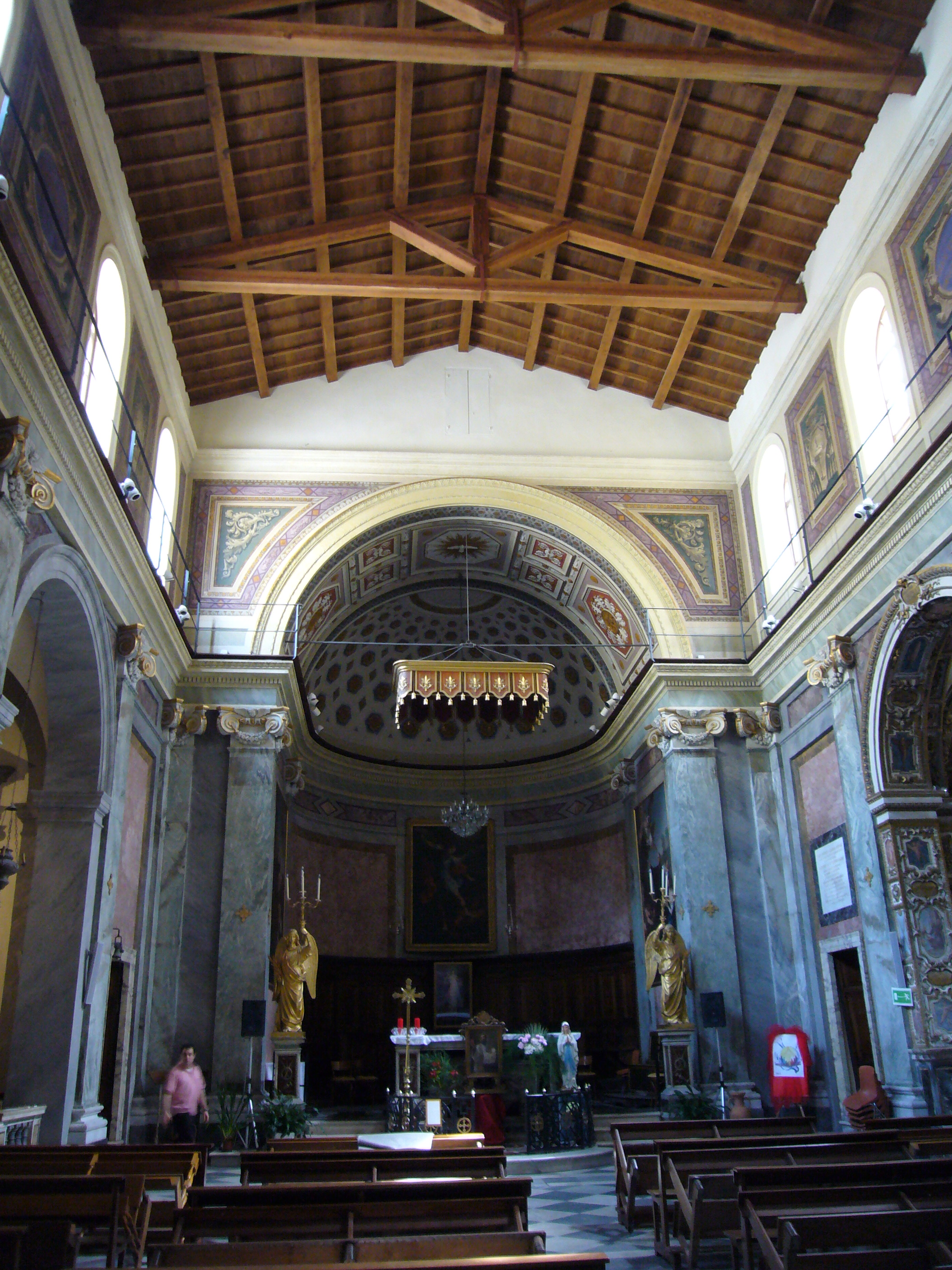
Interior

Sant'Angelo in Pescheria or in Piscaria is a church in Rome. Dating from the 8th century, it is now used as the conventual church of the General Curia of the Clerics Regular Minor, the order's global headquarters. "In Pescheria" refers to its location close to the fish market built in the ruins of the ancient Porticus Octaviae.

== History ==
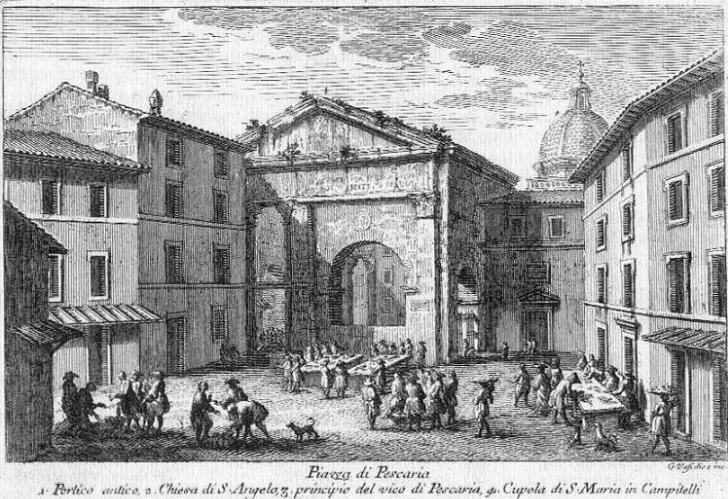
1752 illustration

The relics of St. Symphorosa and her seven sons were transferred to the Church of Sant'Angelo in Pescheria at Rome by Pope Stephen II in 752. A sarcophagus was found here in 1610, bearing the inscription: Hic requiescunt corpora SS. Martyrum Simforosae, viri sui Zotici (Getulii) et Filiorum ejus a Stephano Papa translata. This inscription refers to Saint Getulius and Saint Symphorosa, purported to be husband and wife, who had seven sons, who were also martyred. The remains of these saints were transferred to Sant'Angelo by Pope Stephen II in 752.

The revolutionary "tribune" Cola di Rienzo was born near Sant'Angelo. He launched his effort to seize control of Rome from the vicinity of the church in 1347.

The Roman Ghetto was established nearby in the rione Sant'Angelo in 1555 by order of Pope Paul IV. The Ghetto was abolished in 1870 after the reunification of Italy or Risorgimento, and the Ghetto wall was demolished in 1888. The rione Sant'Angelo, numbered as XI, is named after the church.

The inscriptions found in S. Angelo, a valuable source illustrating the history of the Basilica, have been collected and published by Vincenzo Forcella.

In the second chapel to the left inside the church are frescoes of the Madonna with Child and Angels attributed to Benozzo Gozzoli (c. 1450). During the late 14th century, Matteo de Baccari dedicated part of his inheritance to the Church of Sant'Angelo in Pescheria in Rome, specifically to the Chapel of St. Cosmo and Damian. The chapel was not operational, but after many years his daughter, Mattea, managed to make the chapel functional.

The Church is currently in the possession of the Order of Clerics Regular Minor, which utilizes the attached convent as their Generalate House.

== Cardinal-Deacons ==
=== 1116–1599 ===
- Gregorio Papareschi (1116–1130), later Pope Innocent II
- Gregorio Papareschi junior (1134–1141)
- Gregorio (1143–1155)
- Bonadies de Bonadie (1155–1158)
- Giovanni da Napoli (?) (1159?–1180?)
- Ermanno (1165–1170)
- Ugo Pierleoni (1171–1178)
- Giovanni (1178–1181 or 1182)
- Andrea Bobone (1182–1187)
- Boson d'Arles (1187–1188)
- Gregorius (1190–1202)
- Pietro de Morra (1205 – 6 May 1206)
- Romano Bonaventura (1216–1234)
- Riccardo Annibaldi, OSB (1239–1276)
- Landolfo Brancaccio (18 September 1294 Appointed – died 29 October 1312)
- Pietro Colonna (died 1326)
- Giovanni Colonna (1327–1348) Archpriest of the Lateran Basilica
- Guillaume Noellet (1371–1394)
- Pietro Blavi (1395 – 12 December 1409)
- Pedro Fonseca (1412–1422)
- Giuliano Cesarini (24 May 1426 – 1444) Appointed Bishop of Tusculum
- Juan Carvajal (16 December 1446 – 26 October 1461) Appointed Bishop of Porto
- Giovanni de Michaelis (Michiel) (ca. 1470 – ca. 1484)
- Giuliano Cesarini (12 June 1503 – 1 May 1510)
- Federigo de San Severino (1513–1514?)
- Matthias Lang de Wellenburg (1514 – 26 February 1535) Appointed Bishop of Albano
- Alessandro Farnese (1535)
- Ennio Filonardi (15 January 1537 – 8 October 1546) Appointed Bishop of Albano
- Ranuccio Farnese (8 October 1546 – 7 February 1565) Appointed Bishop of Sabina
- Fulvio Giulio della Corgna (Corneus) (7 February 1565 – 30 January 1566)
- Giovanni Ricci (30 January 1566 – 7 October 1566)
- Scipione Rebiba (7 October 1566 – 3 July 1570)
- Giovanni Antonio Serbelloni (3 July 1570 – 31 July 1577) [The Deaconry was temporarily a titulus]
- Ludovico d'Este (31 July 1577 – 19 December 1583)[The Deaconry was temporarily a titulus]
- Filippo Guastavillani (19 December 1583 – 7 January 1587)
- Andrea Battorio de Somlio (Báthory) (7 January 1587 – 28 October 1599)

=== 1667–2019 ===
- Carlo Gualterio † (14 Nov 1667 Appointed – 12 Mar 1668 Appointed, Cardinal-Deacon of Santa Maria in Cosmedin)
- Angelo Celsi † (14 May 1668 Appointed – 6 Nov 1671 Died)
- Felice Rospigliosi † (17 Jul 1673 Appointed – 12 Jan 1685 Appointed, Cardinal-Deacon of Sant’Eustachio)
- Giovanni Francesco Ginetti † (12 Jan 1682 Appointed – 28 Nov 1689 Appointed, Cardinal-Deacon of San Nicola in Carcere)
- Gasparo Cavalieri † (28 Nov 1689 Appointed – 17 Aug 1690 Died)
- Francesco Barberini (iuniore) † (27 Nov 1690 Installed – 6 May 1715 Appointed, Cardinal-Priest of San Bernardo alle Terme)
- Carlo Colonna † (6 May 1715 Appointed – 24 Jul 1730 Appointed, Cardinal-Deacon of Sant’Agata de’ Goti)
- Prospero II Colonna † (16 Nov 1739 Installed – 4 Mar 1743 Died)
- Girolamo Colonna di Sciarra † (2 Dec 1743 Installed – )
- Flavio Chigi Jr.) † (26 Nov 1753 Appointed – 12 Feb 1759 Appointed, Cardinal-Deacon of Santa Maria in Portico (Campitelli))
- Andrea Corsini † (19 Nov 1759 Installed – )
- Francesco d’Elci † (10 May 1773 Installed – 4 Apr 1787 Died)
- Vincenzo Maria Altieri † (23 Apr 1787 Appointed – 10 Mar 1788 Appointed, Cardinal-Deacon of Sant’Eustachio)
- Raniero Finocchietti † (10 Mar 1788 Installed – 30 Mar 1789 Appointed, Cardinal-Deacon of Sant’Agata de’ Goti)
- Fernando Spinelli † (3 Aug 1789 Appointed – )
- Filippo Campanelli † (29 Nov 1790 Appointed – 26 Sep 1791 Appointed, Cardinal-Deacon of San Cesareo in Palatio)
- Fabrizio Dionigi Ruffo † (12 Sep 1794 Installed – 11 Aug 1800 Appointed, Cardinal-Deacon of Santa Maria in Cosmedin)
- Alphonse-Hubert de Latier de Bayane † (9 Aug 1802 Appointed – 27 Jul 1818 Died)
- Domenico De Simone † (15 Mar 1830 Appointed – 9 Nov 1837 Died)
- Luigi Ciacchi † (12 Feb 1838 Appointed – 17 Dec 1865 Died)
- Lorenzo Nina † (20 Mar 1877 Appointed – 28 Feb 1879 Appointed, Cardinal-Priest of Santa Maria in Trastevere)
- Frédéric de Falloux du Coudray † (12 May 1879 Appointed – 22 Jun 1884 Died)
- Isidoro Verga † (13 Nov 1884 Appointed – 1 Jun 1891 Appointed, Cardinal-Deacon of Santa Maria in Via Lata)
- Filippo Giustini † (25 May 1914 Appointed – 18 Mar 1920 Died)
- Aurelio Galli † (20 Dec 1923 Appointed – 26 Mar 1929 Died)
- Pietro Boetto, S.J. † (16 Dec 1935 Appointed – 31 Jan 1946 Died); pro illa vice title in 1938
- Augusto da Silva † (15 Jan 1953 Appointed – 14 Aug 1968 Died); pro illa vice title
- Elio Sgreccia † (20 Nov 2010 Appointed – 5 Jun 2019 Died)
- Luis Pascual Dri † (30 September 2023 – 30 June 2025 Died)

== Bibliography ==
Conradus Eubel, Hierarchia catholica medii aevi Tomus I, editio altera (Monasterii 1913), p. 49; Tomus II, editio altera (Monasterii 1914), p. 66 Tomus III (Monasterii 1923), p. 72. [lists of Cardinal-Deacons]
