= San Rocco Hospital (Rome) =

Historical hospital in Rome, Italy

Coordinates: 41°54′21″N 12°28′35″E

Ospedale di San Rocco
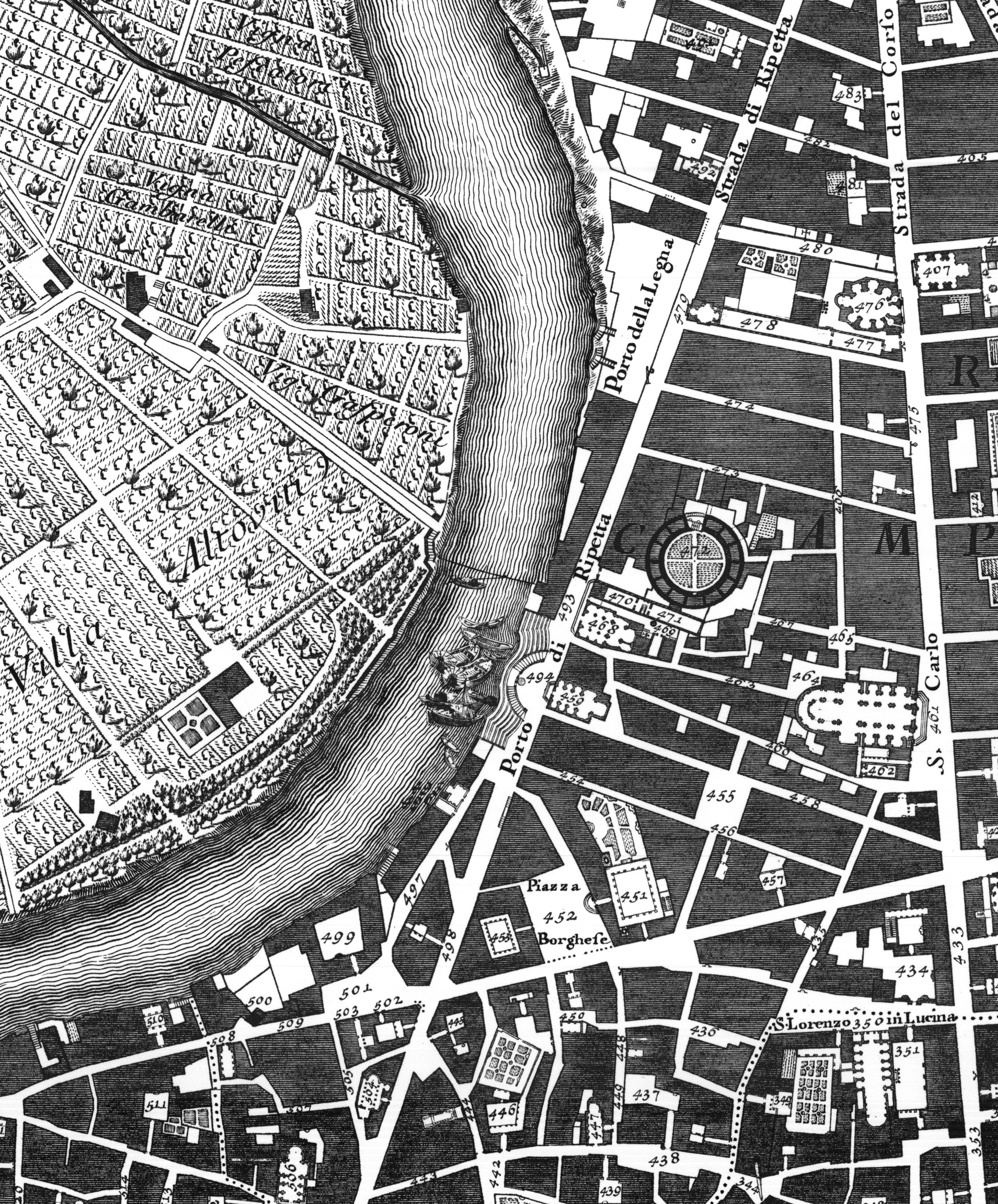
- Giovanni Battista Nolli, Nuova Topografia di Roma (1748). The hospital is marked with the numbers 470 (men's ward) and 471 (women's ward).

Geography
- Location: Rome, Porto di Ripetta, Lazio, Italy

Organisation
- Patron: Saint Roch

History
- Opened: 1524
- Closed: 1892
- Demolished: 1930s

Links
- Lists: Hospitals in Italy

The Hospital of San Rocco at Porto di Ripetta, also known as Ospedale delle Celate, was a hospital in Rome (Italy) built by the Archconfraternity of hosts and boatmen, which also managed the church of San Rocco all'Augusteo. It was rebuilt on the same site at the end of the 18th century and served as a hospital until 1892. The building was demolished in the 1930s to make room for the current Piazza Augusto Imperatore.

== History ==
On 1 June 1499, with the bull Cogitantes humanae conditionis, Pope Alexander VI recognized the right of the St. Roch Archconfraternity of hosts and boatmen, based at Ripetta, to build a church, an oratory and a hospital on a plot of land close to the Mausoleum of Augustus and to dedicate them to the patron Saint Roch. The hospital was built next to the church.
The building rose in a working-class, densely populated neighborhood. A group of cabins, superimposed on each other and perched on the walls of the Mausoleum, was home to families, which made a living from port related activities. The men's hospital, which was already operating in 1524, was enlarged using the land sub montis augustalis and completed in 1528.

The hospital of San Rocco initially operated as a hospice for the plague victims and had a female ward and a male ward. It then changed its intended use and became a generic hospital, accepting travailing women among others. A wing was assigned to the wives of the boatmen, to prevent them giving birth on the boats, in unhealthy conditions. Its proximity to the ortacci – Italian for "bad gardens", that is, the enclosures assigned to prostitutes between Via del Corso and Via di Ripetta – entailed a considerable workload for the hospital, due to the reception of the so-called celate (Italian for "hidden") pregnant women, called "travailing women."

=== The travailing women and the celate ===
They arrived at night, with their faces covered; they were registered with a number and no one could find out their identity. Their faces remained hidden from everyone except the midwife and obstetrician. Their newborns were addressed to the Pia Casa degli Esposti, at the Hospital of the Holy Spirit. For the celate the hospitalization was free up to eight days after the birth; but, if they also wanted to hide their pregnancy, they had to paid 3 scudi a day (risen to 32 in the 19th century). They had separate rooms with curtained beds. The privacy concerned everyone: relatives, onlookers, religious and judicial authorities, and was never violated.
If a celata died in childbirth, her body was buried in a reserved cemetery outside Porta del Popolo, and her grave was identified with the hospital access number. The small cemetery disappeared when Via del Muro Torto was opened.

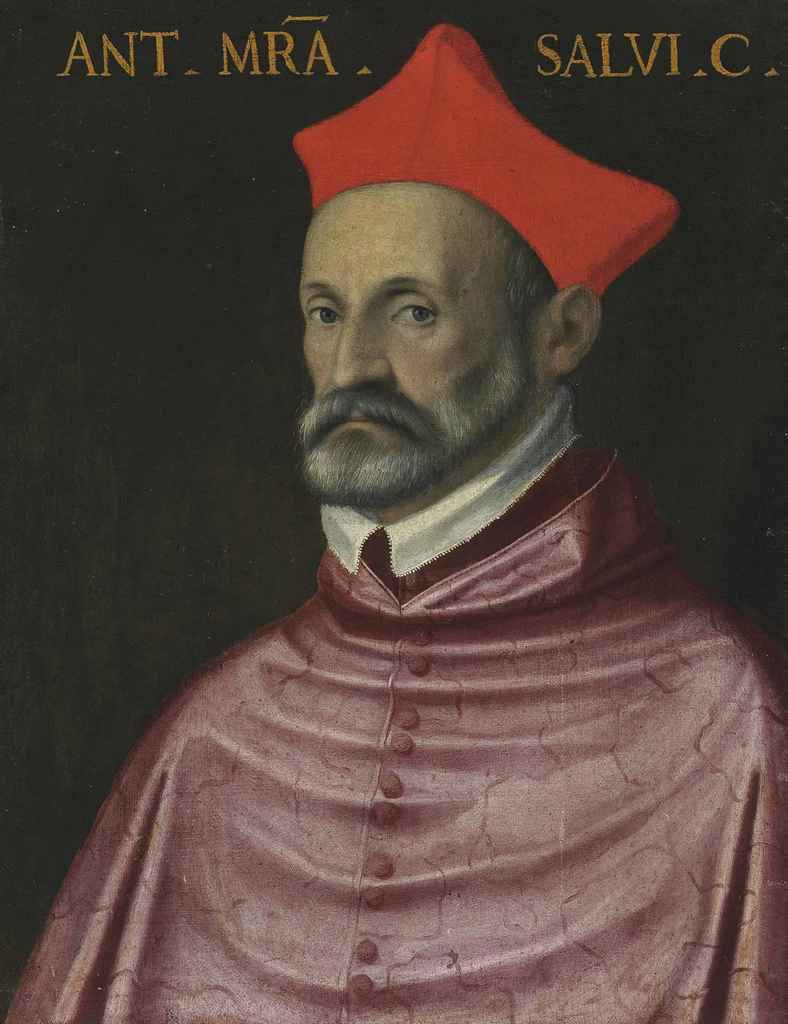
Portrait of Cardinal Antonio Maria Salviati.

Cardinal Antonio Maria Salviati, a protector of the Archconfraternity, assigned by will to the hospital his estate in Acquasona near Galeria, in the north area of the city, the proceeds from which were to be used to close the male ward and dedicate the whole hospital to women, especially to pregnant ones, both exposed and celate. The hospital was therefore rebuilt between 1605 and 1612, at a cost of 5,659 scudi, by demolishing two houses leaning to the tomb of Augustus and buying a garden belonging to the nearby church of San Girolamo. Both the project and the supervision of the works were assigned to Carlo Maderno. It began to operate as a hospital for women only in 1608 and continued for almost three centuries.

In 1770, a brief by Pope Clement XIV closed the ward for sick women and reserved the hospital only for women in labor (the men's ward, closed a long time before, had fallen into disrepair).
It was decided to sell the property in Acquasona and use the proceeds to rebuild the hospital from scratch, in the same place and with the same outward form. The project was entrusted to the architect Nicola Forti; the works began in 1772 and were completed in 1776. The dispute with the Corea family – owner of the mausoleum of Augustus, where theatre performances were held – was closed by assigning to the Archconfraternity of San Rocco all the archaeological finds brought to light by the excavations under the former building of the hospital. Among them there was also an obelisk broken into three pieces, the twin of the one found long before and raised on the Esquiline: Pope Pius VI ordered it to be handed over to him and raised it in Piazza del Quirinale. The presence of the obelisk in the foundations of the former hospital had conditioned its shape, a long and narrow rectangle.

The new San Rocco Hospital had on the first floor a ward measuring 34 metres (112 ft) by 9 metres (30 ft), with ten large windows; on the second floor, a room of the same size, but with a lower ceiling, was used as a "stroll" area for pregnant women. The rooms of the celate were apart.
At that time the hospital had 20 beds and assisted 300 women in labor every year. About 4–5% of the inmates underwent operations; in 1820 there were 12 deaths from childbirth.

Curatolo, who examined the documentation at the State Archives of Rome, reports some data: the deaths were more frequent among the celate, since a higher rate of them suffered from tuberculosis, Malarial fever, stomach upset and rickets.

=== University chair in obstetrics ===
In 18th century obstetrics got transformed from empiricist practice to science and subject taught in the Universities.

In 1786 Cardinal Carlo Rezzonico, Chamberlain and Archchancellor of Studies, promulgated the edict concerning the methods for Obstetrics study at the University of Rome. He assigned a room above the sacristy of the church of San Rocco to the theoretical courses of Obstetrics, held by the Professor of the newly created chair of Obstetrics of the Sapienza University. The small room was accessed through a door on Via di Schiavonia – a road that no longer exists – close to the present bridge between the churches of San Girolamo and San Rocco. The courses reserved for midwives were held from November to Easter; Obstetrics training for medical university students, from White Sunday until mid-September.

The surgeon Francesco Asdrubali (1756–1832), who was the first chair of Obstetrics of Sapienza University, was also the chief surgeon of the San Rocco. His successors had the same dual post.

=== The "dream" of Panunzi ===
In those years the hosts and boatmen of Ripetta provided abundant housing and food to the university students, who had become more numerous than those enrolled in Theology and Pharmacy.

In 1855 the holder of the chair of Obstetrics and chief physician of the San Rocco Hospital was Antonio Panunzi. He addressed to Cardinal Carlo Luigi Morichini, president of the Roman Hospitals, the request to move the hospital to a new location, in a southerly decentralized area, where it was expected that the city would expand. He wished new headquarters with gardens, bathrooms, separate wards for pregnant women and for new mothers as well as separate rooms for natural and "morbid" birth. He asked for delivery rooms apart from the wards and a physiopathological-anatomical cabinet; he wished that the newborns were not hastily separated from the unmarried mothers.

To enhance night-time care, Panunzi asked for a boarding school for midwife students, whose education was to be extended to 18 months. In his opinion, obstetrics classes should be reserved for graduated doctors with at least one year of hospital experience.

The official requests of Antonio Panunzi were not taken into consideration, also due to the removal of Cardinal Morichini from Rome. Panunzi renewed his proposals in 1858 and in 1865 the Department of Obstetrics at the San Giovanni Hospital was finally inaugurated. In 1876 San Giovanni Hospital became the only Roman seat for the university courses of Obstetrics.

=== The restorations ===
In 1860 the upper family of the San Rocco Hospital was made up of the rector, the doctor, the obstetric surgeon, the bursar, a prioress and a midwife; the low family included the housekeeper and the doorman. Its cash-outflows amounted to 3,529 scudi, with a profit of 702 scudi.

In 1867 toilets with tap water were installed and a house for the staff was built. In 1870 – on the eve of the capture of Rome – the beds for the "exposed" pregnant women were sixteen and separate rooms for childbirth were finally available; on the second floor there were other 16 beds for the celate and the attic served as a drying room. The doctor Diomede Pantaleoni, Commissioner of the Ospedali Riuniti, ordered to restore the attic, adding bathrooms and tap water, to transform it into a delivery room; he also organized an autopsy cabinet – an unknown practice within the hospital until then – in the basement.
In 1871 the San Rocco was accredited by the Ministry of Education and obtained an annual subsidy of 4,050 lire.

=== The end ===
In 1892 the Hospital of San Rocco was suppressed: the ground floor was transformed into a concert hall dedicated to Giovanni Sgambati, where the concerts of the Accademia di Santa Cecilia were held.
All the women in labor were transferred to the hospital of San Giovanni, where a separate wing into a tower, with 8 beds, was destined for the celate and operated until the end of the 1940s.

The building of the hospital of San Rocco was demolished between 1934 and 1938, during the renovation works in the area around the Mausoleum of Augustus. The bell tower of the church of San Rocco was also destroyed.

== Bibliography ==
- Fausto Garofalo (1949). L'Ospedale di S. Rocco delle Partorienti e delle Celate. Rome: Arti graf. Pinnarò.
- Antonio Pachì; Fausta Samaritani (1986). Ostetricia e Ginecologia a La Sapienza 1786–1986. Rome: Edizioni Studio Ega.
- Franca Fedeli Bernardini (1994). "L'Arcispedale di S. Rocco da nosocomio a ospedale delle partorienti". L'Ospedale dei pazzi di Roma dai papi al '900. Vol. II. Edizioni Dedalo. pp. 279–280.

== See also ==
- History of hospitals
