= Santa Maria dei Raccomandati, Orvinio =

17th-century Roman Catholic church in Orvinio, Italy

Santa Maria dei Raccomandati is a 17th-century Roman Catholic church and former Franciscan convent and hostel outside of the town of Orvinio, in the province of Rieti, region of Lazio, Italy.

The church was erected just outside the town walls in 1582. A 1638 document calls this the Convent of Canemorto, referring to the old name of Orvinio. In 1653, under Pope Innocent X, the convent was suppressed and only reopened when the commune provided the monks with support. The adjacent cloister has a view of the countryside. The facade was rebuilt in a neoclassical style. The interior has a single nave with lateral altars. The church is notable for frescoes by Vincenzo Manenti.
