= Santa Maria del Piano, Orvinio =

Coordinates: 42.1372°N 12.9560°E

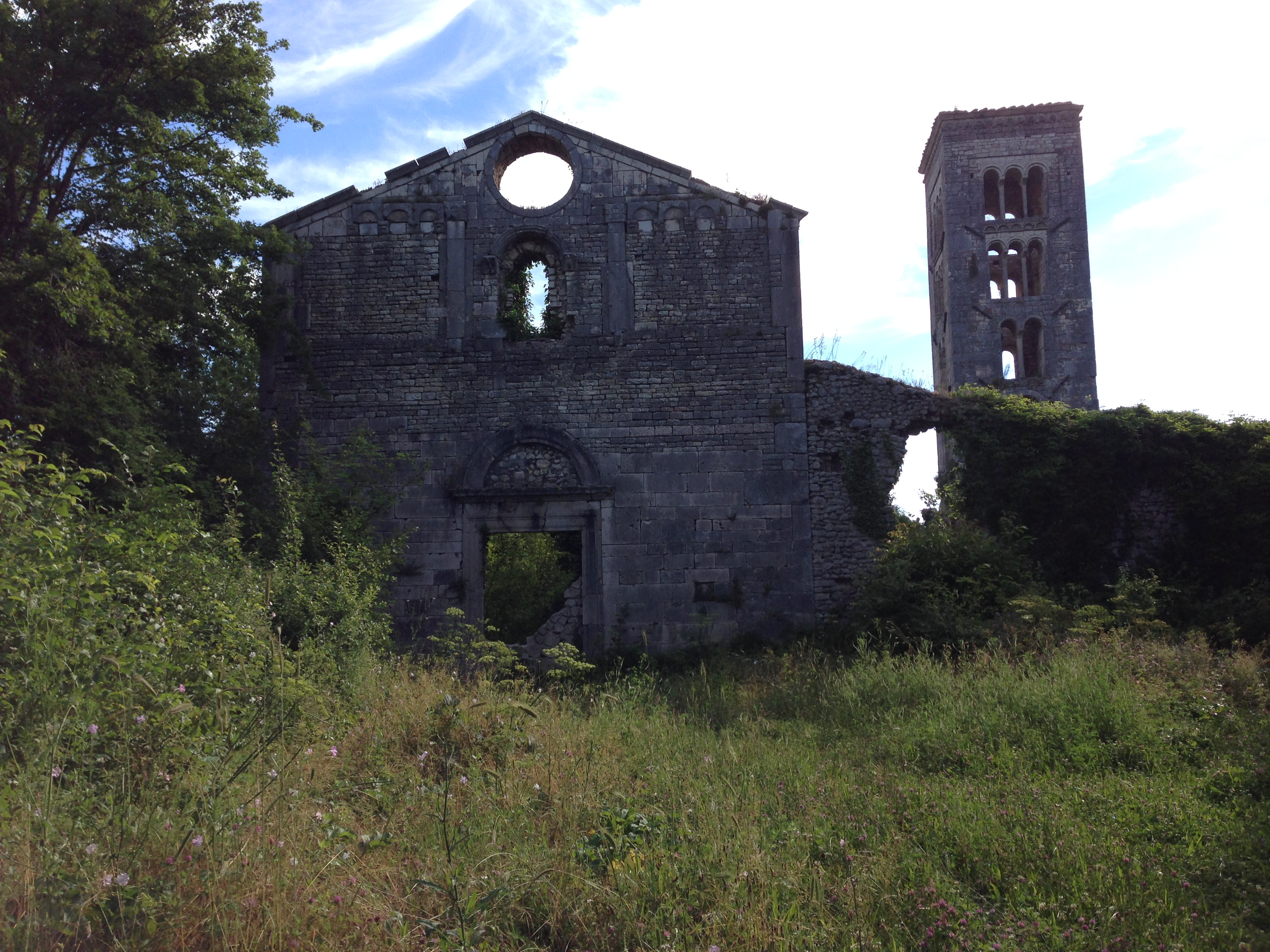
Facade and Belltower.

Santa Maria del Piano is a former Roman Catholic church and Benedictine abbey located outside of the town of Orvinio, in the province of Rieti, region of Lazio, Italy. Only ruined elements of the Romanesque facade and bell-tower remain. It is sometimes called Santa Maria di Pozzaglia.

Construction here putatively started in the 9th-century, linked to a victory by the army of Charlemagne against a marauding Saracen army in the plain nearby. The first documentation of the monastery is found in documents from the Abbey of Farfa, and controlled much of the surrounding territory. The Abbey is also mentioned in documents by popes Leo X and Innocent X. An inscription on the façade states that presbyter Bartholomew restored the church in 1219. By the early 1500s, the monastery fell in to rapid decline. Replaced by Franciscans in 1582, the Benedictines were reintroduced in 1683. But ultimately the monastery was abandoned after the Napoleonic invasion. The land was used as a cemetery in the 19th-century but the structures continued to be looted for stone. An earthquake in the 19th-century caused near collapse. The present ruins were reconstructed in the 1950s.

The layout of the church was of a Latin cross with a double apse and an 11th-century bell-tower. Most of the decoration of the stone were removed.
