= Luis Pascual Dri =

Argentine priest of the Catholic Church (1927–2025)

His Eminence Luis Pascual Dri OFMCap
- Cardinal-Deacon of Sant'Angelo in Pescheria
- Church: Catholic Church
- Appointed: 30 September 2023
- Term ended: 30 June 2025
- Predecessor: Elio Sgreccia
- Successor: Vacant
- Other post: Confessor of the Shrine of Our Lady of Pompei

Orders
- Ordination: 29 March 1952 by Antonio María Barbieri
- Created cardinal: 30 September 2023 by Pope Francis
- Rank: Cardinal-Deacon

Personal details
- Born: Luis Pascual Dri; 17 April 1927 Federación, Entre Ríos, Argentina
- Died: 30 June 2025 (aged 98) Buenos Aires, Argentina

Styles of Luis Pascual Dri
- Reference style: His Eminence
- Spoken style: Your Eminence
- Informal style: Cardinal

Luis Pascual Dri, OFM Cap. (17 April 1927 – 30 June 2025) was an Argentine priest of the Catholic Church. He was a member of the Order of Friars Minor Capuchin.

Pope Francis made him a cardinal on 30 September 2023.

== Biography ==
Luis Pascual Dri was born on 17 April 1927 in Federación, in the province of Entre Ríos, Argentina. From a very young age, he took care of the work in the fields, taking care of the animals and also planting corn and alfalfa. He attended the local rural school. He entered the Capuchin Seminary at the age of 11 in January 1938 and completed his primary and secondary studies there. He entered the novitiate in the Nuevo París neighborhood of Montevideo, Uruguay and took his first vows on 21 February 1945. In 1949, he made his perpetual profession. He was ordained a priest on 29 March 1952 in the cathedral of Montevideo.

He became director of the San Francisco de Carrasco Minor Seminary in 1953. In 1955, he became director of the Seraphic Seminary of Villa Gdor, Galvez, Argentina, and in 1959 master of novices in San Francisco de Carrasco. Beginning in 1961 he worked in Europe as formator of novices.

From 1962 to 1974, he taught at the Colegio y Liceo Secco Illa de Uruguay. He was briefly the parish priest in Empalme and Colonia Nicolich and then in 1976 became master of novices in the Minas, Uruguay, moving in 1983 to the parish of San Enrique de Villa Gdor in Galvez. In 1987, he was appointed parish priest of Santa María de la Ayuda in El Cerro de Montevideo. From 2000 to 2003, he was parish priest at the Shrine of Our Lady of Pompei in the Nueva Pompeya neighborhood of Buenos Aires, then parish priest in Mar del Plata. He retired in 2007 at the age of 80 and returned to the Shrine where he continued to hear confessions for several hours each day.

Pope Francis spoke of his work as a confessor on several occasions. Dri described meeting Pope Francis often when he was archbishop of Buenos Aires and reported that Francis had then sent priests to see him for counseling. Dri in turn cited as his models and mentors two Capuchins, Leopold Mandić and Padre Pio, having the latter as his confessor in 1960 when they lived in the same convent.

On 9 July 2023, Pope Francis announced he plans to make him a cardinal at a consistory scheduled for 30 September. Dri did not attend the consistory because of his health and age. He received his cardinal's regalia on 11 October from Archbishop Mirosław Adamczyk, Apostolic Nuncio to Argentina, at a ceremony in the cathedral of Buenos Aires. At that consistory, he was made cardinal deacon of Sant'Angelo in Pescheria.

Dri died in Buenos Aires on 30 June 2025, at the age of 98.

== See also ==
- Cardinals created by Francis

Catholic Church titles
Preceded by Elio Sgreccia	Cardinal-Deacon of Sant'Angelo in Pescheria; 2023–2025	Vacant
