= Symphorosa =

2nd century Christian female saint

Saint Symphorosa
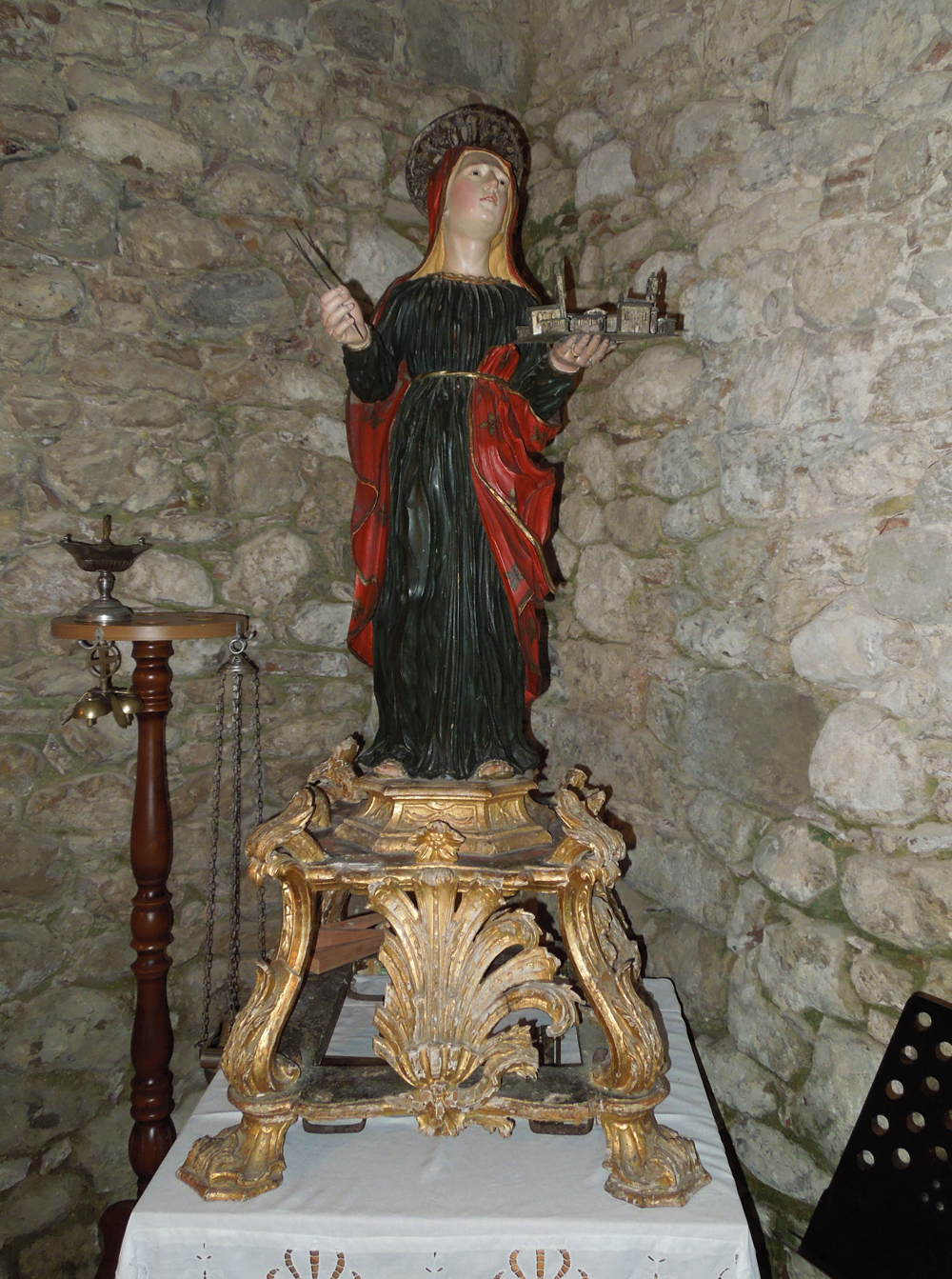
- Wooden statue of Saint Symphorosa, in the church of Sant'Antonio Abate di Tossicia, Italy

Martyr
- Died: circa AD 138; The Anio (Aniene), Tibur (Tivoli), Italy
- Venerated in: Catholic Church
- Major shrine: Sant'Angelo in Pescheria, Rome, Italy
- Feast: 18 July
- Attributes: Seven sons including Saint Primitivus, martyr's palm
- Patronage: Tivoli, Italy

Symphorosa (Italian: Sinforosa; died circa AD 138) is venerated as a saint of the Catholic Church. According to tradition, she was martyred with her seven sons at Tibur (present Tivoli, Lazio, Italy) toward the end of the reign of the Roman Emperor Hadrian (117–38), or during the reign of Trajan.

== Narrative ==
The story of their martyrdom is told in an ancient Passio, the credibility of which is seriously questioned by many modern hagiologists. According to the Passio, Symphorosa was a Tiburtine matron and the widow of Getulius, a native of Gabii in Sabina. He was a tribune in the Roman army, but resigned upon being baptized a Christian, ultimately retiring to his estate near Tivoli, where he was joined by his brother, Amantius. Getulius and Amantius were subsequently beheaded under Emperor Hadrian. Symphorosa buried his remains on their estate.

Not long after, Symphorosa and her children were arrested. When all of the Emperor's attempts to induce Symphorosa and her sons to sacrifice to the pagan Roman gods were unsuccessful, he ordered her to be brought to the Temple of Hercules, where, after various tortures, she was thrown into the Anio River with a heavy rock fastened to her neck. Her brother Eugenius, who was a member of the council of Tibur, buried her with her husband.

== Her seven sons ==
The next day, the emperor summoned Symphorosa's seven sons, and being equally unsuccessful in his attempts to make them sacrifice to the gods, he ordered them to be tied to seven stakes erected for the purpose round the Temple of Hercules. The emperor ordered all seven to be tortured, and finally pierced with the sword.

Their bodies were thrown en masse into a deep ditch at a place the pagan priests afterwards called Ad septem Biothanatos (the Greek word biodanatos, or rather biaiodanatos, was employed for self-murderers and, by the pagans, applied to Christians who suffered martyrdom). Hereupon the persecution ceased for one year and six months, during which period the bodies of the martyrs were recovered by the Christian community and buried on the Via Tiburtina, eight or nine miles (13 or 14 km) from Rome.

== Authenticity ==
It is difficult to ascertain how much reliability these Acts possess. The opinion that they were written by Julius Africanus (3rd century) has been rejected almost universally, since neither Eusebius nor any other contemporary historian makes the least allusion to any Acts of Roman or Italian martyrs composed by this African writer.

The Hieronymian Martyrology, which was compiled by an unknown author in the second half of the 5th century, commemorates Symphorosa and her sons on 18 July, but here the names of her sons are entirely different from those given in the Acts, suggesting that this martyrology draws on some other source. In the same martyrology, on 27 June, are commemorated seven brother-martyrs, whose names are identical with those elsewhere given for the sons of Symphorosa. The Catholic Encyclopedia speculates that these may have been later misappropriated as the names of Symphorosa's seven sons. Some hagiologists consider the seven sons of Symphorosa, like those of Felicitas of Rome, a mere adaptation of the seven sons of the Maccabean Mother. Paul Allard dealt with her story uncritically in his work.

In the seventeenth century, Bosio discovered the ruins of a basilica at the place popularly called "le sette fratte" (taken to be a corruption of words meaning "the seven brothers"), on the Via Tiburtina, nine miles (14 km) from Rome. The Acts and the Hieronymian Martyrology agree in designating this spot as the tomb of Symphorosa and her sons. Further discoveries, that leave no room for doubt that the basilica was built over their tomb, were made by Stevenson. The remains were transferred to the Church of Sant'Angelo in Pescheria at Rome by Pope Stephen II in 752. A sarcophagus was found here in 1610, bearing the inscription: Hic requiescunt corpora SS. Martyrum Simforosae, viri sui Zotici (Getulii) et Filiorum ejus a Stephano Papa translata (Here rest the bodies of the holy martyrs Symphorosa, her husband Zotius (Getulius) and her sons, transferred by Pope Stephen).

== Veneration ==
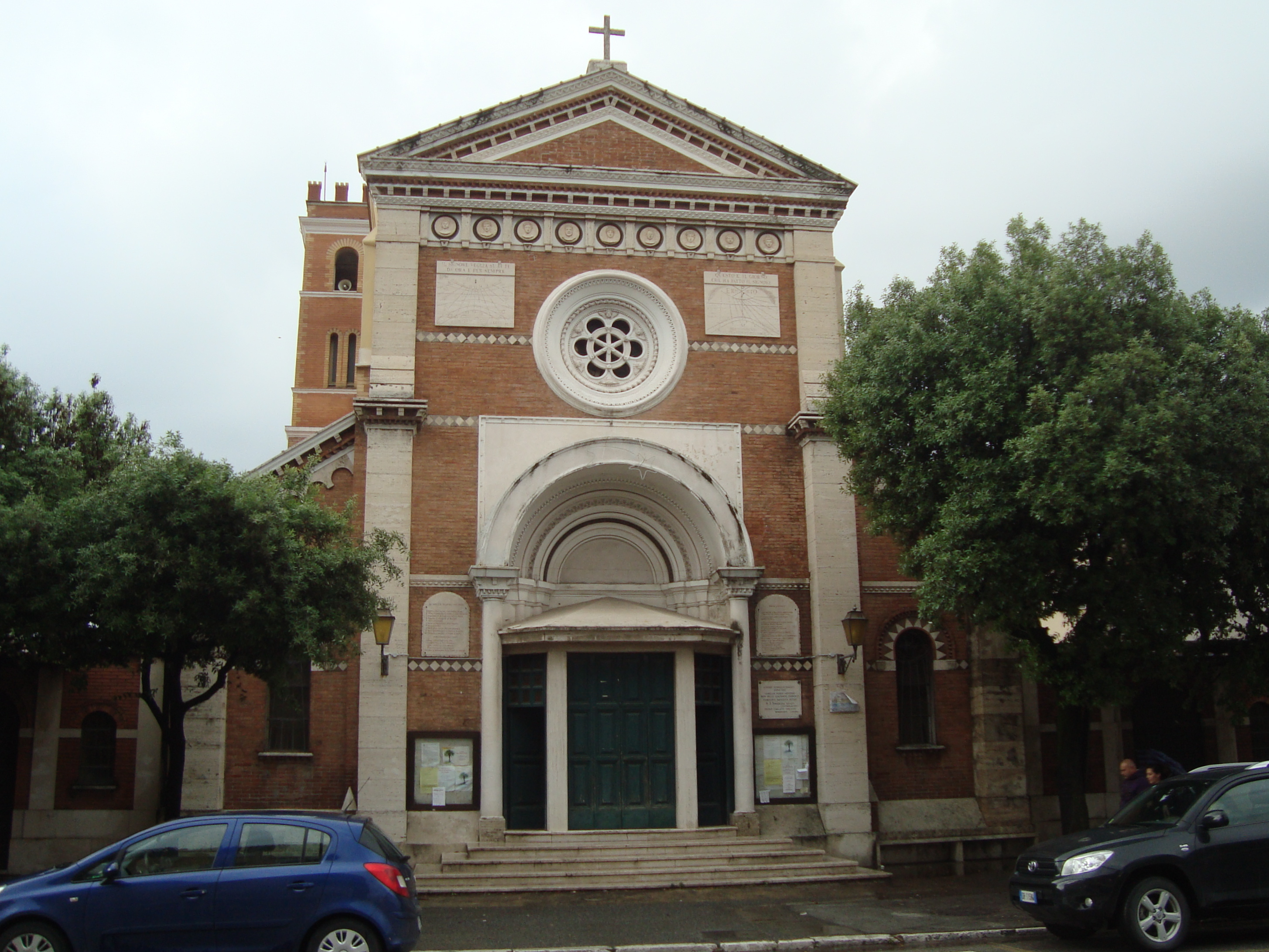
Church of Santa Sinforosa in Tivoli

The Diocese of Tivoli honours them as patron saints and they are mentioned in the Roman Martyrology on 18 July. However, they are no longer included in the General Roman Calendar. The reason given for their removal was that the information given in their Acts, which are thought to be an imitation of the Passio of Saint Felicitas of Rome and her seven sons, is untrustworthy.

In medieval times Settecamini was called "Field of Seven Brothers" in relation to the legend of Saint Symphorosa and her seven children.

There is a St. Symphorosa Elementary School in Chicago, Illinois.
