= Getulius =

Christian martyr and saint

Saint Getulius

Protomartyrs of Sabina
- Born: Gabii (Getulius)
- Died: 120 AD; Gabii
- Venerated in: Roman Catholic Church, Orthodox Church
- Major shrine: Sant'Angelo in Pescheria, Rome
- Feast: June 10

Saint Getulius (died 120 AD) is venerated together with Amantius (Amancius), Cerealus (Caerealis), and Primitivus (Italian: Getulio, Amanzio, Cereale, e Primitivo) as a Christian martyr and saint. They are considered to have died at Gabii. According to tradition, Getulius was the husband of Saint Symphorosa. Getulius is a name meaning "of the Gaetuli", which was a tribe of North Africa.

== Legends and burial ==
According to his legend, Getulius was a native of Gabii in Sabina. Getulius was an officer in the Roman army who resigned when he became a Christian. He retired to his estates near Tivoli. Caerealis was an imperial legate sent to arrest him but was converted to Christianity by Getulius. Primitivus was another officer sent to arrest him, but he was also converted. Amantius was Getulius' brother.

According to his Passio, all four men were tied to a stake and set alight. However, the fire did not harm them, so they were brutally clubbed and then beheaded.

Some say Getulius was killed on the Via Salaria and is called the father of the Seven Martyrs and the husband of Symphorosa. His companions are called Caerealis, Amantius, and Primitivus. They were imprisoned, thrown into the flames but emerged unharmed, and then beaten to death with clubs. The legend further states that Saint Symphorosa buried them in an arenarium on her estate.

Their seven sons (not to be confused with the seven sons of Felicity of Rome) are named specifically. According to their legend, each of them suffered a different kind of martyrdom. Crescens was pierced through the throat, Julian through the breast, Nemesius through the heart, Primitivus was wounded at the navel, Justinus was pierced through the back, Stracteus (Stacteus, Estacteus) was wounded at the side, and Eugenius was cleft in two parts from top to bottom.

The Martyrology of Ado states: consumati sunt beati Martyres Gethulii in fundo Capriolis, viam Salariam, ab urbe Romam, plus minus miliario decimotertio, supra flumium Tiberim, in partem Savinensium. By Capriolis, viam Salariam, Ado is referring to a place on the Tiber River later known in the Middle Ages as the Corte di San Getulio (today part of Montopoli di Sabina), because a church was built here that originally held some of the saint's relics. In 867, Abbot Peter of Farfa moved these relics to his abbey in a solemn ceremony. However, Getulius' relics are also considered to lie in Rome.

== Veneration ==
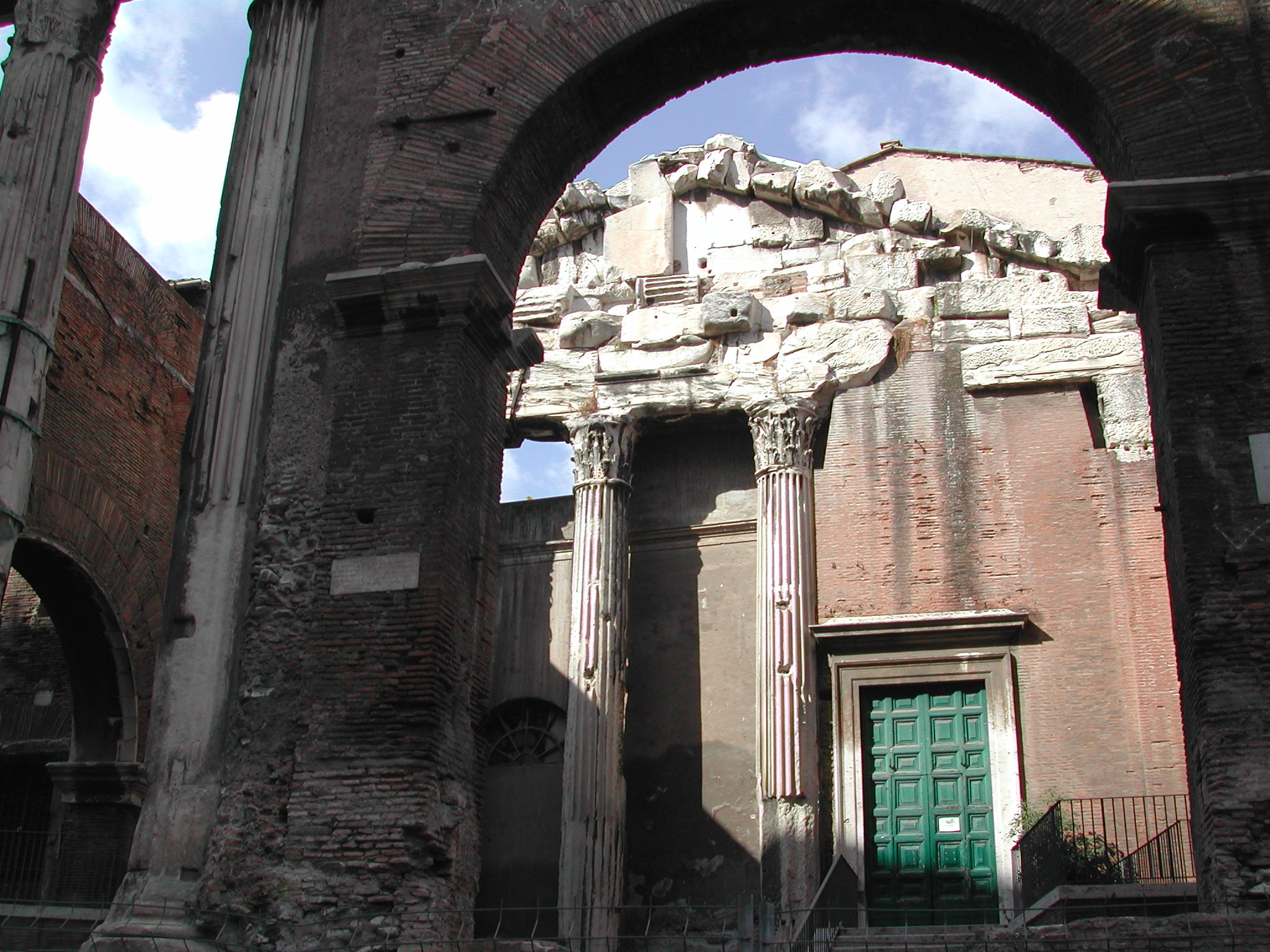
The façade of Sant'Angelo in Pescheria

There was previously a church of San Getulio at Teramo.

Getulius' relics are purported to be at Rome, in the principal altar of the church of Sant'Angelo in Pescheria. His relics are also purported to be enshrined in an altar in the Metropolitan Cathedral Basilica of Santa María la Antigua in Panama City, Panama.

The relics of his purported wife St. Symphorosa and their seven sons were transferred to the Church of Sant'Angelo in Pescheria at Rome by Pope Stephen II in 752. A sarcophagus was found here in 1610, bearing the inscription: Hic requiescunt corpora SS. Martyrum Simforosae, viri sui Zotici (Getulii) et Filiorum ejus a Stephano Papa translata. They were placed in a glass urn during the pontificate of Pius IV, who placed the relics in an urn of glass. In 1584, part of his relics were donated by Gregory XIII to the Jesuits, and these relics are found in a chapel near the Villa d'Este. Some relics were taken to Jesuit colleges in India and Spain (June 25, 1572). On September 26, 1587, to prevent further distribution, Mariano Perbenedetti, governor of Rome, enclosed the rest of the relics at Sant'Angelo in a sarcophagus of marble. This same sarcophagus also holds relics of Cyrus and John.
