= Orvinio =

- Comune
- Comune di Orvinio
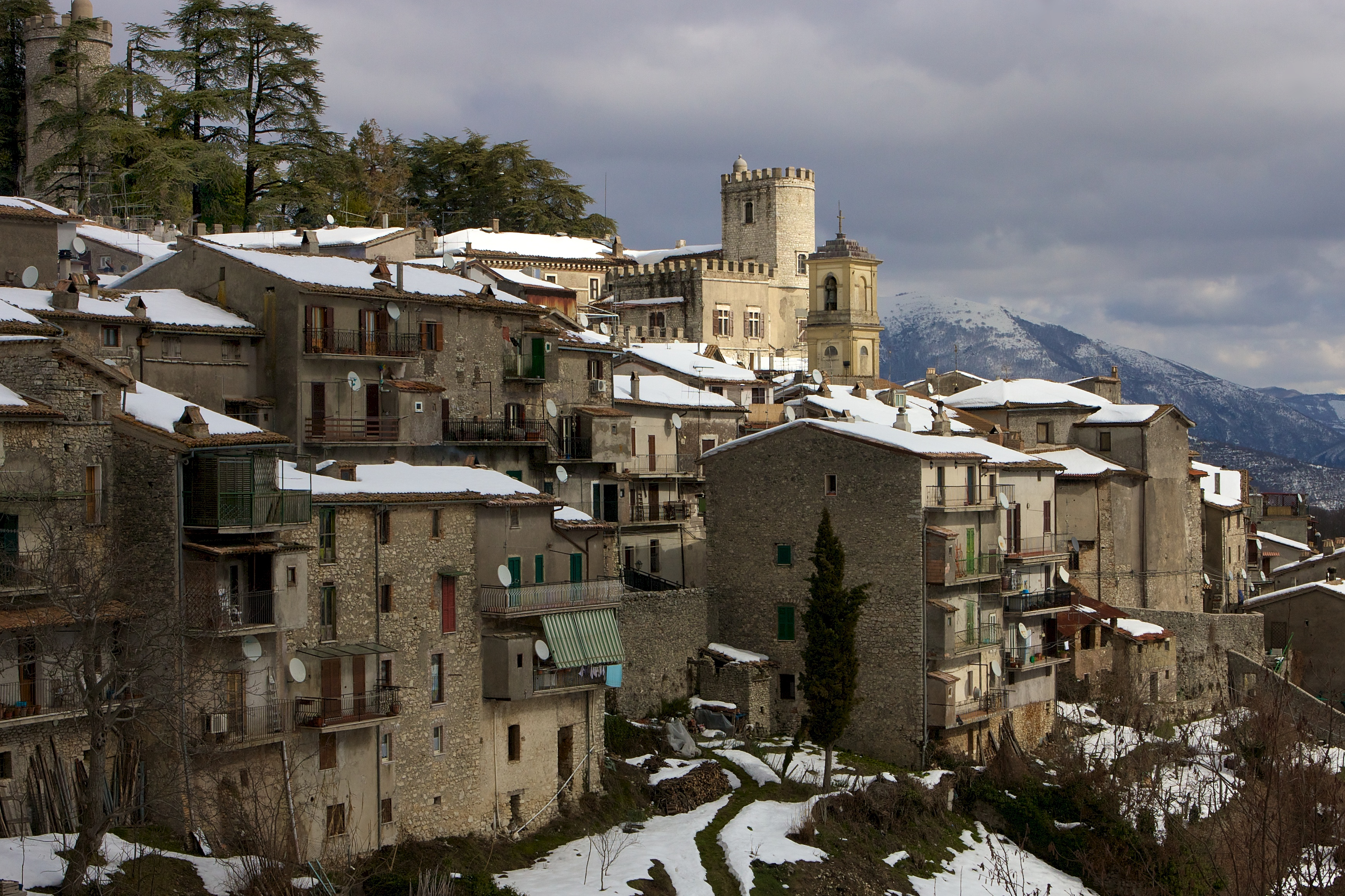
- View of Orvinio

- Coat of arms

- Location within Italy Location within Lazio
- Coordinates: 42°8′N 12°56′E
- Country: Italy
- Region: Lazio
- Province: Rieti (RI)

Government
  - Mayor: Elisa Grieco

Area
  - Total: 24.69 km^{2} (9.53 sq mi)
- Elevation: 840 m (2,760 ft)

Population (31 January 2022)
  - Total: 394
  - Density: 16.0/km^{2} (41.3/sq mi)
- Demonym: Orviniesi
- Time zone: UTC+1 (CET)
  - Summer (DST): UTC+2 (CEST)
- Postal code: 02035
- Dialing code: 0765
- Website: www.comune.orvinio.ri.it

Orvinio is a comune (municipality) in the Province of Rieti in the Italian region of Latium, located about 45 kilometres (28 mi) northeast of Rome and about 30 kilometres (19 mi) south of Rieti. It is one of I Borghi più belli d'Italia ("The most beautiful villages of Italy").

The ancient city of Orvinium was destroyed before the year 1000. The successor town was named “Canemortem”, or later "Canemorto", till it was changed to Orvinio in 1863. There are multiple stories as to why the name Canemorto had previously been attached to the site.

== Main sights ==
Among the landmarks in the town are:

- Santa Maria dei Raccomandati
- Ruins of the Abbey of Santa Maria del Piano
