= Poggio Nativo =

- Comune
- Comune di Poggio Nativo
- Coat of arms

- Location within Italy Location within Lazio
- Coordinates: 42°13′N 12°48′E
- Country: Italy
- Region: Lazio
- Province: Rieti (RI)

Government
  - Mayor: Vittore Antonini

Area
  - Total: 16.4 km^{2} (6.3 sq mi)
- Elevation: 415 m (1,362 ft)

Population (2008)
  - Total: 2,352
  - Density: 143/km^{2} (371/sq mi)
- Demonym: Poggionativesi
- Time zone: UTC+1 (CET)
  - Summer (DST): UTC+2 (CEST)
- Postal code: 02030
- Dialing code: 0765
- Patron saint: St. Michael Archangel
- Saint day: September 29

Poggio Nativo (Sabino: Pugginaddio) is a comune (municipality) in the Province of Rieti in the Italian region of Latium, located about 45 kilometres (28 mi) northeast of Rome and about 20 kilometres (12 mi) southwest of Rieti.

Poggio Nativo borders the following municipalities: Casaprota, Castelnuovo di Farfa, Frasso Sabino, Mompeo, Nerola, Poggio Moiano, Scandriglia, Toffia.

Poggio Nativo is home to the Santacittarama Theravada Buddhist monastery. Economy is mostly based on agriculture (cereals, olives, vines, fruit) and cattle raising.

Among the main landmarks is the San Paolo church and former monastery.
