= Menzi =

Menzi may refer to:

- Menzi (food), a Chinese street food
- Menzi, a barangay of Isabela, Basilan, Philippines
- Menzi High School, Umlazi, KwaZulu-Natal, South Africa

== People ==
=== Surname ===
- Pietro Menzi (died 1504), Italian Roman Catholic prelate

=== Given name ===
- Menzi Dlamini (born 1971), Swazi sprinter
- Menzi Masuku (born 1993), South African footballer
- Menzi Ndwandwe (born 1997), South African footballer
- Menzi Ngubane (1964–2021), South African actor
- Menzi Simelane (born 1970), South African advocate

== See also ==
- Menzie, a given name and surname
