= Menzio =

Menzio is an Italian surname. Notable people with the surname include:

- Anna Menzio (1905–1994), stage name Wanda Osiris, Italian revue soubrette, actress and singer
- Francesco Menzio (1899–1979), Italian painter

== See also ==
- Enzio
- Menzi (disambiguation)
