= Pietro Ridolfi (bishop) =

Roman Catholic prelate

Most Reverend Pietro Ridolfi, OFM Conv
- Bishop of Senigallia
- Church: Catholic Church
- Diocese: Diocese of Senigallia
- In office: 1591–1601
- Predecessor: Girolamo Rusticucci
- Successor: Antaldo degli Antaldi
- Previous post: Bishop of Venosa (1587–1591)

Orders
- Consecration: 24 February 1587 by Giulio Antonio Santorio

Personal details
- Died: 18 May 1601 Senigallia, Italy

Pietro Ridolfi, OFM Conv (died 18 May 1601) was a Roman Catholic prelate who served as Bishop of Senigallia (1591–1601) and Bishop of Venosa (1587–1591).

== Biography ==
Pietro Ridolfi was ordained a friar in the Order of Friars Minor Conventual. On 18 February 1587, he was appointed during the papacy of Pope Sixtus V as Bishop of Venosa. On 24 February 1587, he was consecrated bishop by Giulio Antonio Santorio, Cardinal-Priest of San Bartolomeo all'Isola, with Stefano Bonucci, Bishop of Arezzo, Annibale Grassi, Bishop Emeritus of Faenza, and Leonard Abel, Titular Bishop of Sidon serving as co-consecrators. On 18 February 1591, he was appointed during the papacy of Pope Gregory XIV as Bishop of Senigallia. He served as Bishop of Senigallia until his death on 18 May 1601.

== Episcopal succession ==
While bishop, he was the principal co-consecrator of:

- Giovanni Battista Bernini, Bishop of Chiron (1587);
- Annibal Pauli, Bishop of Cervia (1587); and
- Camillo Gualandi, Bishop of Cesena (1588).

== External links and additional sources ==
- Cheney, David M. "Diocese of Venosa". Catholic-Hierarchy.org. (for Chronology of Bishops) ^{[self-published]}
- Chow, Gabriel. "Diocese of Venosa". GCatholic.org. (for Chronology of Bishops) ^{[self-published]}

Catholic Church titles
Preceded by Giovanni Gerolamo Mareri	Bishop of Venosa; 1587–1591	Succeeded by Vincenzo Calcio
Preceded by Girolamo Rusticucci	Bishop of Senigallia; 1591–1601	Succeeded by Antaldo degli Antaldi
