= Giovanni Battista Spiriti =

Most Reverend Giovanni Battista Spiriti
- Coadjutor Bishop-elect of Cesena
- Church: Catholic Church
- Archdiocese: Latin Patriarchate of Jerusalem
- In office: 1550–1556
- Predecessor: Cristoforo Spiriti
- Successor: Odoardo Gualandi

Giovanni Battista Spiriti was a Roman Catholic prelate who served as Coadjutor of the Bishop of Cesena (1545–1556).

== Biography ==
On 27 November 1545, at the age of 24, while still a student at Perugia, Giovanni Battista Spiriti was appointed Coadjutor to the Bishop of Cesena, with the right of succession, by Pope Paul III. The diocese was then held by Giovanni Battista's uncle, Bishop Cristoforo Spiriti. Battista Spiriti administered the diocese until his resignation on 5 November 1556, the date of the death of his uncle.

Catholic Church titles
Preceded by Cristoforo Spiriti	Coadjutor Bishop-elect Bishop of Cesena; 1545–1556	Succeeded by Odoardo Gualandi
