= Von Pfeil =

von Pfeil, von Pfeil und Klein-Ellguth is a German noble family. Notable people with the surname include:

- Enzio von Pfeil (born 1953), German economist
- Joachim von Pfeil Graf von Pfeil und Klein-Ellguth (1857–1924), German explorer and colonist
- Count Jefferson von Pfeil und Klein-Ellguth (born 1967), German noble
