= Stefano Agostini =

Stefano Agostini may refer to:

- Stefano Agostini (cardinal) (1614–1683), Italian Roman Catholic cardinal
- Stefano Agostini (cyclist) (born 1989), Italian professional road cyclist
