= San Giovanni a Porta Latina =

Catholic basilica, a landmark of Rome, Italy

- St. John before the Latin Gate (in English); Sancti Ioanne ad Portam Latinam (in Latin)
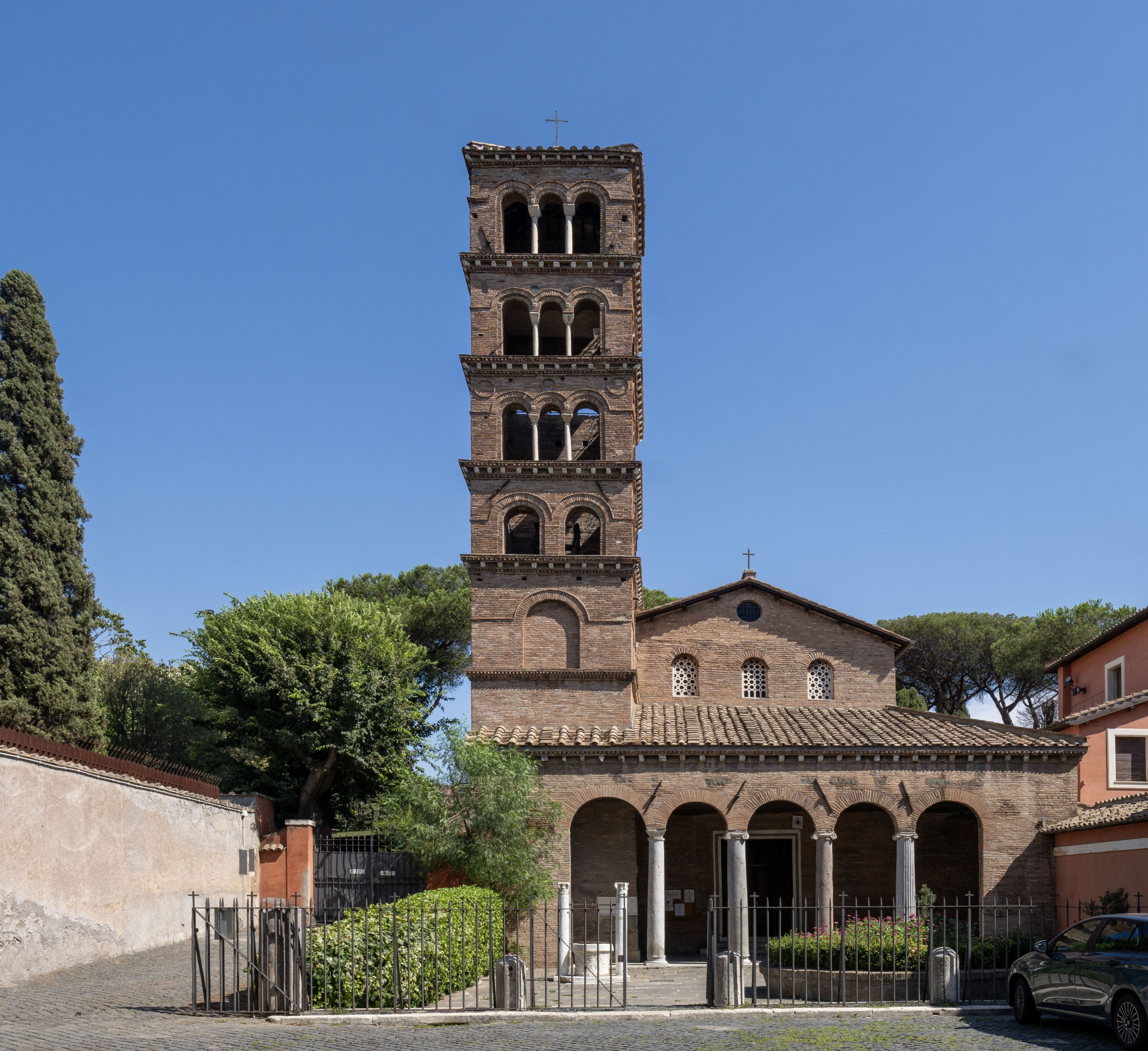
- The church
- Click on the map for a fullscreen view
- 41°52′38″N 12°30′7″E
- Location: Rome
- Country: Italy
- Denomination: Catholic
- Tradition: Roman Rite
- Religious institute: Rosminians

History
- Status: Titular church, General Curia of the Institute of Charity

Architecture
- Architect: Raffaele Fagnoni
- Architectural type: Church
- Style: Baroque
- Groundbreaking: c. AD 493–496

Specifications
- Materials: brick

Administration
- District: Lazio
- Province: Rome

San Giovanni a Porta Latina (Italian: "Saint John Before the Latin Gate") is a basilica church in Rome, Italy, near the Porta Latina (on the Via Latina) of the Aurelian Wall.

== History ==
According to Tertullian, as quoted by Saint Jerome, in the year 92, St John the Evangelist survived martyrdom at Rome under the Emperor Domitian by being immersed in a vat of boiling oil, from which he emerged unharmed. He was later exiled to the island of Patmos. This event was traditionally said to have occurred at the Latin Gate (located on the southern portion of the Roman wall). The nearby chapel of San Giovanni in Oleo is said to be on the very spot. The event was referred to in the Roman Martyrology, which was begun in the seventh century, though the event was celebrated before then. A feast in the Roman calendar also celebrated the event until 1960, when Pope John XXIII removed most of the secondary feasts for a saint. The black-letter day of S. John Evang. ante portam Latinam is still marked in the Anglican Book of Common Prayer on May 6. The feast is likewise celebrated by the Personal Ordinariate of Our Lady of Walsingham.

The tradition for the building of the Basilica of St. John at the Latin Gate places its construction during the pontificate of Pope Gelasius I (492–496). This is consistent with the oldest of the roof tiles, which have the imprint of a taxation stamp for the Ostrogoth King and ruler of Italy Theodoric the Great (reigned 493–526). One of these ancient roof tiles is now used in the Basilica as a lectern.

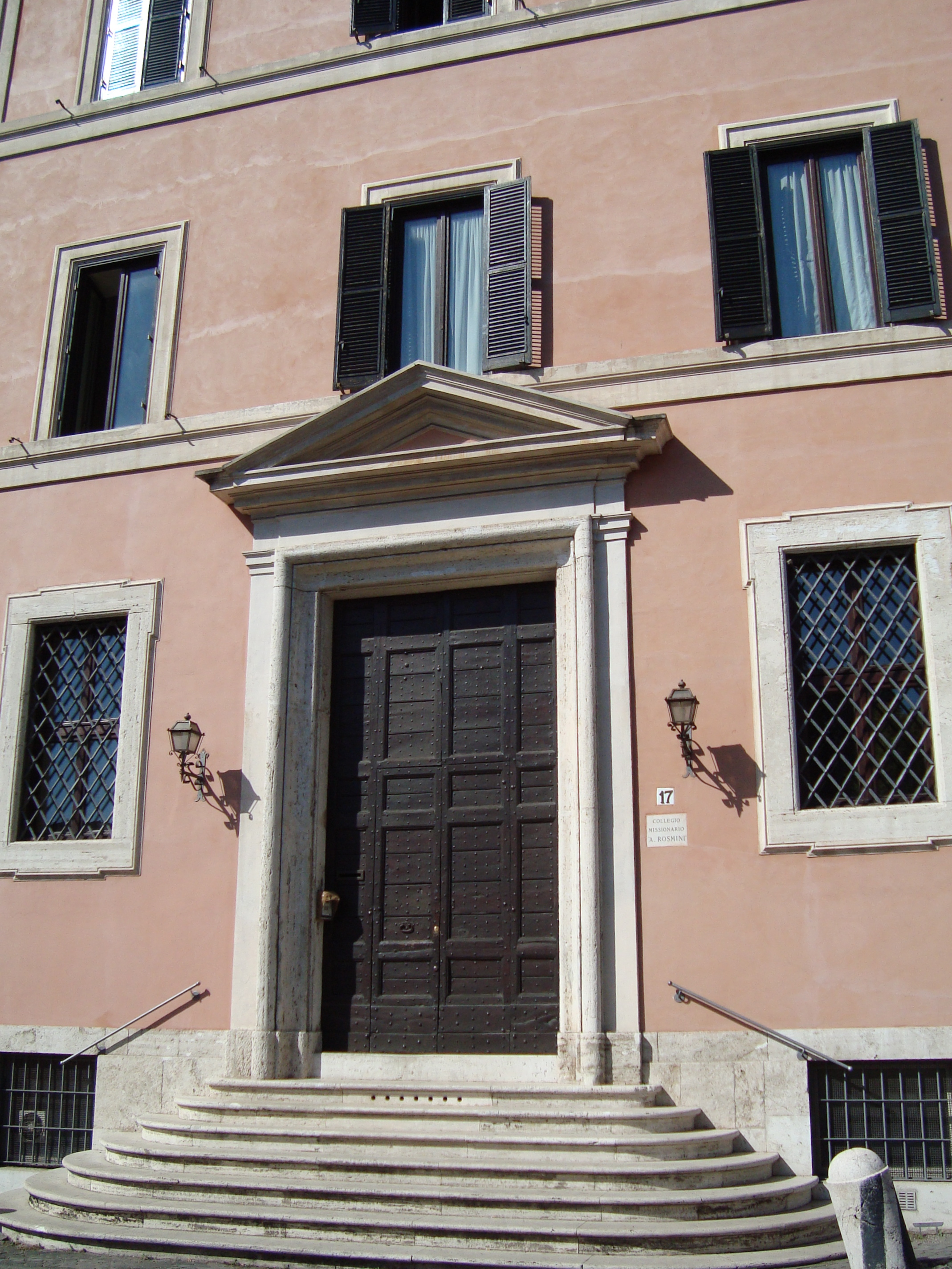
Entrance to the adjacent Collegio Rosmini

In the 8th century, the Basilica was restored by Pope Adrian I, and later the bell-tower and portico were added, and at the end of the 12th century the Basilica was reconsecrated by Pope Celestine III. In the 16th and 17th centuries, a Baroque ceiling and other Baroque features were added to the interior. In the years 1940–1941, the Baroque features were removed and the Basilica was returned to a more primitive simplicity. This last renovation was carried out by the Rosminian Fathers, who, in 1938, were given care of the Basilica and the nearby building, where they opened the Collegio Missionario Antonio Rosmini which houses their International House of Studies.

This church is allegedly the site of one of the earliest same-sex weddings in western Europe. Michel de Montaigne, a French philosopher and prominent essayist of the 16th century, noted in his journal that,

On my return from Saint Peter's I met a man who informed me...that on this same day [March 18, 1581] the [Holy Week] station was at San Giovanni Porta Latina, in which church a few years before certain Portuguese had entered into a strange brotherhood. They married one another, male to male, at Mass, with the same ceremonies with which we perform our marriages, read the same marriage gospel service, and then went to bed and lived together. The Roman wits said that because in the other conjunction, of male and female, this circumstance of marriage alone makes it legitimate, it had seemed to these sharp folk that this other action would become equally legitimate if they authorized it with ceremonies and mysteries of the Church.

== Description ==
The entrance to the Basilica is fronted by a small square with an 8th-century well-head, nearly reproducing the aspect of the Basilica that would have been seen at the reconsecration by Pope Celestine III in the 12th century.

The portico (or porch) of the Basilica is supported by four re-used classical columns (each of a different marble) supporting five arches. The main door is framed with a simple mosaic of red and green porphyry.

The well-head, from the time of Pope Adrian I, has a double row circular design around its barrel and a Latin inscription completely around its crown:

IN NOMINE PAT[RIS] ET FILII ET SPI[RITUS SANT]I "In the name of the Father, of the Son, and of the Holy Spirit"

and a quote from the Book of Isaiah:

OMN[E]S SITIE[NTES VENITE AD AQUAS] "All you who are thirsty come to the water" (Isaiah 55:1

and the name of the stone-carver:

EGO STEFANUS "I [am] Stephen".

The interior of the Basilica is divided into three naves, divided by two rows of columns on which rest semi-circular arches. The two columns closest to the sanctuary are of white marble with deep fluting. The other columns are of various types of marble and granite, capped with a diverse collection of Ionic capitals. The central nave terminates with a half-hexagon apse. Each of the three sides of the apse opens with a large window filled with honey-coloured onyx.

Occupying the ledge of the central window is a carved wooden crucifixion scene including Saint John the Evangelist and the Blessed Virgin Mary. In front of the altar is a mosaic pavement in Cosmatesque style. The geometric pattern of red and green porphyry is framed in white marble (as well are reused fragments of white marble with Latin lettering) is thought to have been created before the 12th century. Inserted in the front step of the altar, is the titulus of the basilica, of ancient origin, discovered during the renovations of 1940:

TIT. S. IOANNIS ANTE PORTAM LA[TINAM]

In the years 1913–1915, the recently discovered frescoes were restored above the main altar. After this work, another search along the face of the central nave revealed the presence of a full circle of medieval frescoes. The restoration of these frescos was completed with the full restoration of the Basilica in 1940–1941. The central nave is decorated with about 50 scenes representing the Old and New Testaments, from the creation of the world to the glorious apocalypse of the New Jerusalem. The frescoes were executed by several artists under the direction of one master.

== List of Cardinal Priests ==
- Giovanni Domenico de Cupis 7 June 1517 – 17 August 1524; 17 August 1524 – 3 September 1529
- Mercurino Arborio di Gattinara 23 September 1529 – 5 June 1530
- Gabriel de Gramont 23 June 1530 – 9 January 1530
- Juan Pardo de Tavera 27 April 1530 – 1 August 1545
- Francisco Mendoza de Bobadilla 28 February 1550 – 28 February 1550
- Jean Reuman Suavius 13 January 1556 – 26 April 1560
- Girolamo di Corregio 3 June 1561 – 5 May 1562
- Flavio Orsini 15 May 1565 – 17 November 1565; 17 November 1565 – 16 May 1581
- Gabriele Paleotti 7 September 1565 – 30 January 1566; 30 January 1566 – 5 July 1572
- Alessandro Crivelli 8 February 1566 – 1568; 1568 – 20 November 1570
- Gian Girolamo Albani 20 November 1570 – 15 April 1591
- Ottavio Paravicini 20 November 1591 – 9 March 1592
- Alfonso Visconti 7 March 1599 – 24 January 1600
- Bernard Maciejowski 7 January 1605 – 19 January 1608
- Francesco Vendramin 28 November 1616 – 7 October 1619
- Guido Bentivoglio d'Aragona 17 May 1621 – 26 October 1622
- Francesco Cherubini 16 December 1647 – 24 April 1656
- Francesco Paolucci 23 April 1657 – 9 July 1661
- Cesare Maria Antonio Rasponi 15 March 1661 – 21 November 1675
- Mario Alberizzi 23 March 1676 – 29 September 1680
- Stefano Agostini 22 September 1681 – 21 March 1683
- Jan Kazimierz Denhoff 30 September 1686 – 20 June 1697
- Sperello Sperelli 3 February 1700 – 22 March 1710
- Pier Marcellino Corradini 21 November 1721 – 11 September 1726; 11 September 1726 – 10 April 1734
- Pietro Maria Pieri 12 April 1734 – 27 January 1743
- Francesco Landi Pietra 13 September 1745 – 11 February 1757
- Ludovico Gualtierio de' Gualtieri 24 March 1760 – 24 July 1761
- Simone Buonaccorsi 22 August 1763 – 27 April 1776
- Hyacinthe Sigismond Gerdil 30 March 1778 – 20 September 1784
- Antonio Dugnani 12 September 1784 – 23 December 1801
- Jean-Baptist de Belloy Morangle 1 February 1805 – 10 June 1808
- Camillo de Simone 23 September 1816 – 2 January 1818
- Remigio Crescini 5 July 1830 – 20 July 1830
- Giacomo Luigi Brignole 23 June 1834 – 13 September 1838; 13 September 1838 – 11 June 187
- Camillo di Pietro 15 April 1859 – 20 September 1867
- Joseph-Hippolyte Guibert 15 June 1874 – 8 July 1886
- Benoit-Marie Langénieux 17 March 1887 – 1 January 1905
- Gregorio Maria Aguirre y Garcia 19 December 1907 – 10 October 1913
- Felix von Hartmann 28 May 1914 – 11 November 1919
- Edmund Dalbor 18 December 1919 – 13 February 1926
- Joseph MacRory 19 December 1929 – 13 October 1945
- Joseph Frings 22 February 1946 – 17 December 1978
- Franciszek Macharski 30 June 1979 – 2 August 2016
- Renato Corti 19 November 2016 – 12 May 2020
- Adalberto Martínez Flores 27 August 2022 – present

== Bibliography ==
- Giovanni Mario Crescimbeni, L'istoria della chiesa di St Giovanni avanti Porta Latina (Roma: A. de Rossi, 1716).

Preceded by Santa Francesca Romana, Rome	Landmarks of Rome; San Giovanni a Porta Latina	Succeeded by San Giovanni dei Fiorentini
