= Marco Battaglini =

18th-century Roman Catholic bishop

Most Reverend Marco Battista Battaglini
- Bishop of Cesena
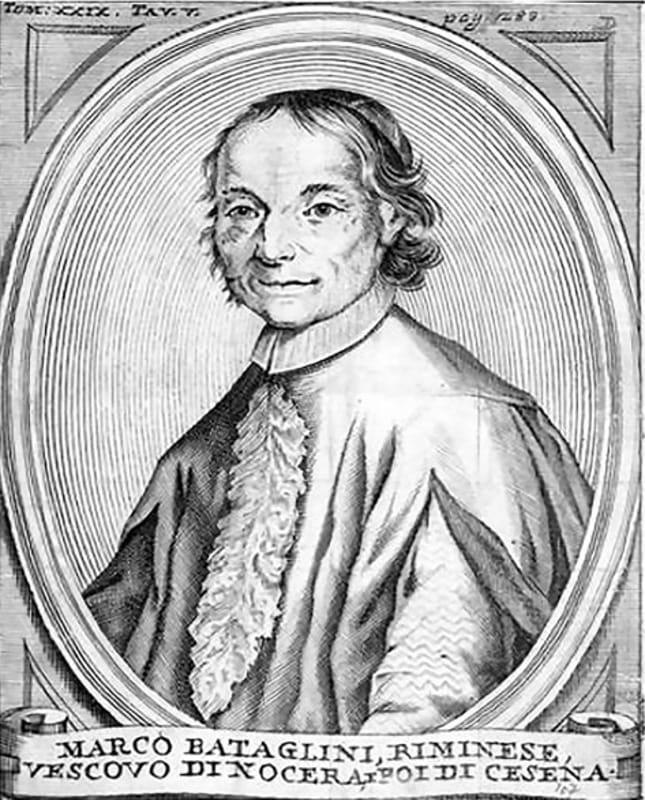
- portrait of Battaglini marco
- Church: Catholic Church
- Diocese: Diocese of Cesena
- In office: 1716–1717
- Predecessor: Giovanni Fontana
- Successor: Francesco Saverio Guicciardi
- Previous post: Bishop of Nocera Umbra (1690–1716)

Orders
- Consecration: 7 May 1690 by Gasparo Carpegna

Personal details
- Born: 25 Mar 1646 Rimini, Italy
- Died: 19 Sep 1717 (age 71) Cesena, Italy

Marco Battista Battaglini (25 March 1645 – 19 September 1717) was an Italian jurist and bishop, known as a historian of the church councils. He served as Bishop of Cesena (1716–1717) and Bishop of Nocera Umbra (1690–1716).

== Biography ==
Marco Battista Battaglini was born on 25 Mar 1646 in Rimini, Italy. He studied law at Cesena, both civil and ecclesiastical, and at the age of sixteen, he obtained the degree of Doctor of Civil and Canon Law. After some years of service in the civil administration of the Papal States, he entered the priesthood. On 17 Apr 1690, he was appointed Bishop of Nocera Umbra by Pope Alexander VIII. On 7 May 1690, he was consecrated bishop by Gasparo Carpegna, Cardinal-Priest of Santa Maria in Trastevere.

On 8 Jun 1716, he was transferred by Pope Clement XI to the Diocese of Cesena.

He served as Bishop of Cesena until his death on 19 Sep 1717 at Cesena.

== Works ==
His principal works are:

- "Il legista filosofo" (Rome, 1680), or the man of law as a philosopher;
- "Istoria universale di tutti i concilii" (Venice, 1686, 1689, 1696, 1714). The first edition contained the history of 475 councils; in subsequent edition 403 more were added. In a supplement was a catalogue of all the ancient and contemporary episcopal sees.
- "Annali del sacerdozio e dell' imperio intorno all' intero secolo decimo settimo" (Venice, 1701–11; Ancona, 1742), or history of the world during the seventeenth century in the form of annals.

== External links and additional sources ==
- Cheney, David M. "Diocese of Nocera Umbra-Gualdo Tadino". Catholic-Hierarchy.org. (for Chronology of Bishops) ^{[self-published]}
- Chow, Gabriel. "Diocese of Nocera Umbra-Gualdo Tadino (Italy)". GCatholic.org. (for Chronology of Bishops) ^{[self-published]}
- Cheney, David M. "Diocese of Cesena-Sarsina". Catholic-Hierarchy.org. (for Chronology of Bishops) ^{[self-published]}
- Chow, Gabriel. "Diocese of Cesena-Sarsina (Italy)". GCatholic.org. (for Chronology of Bishops) ^{[self-published]}

Catholic Church titles
Preceded by Giovanni Battista Amati	Bishop of Nocera Umbra; 1690–1716	Succeeded by Alessandro Borgia
Preceded by Giovanni Fontana	Bishop of Cesena; 1716–1717	Succeeded by Francesco Saverio Guicciardi
