= Camillo Gualandi =

Roman Catholic prelate

Most Reverend Camillo Gualandi
- Bishop of Cesena
- Church: Catholic Church
- Diocese: Diocese of Cesena
- In office: 1588–1609
- Predecessor: Odoardo Gualandi
- Successor: Michelangelo Tonti

Orders
- Consecration: 25 April 1588 by Giulio Antonio Santorio

Personal details
- Died: 11 February 1609 Cesena, Italy

Camillo Gualandi (died 11 February 1609) was a Roman Catholic prelate who served as Bishop of Cesena (1588–1609).

== Biography ==
On 30 March 1588, Camillo Gualandi was appointed during the papacy of Pope Sixtus V as Bishop of Cesena. On 25 April 1588, he was consecrated bishop by Giulio Antonio Santorio, Cardinal-Priest of San Bartolomeo all'Isola, with Agapito Bellomo, Bishop of Caserta, and Pietro Ridolfi (bishop), Bishop of Venosa, serving as co-consecrators. He served as Bishop of Cesena until his death on 11 February 1609.

His uncle was Odoardo Gualandi.

== External links and additional sources ==
- Cheney, David M. "Diocese of Cesena-Sarsina". Catholic-Hierarchy.org. (for Chronology of Bishops) ^{[self-published]}
- Chow, Gabriel. "Diocese of Cesena-Sarsina (Italy)". GCatholic.org. (for Chronology of Bishops) ^{[self-published]}

Catholic Church titles
Preceded by Odoardo Gualandi	Bishop of Cesena; 1588–1609	Succeeded by Michelangelo Tonti
