= Enzio =

Enzio (Italian: [ˈɛntsjo]) may refer to

- Enzio, legitimate son of Manfred of Sicily by his wife Helena; he was confined to prison his entire life
- Enzio Boldewijn (born 1992), Dutch footballer
- Enzio d'Antonio (1925–2019), Italian Roman Catholic bishop and archbishop
- Enzio von Pfeil (born 1953), German economist
- Enzio Reuter (1867–1951), Finnish entomologist
