= Fazio Giovanni Santori =

Italian Roman Catholic bishop and cardinal

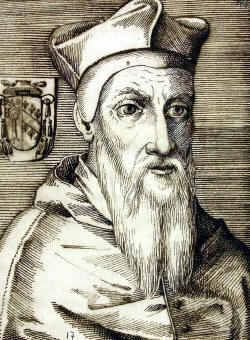
Fazio Giovanni Santori

Fazio Giovanni Santori (1447 – 22 March 1510) (called the Cardinal of Cesena) was an Italian Roman Catholic bishop and cardinal.

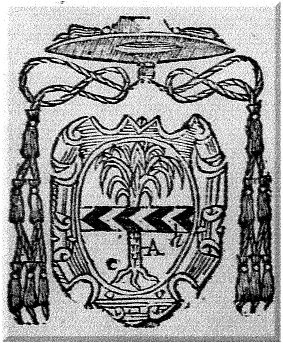
Coat of arms of Cardinal Fazio Giovanni Santori

== Biography ==
Fazio Giovanni Santori was born in Viterbo in 1447. He was educated at the University of Perugia.

Early in his career, he was a cleric in Viterbo. In 1485, he became a canon of St. Lambert's Cathedral, Liège. He was the pedagogus of Giuliano della Rovere, the future cardinal and future Pope Julius II; when della Rovere became a cardinal, he took Santori into his household. He served as a datary from November 1503 to December 1505. He was the dean of the Apostolic Camera in 1503.

On 22 July 1504 he was elected Bishop of Cesena. He subsequently occupied that see until his death.

Pope Julius II made him a cardinal priest in the consistory of 1 December 1505. He received the red hat and the titular church of Santa Sabina on 17 December 1505. He was the apostolic administrator of the see of Pamplona from 17 September 1507 until his death.

He died in Rome on 22 March 1510. He was initially buried in San Lorenzo in Lucina; his remains were later transferred to St. Peter's Basilica.

Catholic Church titles
Preceded by Pietro Menzi	Bishop of Cesena; 1405–1510	Succeeded by Cristoforo Spiriti
Preceded by Francisco Lloris y de Borja	Cardinal-Priest of Santa Sabina; 1505–1510	Succeeded by René de Prie
Preceded by César de Borja	Administrator of Pamplona; 1507–1510	Succeeded by Amanieu d'Albret
