= Mario Alberizzi =

Roman Catholic prelate

Most Reverend Mario Alberizzi
- Cardinal Priest of San Giovanni a Porta Latina
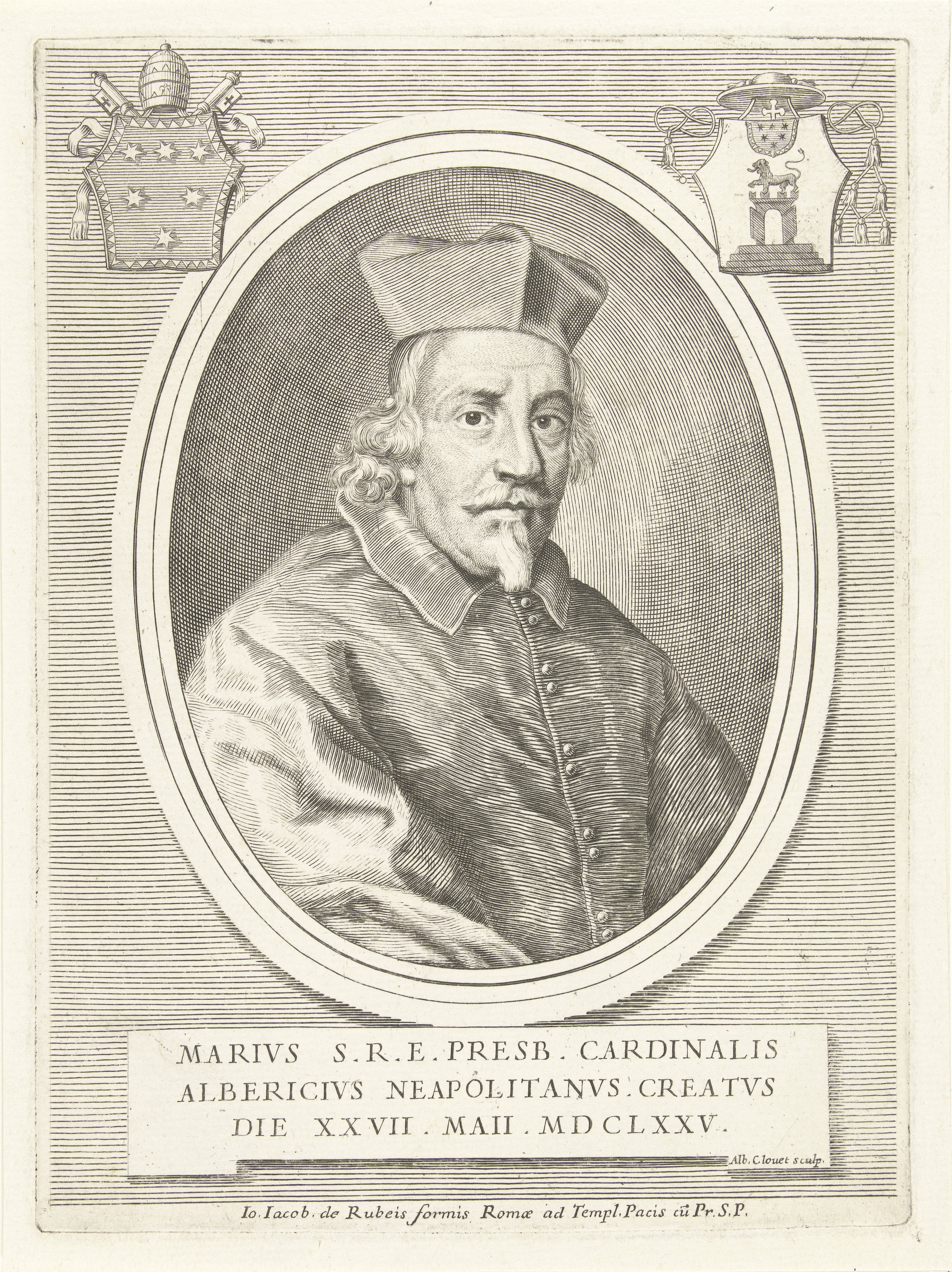
- Church: Catholic Church
- In office: 1675–1680
- Predecessor: Cesare Maria Antonio Rasponi
- Successor: Stefano Agostini (cardinal)
- Previous posts: Apostolic Nuncio to Austria (1671–1675); Archbishop (Personal Title) of Tivoli (1676–1679)

Orders
- Consecration: 25 January 1671 by Federico Borromeo (iuniore)
- Created cardinal: 27 May 1675
- Rank: Cardinal Priest

Personal details
- Born: 29 December 1609 Salve, Italy
- Died: 29 September 1680 (aged 70) Rome, Italy

Mario Alberizzi (1609–1680) was a Roman Catholic prelate who served as Cardinal Priest of San Giovanni a Porta Latina (1675–1680), Archbishop (Personal Title) of Tivoli (1676–1679), and Apostolic Nuncio to Austria (1671–1675).

== Biography ==
Mario Alberizzi was born on 29 December 1609 in Salve, Italy, to a noble family, the son of Giovanni Alberizzi, the prince of Vetrana, and Giulia Farnese. His last name is also listed as Albrizj, Alberici, Albericius and Albericci. He belongs to a family with several distinguished cardinals including his maternal uncle, Cardinal Odoardo Farnese (installed 1591), and Cardinal Taddeo Luigi dal Verme (installed 1695). He studied law in Rome where he earned a doctorate in canon and civil law and a master's in theology.

After his ordination as a priest, he was appointed in 1638 as Referendary of the Tribunals of the Apostolic Signature of Justice and of Grace. From 1646 to 1650, he served as the governor of the city of Ancona where during a famine, he sold all his possessions to feed the poor. In 1657, he was appointed Canon of the patriarchal Vatican basilica; and from 1657 to 1664, he served as Secretary of the Sacred Congregation of Propaganda Fide. In 1659, he was appointed Voter of the Tribunal of the Apostolic Signature of Grace. In 1664, he was named Voter of the Tribunal of the Apostolic Signature of Grace and Secretary of the S.C. of Bishops and Regulars. In 1669, he was named as canon theologian. He also served as Consultor of the Supreme S.C. of the Roman and Universal Inquisition.

On 19 January 1671, he was appointed during the papacy of Pope Clement X as Titular Archbishop of Neocaesarea in Ponto. On 25 January 1671, he was consecrated bishop by Cardinal Federico Borromeo (iuniore), with Alessandro Crescenzi, Titular Patriarch of Alessandria, and Giacomo Altoviti, Titular Patriarch of Antioch, serving as co-consecrators. On 2 February 1671, he was appointed as Assistant at the Pontifical Throne; and as Apostolic Nuncio to Austria where he served until 1675.

On 27 May 1675, he was named by Pope Clement X as cardinal priest and received the title of San Giovanni a Porta Latina on 23 March 1676.

On 22 June 1676, he was appointed during the papacy of Pope Clement X as Archbishop (Personal Title) of Tivoli. As cardinal, he participated in the conclave of 1676 which elected Pope Innocent XI. He served as Bishop of Tivoli until his resignation on 4 September 1679.

He died on 29 September 1680 in Rome and was buried in the chapel of the Basicilica Beata Vergine Maria. He donated his library to the S.C. of Propaganda Fide.

== Episcopal succession ==
Episcopal succession of Mario Alberizzi

While bishop, he was the principal consecrator of:

- Aloysius Bevilacqua, Titular Patriarch of Alexandria (1676);
- Antonio de Martini, Bishop of Sagone (1678); and
- Andrea Massarenghi, Bishop of Massa Lubrense (1678).

== See also ==
- Catholic Church in Italy

Catholic Church titles
Preceded by Antonio Pignatelli del Rastrello	Apostolic Nuncio to Austria; 1671–1675	Succeeded by Francesco Buonvisi
Preceded by Federico Sforza	Archbishop (Personal Title) of Tivoli; 1676–1679	Succeeded by Galeazzo Marescotti
Preceded by Cesare Maria Antonio Rasponi	Cardinal Priest of San Giovanni a Porta Latina; 1675–1680	Succeeded by Stefano Agostini (cardinal)
