= Odoardo Gualandi =

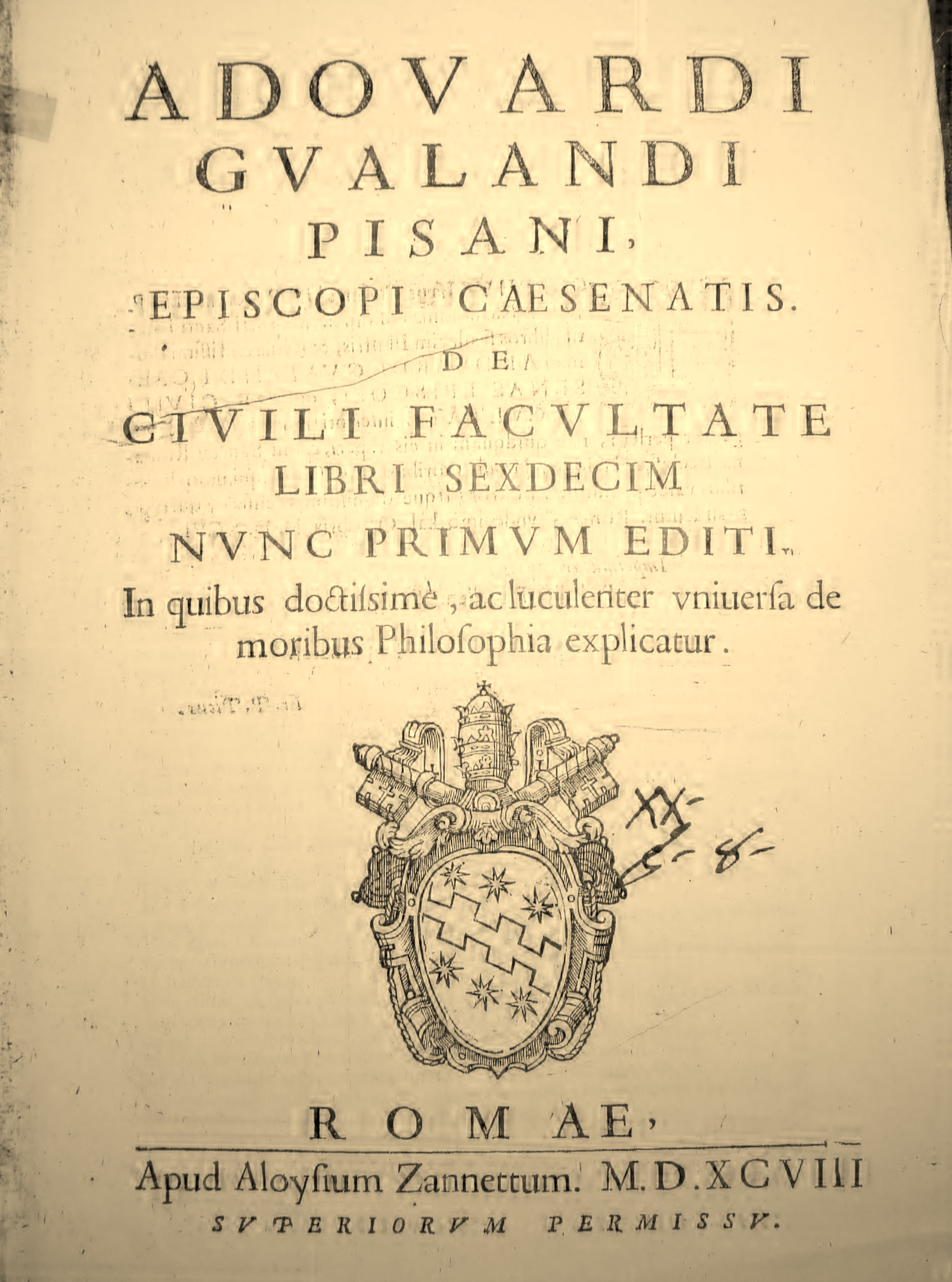
Titlepage of De civili facultate, Gualandi's main philosophical work

Odoardo Gualandi descended from an old and famous patrician family from Pisa. At the University of Bologna he graduated summa cum laude in civil and canon law.

== Career ==
Gualandi was the private secretary of Cardinal Alfonso Carafa, Archbishop of Naples. In 1557, Pope Paul IV named him a Canon of the collegiate churches of Saints Stephen and Saint Felix in Aquileia.

From 1557 till 1588 he was Bishop of Cesena in northern Italy. In that capacity Gualandi organized several synods. The synod in 1582 resulted in his first publication, Constitutiones, et decreta condita ab illustri...Adoardo Gualando...Caesenae. 1584. In 1588 Gualandi retired and was succeeded as Bishop of Cesena by his nephew Camillo Gualandi.

During his retirement he wrote his only known philosophical treatise, De civili facultate Libri XVI. It was published by his nephew in 1598, i.e. a year after his death in Rome, 17 March 1597. The treatise shows Gualandi as an eclectic Aristotelian who attracted attention not as an original thinker but for the way he organized the material in his explanation of ethics and politics. Gualandi had a reputation for clear explanation of moral philosophy in general, and that of Aristotle in particular. His reputation as a teacher lasted till the beginning of the eighteenth century. Since then his name and work have passed into forgetfulness.

== Bibliography ==
- Braschio, J.B. - Memoriae Caesenates sacrae et profanae. Romae. 1728
- Gabrielis Naudaei Bibliographia politica. Venetiis. 1633
- Grassi, Rainieri Descrizione storica e artistica di Pisa. Parte storica. Pisa. 1836
- Gualandi, Adoardi De civili facultate libri XVI... In quibus doctissimè, ac luculenter universa de moribus Philosophia explicatur. Romae. apud Aloysium, Zannettum. 1598
- Prosperi, Ranieri Discorso Accademico Sull' Istoria Letteraria Pisana. Pisa. 1787

== See also ==
- Renaissance philosophy
- Aristotelian ethics
- Gualandi
- Camillo Gualandi
- Gualandi
