= Francesco Landi =

His Eminence Francesco Landi
- Prefect of the Congregation of the Index
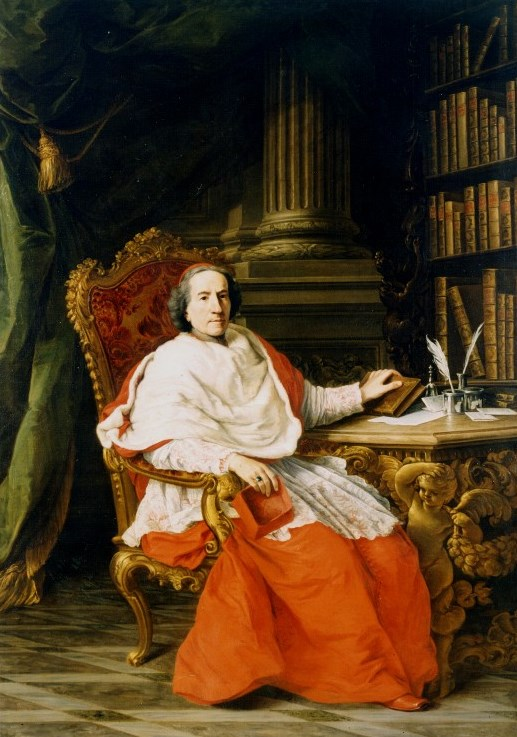
- Church: Roman Catholic
- In office: 1755–1757
- Other post: Cardinal-Priest of San Giovanni a Porta Latina (1745–57)
- Previous posts: Camerlengo of Sacred College of Cardinals (1754–55); Cardinal-Priest of Sant'Onofrio (1744–45); Archbishop of Benevento (1741–52)

Orders
- Ordination: 8 September 1741
- Consecration: 12 November 1741 by Pope Benedict XIV
- Created cardinal: 9 September 1743 by Pope Benedict XIV
- Rank: Cardinal-Priest

Personal details
- Born: 9 July 1682 Piacenza, Duchy of Parma and Piacenza
- Died: 11 February 1757 (aged 74) Rome, Papal States
- Buried: Santa Maria in Campitelli

Francesco Landi (9 July 1682 – 11 February 1757) was an eighteenth century archbishop and cardinal. He is also known as Francesco Landi Pietra after his father's adoption by Count Cesare Pietra di Roncarolo.

== Biography ==
Landi was the fourth child of Count Odoardo Landi and Elisabetta Lampugnani, minor nobility from Piacenza. He studied in Rome at the Pontifical Ecclesiastical Academy and the Sapienza University of Rome, where he graduated in utroque jure. After graduation, he became ajutante de studio to Cardinal Giuseppe Renato Imperiali in the Papal conclave, 1721. Francesco Farnese, Duke of Parma sent him as his ambassador in Paris at the court of the Duke of Orleans, Philippe II, regent of France on behalf of the then still underage Louis XV of France. He found favour with the Count and acted as his counselor. He decided to return to Rome and he became the legal secretary of the Supreme Tribunal of the Apostolic Signatura on 26 March 1733. In 1736 he became secretary of the "Sacred Congregation for the Discipline of the Regulars" and consultor of the Supreme Sacred Congregation of the Roman and Universal Inquisition.

He was ordained priest on 8 September 1741 and ten days later he was appointed Archbishop of Benevento and consecrated by Pope Benedict XIV on 12 November. He often attended his diocese and worked to restore and beautify the Cathedral of Benevento.

Within the consistory of 9 September 1743, Benedict XIV appointed him cardinal, sending him the red biretta with an apostolic brief of 20 September 1743. He received the title of Cardinal Priest of San Onofrio on 15 June 15, 1744 but left that office for that of San Giovanni a Porta Latina on 13 September 1745.

On 17 January 1752 he left the Bishop's chair of Benevento to return to Rome. Here, he was Camerlengo of the Sacred College of Cardinals from 14 January 1754 to 17 February 1755, when he became Prefect of the Sacred Congregation of the Index and for the Correction of the Books of the Oriental Church. He vigorously promoted the cause of beatification of the Venerable Father John Leonardi, founder of the Congregation of Clerks Regular of the Mother of God as Protector of the order.

He was buried in Santa Maria in Campitelli in Rome.
