= Pietro Bonaventura =

Italian Roman Catholic prelate

Most Reverend Pietro Bonaventura
- Bishop of Cesena
- Church: Catholic Church
- Diocese: Diocese of Cesena
- Predecessor: Lorenzo Campeggi
- Successor: Flaminio Marcellino

Orders
- Consecration: 17 April 1629 by Antonio Marcello Barberini

Personal details
- Died: 23 July 1653 Cesena, Italy

Pietro Bonaventura (died 1653) was a Roman Catholic prelate who served as Bishop of Cesena (1629–1653).

== Biography ==
On 14 March 1629, Pietro Bonaventura was appointed during the papacy of Pope Urban VIII as Bishop of Cesena. On 17 April 1629, he was consecrated bishop by Antonio Marcello Barberini, Cardinal-Priest of Sant'Onofrio, serving as co-consecrators. He served as Bishop of Cesena until his death on 23 July 1653.

== External links and additional sources ==
- Cheney, David M. "Diocese of Cesena-Sarsina". Catholic-Hierarchy.org. (for Chronology of Bishops) ^{[self-published]}
- Chow, Gabriel. "Diocese of Cesena-Sarsina (Italy)". GCatholic.org. (for Chronology of Bishops) ^{[self-published]}

Catholic Church titles
Preceded by Lorenzo Campeggi	Bishop of Cesena; 1629–1653	Succeeded by Flaminio Marcellino
