= Cristoforo Spiriti =

Most Reverend Cristoforo Spiriti
- Titular Patriarch of Jerusalem
- Church: Catholic Church
- In office: 1550–1556
- Predecessor: Alessandro Farnese (cardinal)
- Successor: Antonio Elio
- Previous post: Bishop of Cesena (1510–1550)

Personal details
- Died: 5 November 1556

Cristoforo Spiriti (died 5 November 1556) was a Roman Catholic prelate who served as Titular Patriarch of Jerusalem (1550–1556), and Bishop of Cesena (1510–1550).

== Biography ==
On 8 April 1510, Cristoforo Spiriti was appointed during the papacy of Pope Julius II as Bishop of Cesena. On 28 February 1550, he was appointed during the papacy of Pope Julius III as Titular Patriarch of Jerusalem. He served as Patriarch of Jerusalem until his death on 5 November 1556.

== Episcopal succession ==
While bishop, he was the principal co-consecrator of:

- Giovanni Giacomo Barba, Bishop of Teramo (1546);
- Bartolomeo Guidiccioni, Bishop of Teramo (1546); and
- Giulio Canani, Bishop of Adria (1554).

== External links and additional sources ==
- Cheney, David M. "Diocese of Cesena-Sarsina". Catholic-Hierarchy.org. (for Chronology of Bishops) ^{[self-published]}
- Chow, Gabriel. "Diocese of Cesena-Sarsina (Italy)". GCatholic.org. (for Chronology of Bishops) ^{[self-published]}
- Cheney, David M. "Patriarchate of Jerusalem {Gerusalemme}". Catholic-Hierarchy.org. (for Chronology of Bishops) ^{[self-published]}
- Chow, Gabriel. "Patriarchal See of Jerusalem (Israel)". GCatholic.org. (for Chronology of Bishops) ^{[self-published]}

Catholic Church titles
Preceded by Fazio Giovanni Santori	Bishop of Cesena; 1510–1550	Succeeded by Giovanni Battista Spiriti
Preceded by Alessandro Farnese (cardinal)	Titular Patriarch of Jerusalem; 1550–1556	Succeeded by Antonio Elio
