= Stefano Agostini (cardinal) =

Italian cardinal (1614–1683)

His Eminence Stefano Agostini
- Cardinal-Priest of San Giovanni a Porta Latina
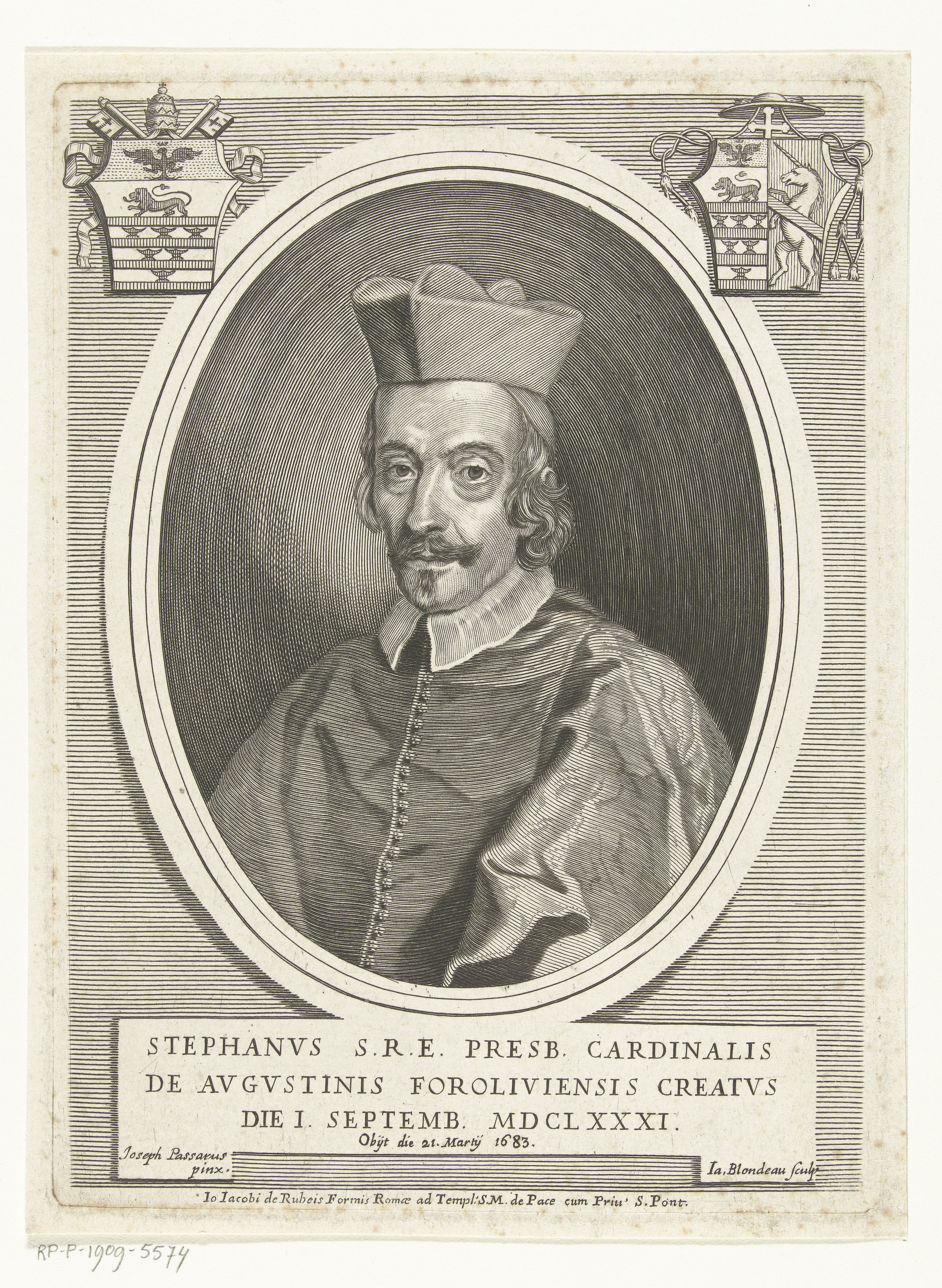
- Church: Catholic Church

Orders
- Consecration: 14 Jun 1671 by Cesare Facchinetti

Personal details
- Born: 1614 Forlì, Italy
- Died: 21 Mar 1683 (age 69)

Stefano Agostini (1614–1683) was a Roman Catholic cardinal.

== Biography ==
On 14 Jun 1671, he was consecrated bishop by Cesare Facchinetti, Bishop of Spoleto, with Mario Fani, Titular Bishop of Cyrene, and Nicola Lepori, Bishop of Saluzzo, serving as co-consecrators.

He graduated in utroque iure from the University of Bologna and moved to Rome, where he had the support of his uncle, Cardinal Francesco Paolucci, and worked in various courts and offices of the Roman Curia.

Titular archbishop of Eraclea di Europa from 3 December 1669, Pope Innocent XI elevated him to the rank of a cardinal presbyter of the title of San Giovanni a Porta Latina in the consistory of 1 September 1681.

He died on 21 March 1683, at the age of 69 and was buried in the church of Santa Maria in Vallicella.

== Episcopal genealogy ==
The episcopal genealogy is:

- Bishop Melchor Soria Vera
- Bishop Diego Castejón Fonseca
- Cardinal Cesare Facchinetti
- Cardinal Stefano Agostini

Catholic Church titles
Preceded by Louis-Henri de Pardaillon de Gondrin	Titular Archbishop of Heraclea in Europa; 1669–1681	Succeeded by Kazimierz Łubieński
Preceded by Mario Alberizzi	Cardinal-Priest of San Giovanni a Porta Latina; 1681–1683	Succeeded by Jan Kazimierz Denhoff
