= Pietro Garlato =

Italian Roman Catholic bishop

- Bishop of Tivoli
- Church: Catholic Church
- Diocese: Diocese of Tivoli
- In office: 30 December 1991 – 5 July 2003
- Predecessor: Lino Esterino Garavaglia
- Successor: Giovanni Paolo Benotto
- Previous posts: Bishop of Palestrina (1986-1991); Apostolic Administrator of Anagni-Alatri (1987-1988)

Orders
- Ordination: 1 July 1951
- Consecration: 19 April 1986 by Ugo Poletti

Personal details
- Born: 10 January 1928 Udine, Province of Udine, Kingdom of Italy
- Died: 29 April 2013 (aged 85) Tivoli, Lazio, Italy

Pietro Garlato (10 January 1928 – 29 April 2013) was the Roman Catholic bishop of the Diocese of Tivoli, Italy.

Ordained to the priesthood in 1951, Garlato was named bishop in 1986 and retired in 2003.
