= Giovanni Fontana (bishop of Cesena) =

Italian Roman Catholic prelate

Most Reverend Giovanni Fontana
- Church: Catholic Church
- In office: 1697–1716
- Predecessor: Jan Kazimierz Denhoff
- Successor: Marco Battista Battaglini

Orders
- Consecration: 9 June 1697 by Bandino Panciatici

Personal details
- Born: 1644 Modigliana, Italy
- Died: 2 March 1716 (aged 71–72) Cesena, Italy

Giovanni Fontana (1644 – 2 March 1716) was a Roman Catholic prelate who served as Bishop of Cesena (1697–1716).

== Biography ==
Giovanni Fontana was born in Modigliana, Italy in 1644. On 3 June 1697, he was appointed during the papacy of Pope Clement VIII as Bishop of Cesena. On 9 June 1697, he was consecrated bishop by Bandino Panciatici, Cardinal-Priest of San Pancrazio, with Miguel Antonio de Benavides y Piedrola, Bishop of Cartagena, and Alessandro Lambert, Bishop of Aosta, serving as co-consecrators. He served as Bishop of Cesena until his death on 2 March 1716.

== External links and additional sources ==
- Cheney, David M. "Diocese of Cesena-Sarsina". Catholic-Hierarchy.org. (for Chronology of Bishops) ^{[self-published]}
- Chow, Gabriel. "Diocese of Cesena-Sarsina (Italy)". GCatholic.org. (for Chronology of Bishops) ^{[self-published]}

Catholic Church titles
Preceded by Jan Kazimierz Denhoff	Bishop of Cesena; 1697–1716	Succeeded by Marco Battista Battaglini
