= Lino Esterino Garavaglia =

Italian Roman Catholic bishop (1927–2020)

Lino Esterino Garavaglia O.F.M. Cap.
- Church: Roman Catholic Church
- Diocese: Roman Catholic Diocese of Cesena-Sarsina
- In office: 5 May 1991 to 3 December 2003
- Predecessor: Luigi Amaducci
- Successor: Antonio Lanfranchi

Orders
- Ordination: 5 December 1954
- Consecration: 2 February 1986 by Lucas Moreira Neves
- Rank: Coadjutor bishop (1986–1987); Bishop of Tivoli (1987–1991); Bishop of Cesena-Sarsina (1991–2003)

Personal details
- Born: 9 September 1927 Mesero, Milan, Italy
- Died: 12 June 2020 (aged 92) Cesena, Italy
- Buried: Mesero, Italy
- Denomination: Roman Catholicism
- Education: University of Milan; University of Leuven; Higher School of the Journalists Association of Upper Italy
- Motto: "In caritate radicati" (Rooted in charity)

Styles of Lino Esterino Garavaglia
- Reference style: His Excellency; The Most Reverend
- Religious style: Bishop

Lino Esterino Garavaglia, OFM Cap. (9 September 1927 – 12 June 2020) was an Italian prelate of the Catholic Church. He was ordained as a priest in 1954, and served in multiple positions in Italy for the next thirty years. From the 1980s to the 2000s he served as the bishop of the dioceses of Tivoli and Cesena-Sarsina.

== Early life ==
Lino Esterino Garavaglia was born on 9 September 1927, in Mesero, Milan, Italy, to Luigi and Davidina Belloli.

== Career ==
=== Ordination ===
On 4 October 1945, Garavaglia joined the Order of Friars Minor Capuchin. He professed on 15 August 1948, and made his solemn vows on 15 August 1951. On 5 December 1954, he was ordained as a priest in the Milan Cathedral.

Garavaglia attended the University of Milan for courses in the Middle-Far East Institute, graduated from the University of Leuven in missiology, and graduated from the Higher School of the Journalists Association of Upper Italy in journalism.

=== Positions ===
On 8 December 1954, the Feast of the Immaculate Conception, he celebrated his first Mass, and Gianna Beretta Molla, who would later be canonized, was present. From 1956 to 1976, Garavaglia served as a provincial secretary, and as national secretary for the missions from 1966 to 1973. From 1969 to 1981, he served as a representative of the religious in the Presbyteral council of the diocese of Milan. In the Lombard Capuchin Province he served as the definitor from 1970 to 1973, and vice-provincial from 1973 to 1979.

In 1978, Garavaglia served as the Italian delegate to the Plenary Council of the Order in Mattlì. From 1979 to 1982, he served as the minister of the Capuchin Province of Lombardy. In 1979, he served as vice-president of the Italian Provincial Superiors Council and later as president in 1981. From 1982 to 1985, he served as the general definitor of the Order of Friars Minor Capuchin.

=== Journalism ===
In 1964, Garavaglia founded the magazine Cammino: annali francescani and served as its director until 1976. From 1968 to 1976, he served as the director of the Continenti magazine.

=== Bishop ===
On 2 February 1986, Garavaglia was appointed as coadjutor bishop of Tivoli. He was consecrated in Rome on 8 March by Cardinal Lucas Moreira Neves. On 25 June 1987, he formally took over the diocese of Tivoli from Guglielmo Giaquinta. Pietro Garlato took over the diocese from him on 30 December 1991.

On 25 March 1991, he was appointed by Pope John Paul II to serve as the bishop of the diocese of Cesena-Sarsina to succeed Luigi Amaducci. On 5 May, he was installed as bishop and served until his resignation on 9 September 2002. On 3 December 2003, he announced that Antonio Lanfranchi would succeed him and granted him the pastoral care on 25 January 2004.

== Later life ==
After leaving his position as bishop of Cesena-Sarsina he was given the title of emeritus bishop. On 12 June 2020, Garavaglia died in a nursing home in Cesena, Italy, at the age of 92. Following his death he was praised by Cesena mayor Enzo Lattuca as an "important point of reference" to the community.
