= Diocese of Tivoli =

Latin Catholic ecclesiastical jurisdiction in Italy

Coordinates: 41°57′N 12°48′E

Diocese of Tivoli Dioecesis Tiburtina

Catholic
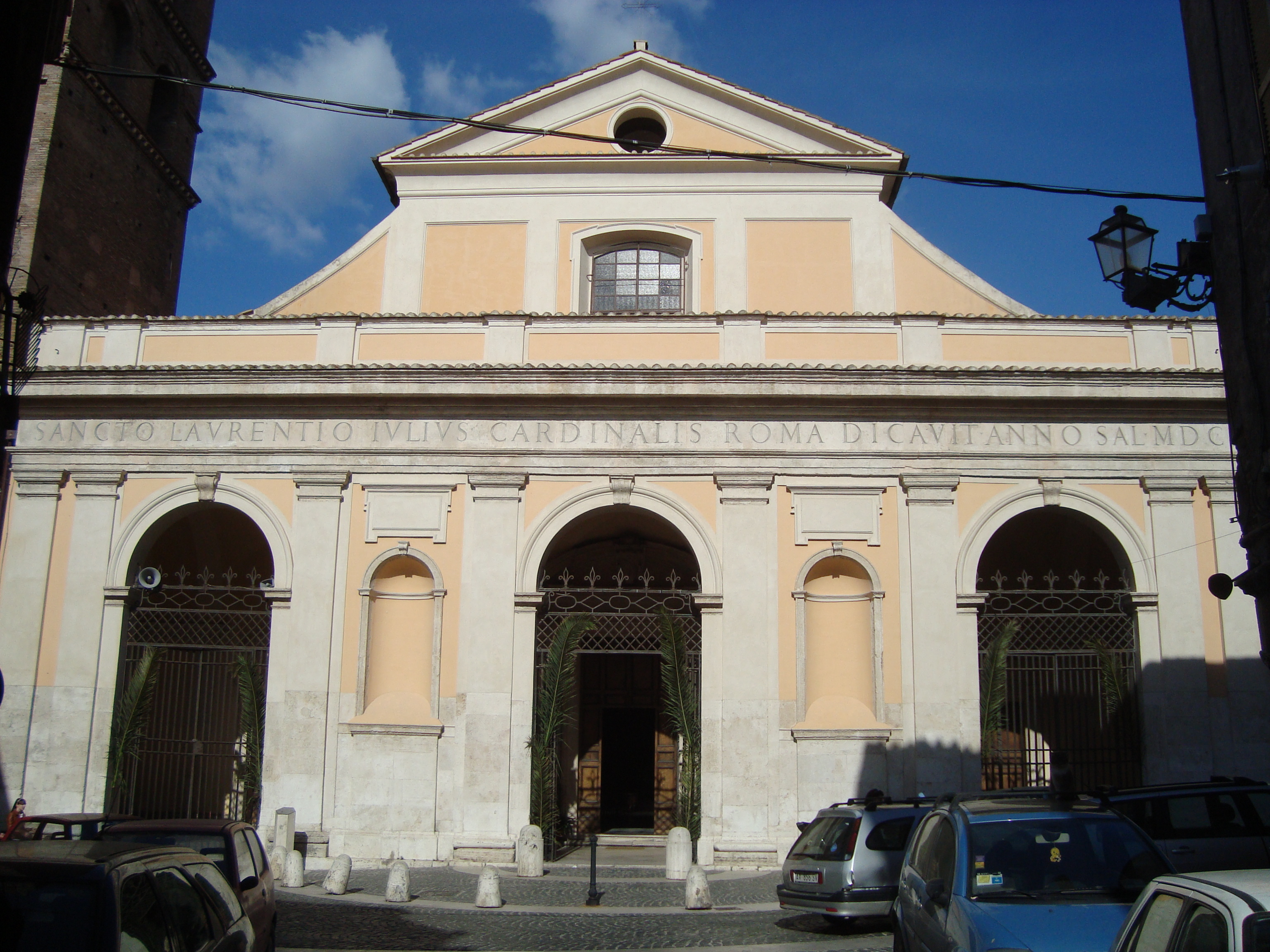
- Tivoli Cathedral

Location
- Country: Italy
- Ecclesiastical province: Exempt, immediately subject to the Holy See

Statistics
- Area: 892 km^{2} (344 sq mi)
- Population: Total; Catholics: (as of 2022); 200,468 ▲; 184,210 ▲ (91.9%)
- Parishes: 84

Information
- Denomination: Catholic Church
- Sui iuris church: Latin Church
- Rite: Roman Rite
- Established: 4th century?
- Cathedral: Tivoli Cathedral
- Secular priests: 85 (diocesan) ▼42 (Religious Orders) ▲17 Permanent Deacons ▲

Current leadership
- Pope: Leo XIV
- Bishop: Mauro Parmeggiani

Website
- www.diocesitivoli.it

The Diocese of Tivoli (Latin: Dioecesis Tiburtina) is a Latin Church ecclesiastical territory or diocese of the Catholic Church in Latium, Italy, which has existed since the 4th century. In 2002 territory was added to it from the Territorial Abbey of Subiaco. The diocese is exempt from metropolitan jurisdiction, and is immediately subject to the Holy See.

== History ==
Tibur (Tivoli) was a small city on the Anio River, some 17 miles east of Rome, on the Via Tiburtina. The tradition is that the diocese was founded in the time of Pope Hyginus (c. 138–142), It is without foundation. Louis Duchesne finds no indication of a diocese of Tivoli before 366.

The city was strongly fortified by Belisarius in the Gothic War, but almost destroyed by Totila in 540. After the Lombard invasion it was in the power of the Byzantines. Tibur (Tivoli) is named in the privilegium of the Emperor Louis the Pious in 817, as forming part of the patrimony of St. Peter. Tivoli had a count, representing the emperor. In August 916, Pope John X won a victory, personally leading his coalition forces against the Saracens at the Battle of the Garigliano, some 35 miles east of Terracina.

=== Extent and content of the diocese ===
The archives of the diocese of Tivoli and the archives of the City of Tivoli are extensive. A document of 1402 lists all the properties owned by the churches of the diocese of Tivoli.

On 21 December 973, Pope Benedict VI confirmed the grants of privileges, persons and property to the diocese of Tivoli by Popes Innocent I (407–417), Nicholas I (858–867), John VIII (872–882), Leo VII (936–939), and Marinus II (945). Pope John XV issued a similar privilege on 23 February 993, and John XIX on 12 June 1029.

Bishop Maifred (or Manfred) of Tivoli) was in Rome, and subscribed the Act of Confirmation of the election of Pope Calixtus II, probably in February 1119.

In April 1082, the Emperor Henry IV and his Antipope Clement III (Guibert of Ravenna) visited Tivoli for some days, and devastated the countryside. In 1101, the city of Tivoli revolted against the Emperor Otto III, who had attempted to impose a rector on them. They were besieged by the emperor, and, persuaded by Pope Silvester II, they finally submitted; some of their walls were torn down and hostages taken.

Tivoli rebelled at times against the popes, under Emperor Henry IV (1084–1105) and Emperor Henry V, and against Pope Innocent II (1130–1143); at other times it fought against the Roman rebels, as under Pope Eugenius III and Pope Adrian IV. Pope Eugenius, who had been an exile at Segni for nearly a year in 1151 and 1152, was given hospitality by Bishop Otto in 1153 and died at Tivoli on 8 July 1153.

In the 13th century the Senate of Rome succeeded, under Pope Innocent IV, in 1254, in imposing a tribute on the city, and arrogated to itself the right of appointing a count to govern it in conjunction with the local consuls. The appointment to the office of count, however, became the prerogative of the pope, and the office was held for one year only.

Pope Honorius IV resided in Tivoli during the summer of 1285, from 10 July to 7 October; and during the summer of 1286, from 4 July to 1 October.

In the 14th century Tivoli sided with the Guelphs, and in the Western Schism (1378–1417) supported Pope Urban VI against Pope Clement VII. After his election, Urban had withdrawn to Tivoli. King Ladislaus of Naples (1386–1414) was twice, and later Braccio da Montone once, repulsed from the city in 1417. But Tivoli's strength was undermined by internal factions, in consequence of which Pope Pius II (1458–1464) constructed the fortress which still exists.

The territory passed by purchase, and with the approval of Pope Eugenius IV, to Giovanni Antonio Orsini, Count of Tagliacozzo, on 20 July 1436.

Under Pope Julius II, the Bishop of Tivoli, Angelo Leonini (1499–1509) was serving as ambassador to Venice, with the powers of a legatus a latere. In April 1509, he was staying in Bologna, and on 3 August 1509 he was promoted archbishop of Torres (Sassari) in Sardinia.

Pope Nicholas V issued a bull, in which he annulled the obligation of the bishop and clergy of Tivoli to pay a tax of 100 libri to the city of Rome; on 1 June 1455, Pope Calixtus III revoked the bull of Pope Nicholas. On 28 March 1512, Pope Julius II, in response to formal complaints from the Conservators and other officials of the city of Rome, issued a decree in the form of a bull, "Si Nostrarum civitatum", revoking the powers assumed by the commune of Tivoli, with the encouragement of Cardinal Pietro Isvolies and other protectors, and by the Apostolic Camera, against the financial interests of the city of Rome. Pope Adrian VI (1521–1523) withdrew the city of Tivoli from the jurisdiction of the Roman Senate. He himself had spent time in the summer of 1522 in Tivoli. In 1527 it was sacked by bands of the supporters of the emperor and the Colonna, important archives being destroyed during the attack.

In the war of Pope Paul IV against Spain which began in 1556, Tivoli was again occupied by the Duke of Alba. On 26 September, the city was invested, and on 1 October he seized Vicovaro. In January 1557, it was recovered for the pope by Pietro Strozzi, the papal commander-in-chief.

In 1744, it was occupied by the Austrians.

=== Chapter and cathedral ===
A cathedral was dedicated to the Roman martyr S. Lorenzo at the end of the 8th century.

The cathedral of S. Lorenzo was served by a corporate body called the Chapter. It was headed by four dignities (the Archdeacon, the Archpriest, the Dean, and the Provost) and eleven canons. In 1676, there were 16 canons. Cardinal Giulio Roma (1634–1652) restored the cathedral of S. Lorenzo, and rededicated it in 1645. He also transferred to the cathedral Chapter the archpriest and five canons of the Collegiate Church of S. Peter. He also began the construction of the diocesan seminary.

In 1676, the city of Tivoli had c. 4,000 inhabitants. There were eight parishes in the city, four monasteries of men and two of women.

==== Synods ====
Cardinal Giulio Roma (1634–1652) held a diocesan synod in Tivoli on 18 December 1636. Cardinal Marcello Santacroce (1652–1674) presided over a diocesan synod on 13 June 1658. Cardinal Galeazzo Marescotti (1679–1684) held a diocesan synod in Tivoli on 13 April 1682. Cardinal Placido Pezzancheri (1728–1757) presided over a diocesan synod in the cathedral of S. Lorenzo in Tivoli on 27–29 November 1729.

=== Diocesan reorganization ===
The bishops of Tivoli and the abbots of Subiaco repeatedly clashed over their rights and privileges with regard to the parishes under the control of Subiaco. On 15 December 1638, Pope Urban VIII (Barberini) intervened with the bull "Sacrosanctae militantis ecclesiae," which required the bishop of Tivoli to cede his rights to the disputed churches to the abbot of Subiaco. The Abbot Commendatory of Subiaco at the time was Cardinal Antonio Barberini the Younger, the pope's nephew. The Bishop of Tivoli was Cardinal Giulio Roma.

The Second Vatican Council (1962–1965), in order to ensure that all Catholics received proper spiritual attention, decreed the reorganization of the diocesan structure of Italy and the consolidation of small and struggling dioceses. It also recommended the abolition of anomalous units such as exempt territorial prelatures. On 16 July 2002, it was decreed that the territorial prelature of Subiaco should be restructured, so that the proper spiritual activity of the monks could be cultivated by the removal of extraneous concerns, and so that the spiritual needs of the faithful under their care might be better addressed.

Subiaco was left the cathedral of S. Scolastica, the Abbazia di Santa Scolastica, the Sacro Speco, and all the Benedictine owned property on Monte Taleo and in "altura Collelungo." The parishes and their churches and chapels were divided among the dioceses of Palestrina, Anagni-Alatri, and Tivoli. Tivoli received the twenty-three parishes of: S. Andrea Apostolo in Subiaco, S. Andrea Apostolo (cura) in Subiaco", S. Maria Assunta della Valle in Subiaco", "S. Francesco d'Assisi in Subiaco, S. Chelidonia in Subiaco contrada Vignola, S. Giuseppe in Subiaco, the countryside called Livata-Campo dell'Osso, S. Felicita martire (with its archpriest) in the commune of Affile, S. Felicita martire (cura) in Affile, S. Maria di Sopra in Arcinazzo Romano, S. Maria di Sotto in Arcinazzo Romano, S. Andrea in Jenne, S. Maria in Gerano, S. Lorenzo in Gerano, S. Maria in Cerreto Laziale, S. Maria della Pace and S. Benedetto in Agosta, S. Maria Assunta in Agosta, S. Biagio in Marano Equo, S. Maria and S. Mauro in Canterano, S. Maria in Rocca Canterano, S. Maria in Rocca Canterano (Frazione di Rocca di Mezzo), S. Maria della Visitazione in Cervara di Roma, and S. Maria Assunta in Camerata Nuova.

The diocese of Tivoli gained more than 19,000 persons, and 49 priests.

== Bishops ==
=== to 1000 ===
- Paulus (366)
- Florentinus (c. 402–415)
- Candidus (c.465–504)
- Ignotus (c. 545)
- Anastasius (c. 595– c. 601?)
- Decoratus (649)
- Mauritius (678, 679)
- Anastasius (721)
- Joannes (743, 761)
- Theodosius (Theodericus) (769, 772)

...

- Sebastianus (826)
- Ursus (853)
- ? Calvus ?
- Leo (861)
- Petrus (877)

...

- Hucbertus (945)
- Joannes (c. 947–963)
- Benedict (964)
- Amizzo (971)
- Joannes (973)
- Amizzo (c. 982–after 991)
- Gualterus (993–1000),

=== 1000 to 1500 ===
- Bozo (c. 1014–after 1027))
- Benedictus (1029)
- Joannes (1030– after 1065)
- Adam (ca. 1061–1073)
- Maifred (attested 1117)
- Guido (1123–1154?);
- Otto (1155-1169)
- Milo(ne) (c. 1179–after 1185)

...

- Jacobus Antonius Colonna (c. 1209)
- Clarus (c. 1219)

...

- Theodinus (c. 1242–1252)
- Berardus (c. 1252-c. 1260)
- Gottifredus (1260-1265)
- Giacomo da Fossanova (5 Dec 1265-1280)
- Sabarizio (1282-1318)
- Jacobus, O.F.M. (1318-1320)
- Giovanni da Gabenna OP (1320-1337);
- [ Branca, OP (1337) ]
- Giovanni de Cors, OP (1337–1342)
- Nicolaus de Velletri (1342–1349)
- Daniel (1349–1367)
- Filippo Gezza de' Rufinis, OP (1367-1380)
- Pietro Cenci (1380–1384) Avignon Obedience
- Nicolaus de Talliacotio (1384– ? ) Avignon Obedience
- Petrus (Staglia) (1393–1398) Roman Obedience
- Domenico Valerini (1398–1418)
- Sante de Cavis (1419–1427)
- Nicolas Cesari (1427–1450)
- Fra Lorenzo, OMI (1450–1471), reformer of the clergy;
- Angelo Lupo Mancini de Cavis (1471–1485)
- Antonio de Grassis (1485–1491)
- Evangelista de Marisstella de Sutrio (1491–1499).
- Angelo Leonini (1499–3 1509)

=== 1500 to 1700 ===
- Camillo Leonini (1509–1513 Resigned)
- Francesco Soderini (1513–1516)
- Camillo Leonini (1518–1527)
- Marcantonio della Croce (1528–1554 Resigned)
- Giovanni Andrea della Croce (1554–1595)
- Domenico Toschi (1595–1606 Resigned)
- Giovanni Battista Toschi (1606–1621)
- Bartolomeo Cesi (Cesa) (1621)
- Marco Antonio Gozzadini (1621–1623)
- Mario Orsini (1624–1634)
- Giulio Roma (1634–1652)
- Marcello Santacroce (1652–1674)
- Federico Sforza (1675–1676)
- Mario Alberizzi (1676–1679 Resigned)
- Galeazzo Marescotti (1679–1684 Resigned)
- Antonio Fonseca (1690–1728)

=== 1700 to 1900 ===
- Francesco Antonio Finy (1728–1728 Resigned)
- Placido Pezzancheri, OCist (1728–1757 Died)
- Francesco Castellini (1758–1763 Appointed Bishop of Rimini)
- Tommaso Galli (1764–1765 Died)
- Giulio Matteo Natali (1765–1782 Died)
- Barnaba Chiaramonti (Gregorio Chiaramonti), OSB (1782–1785) (Appointed Bishop of Imola)
- Vincenzo Manni (1785–1815 Died)
- Giovanni Battista a Santa Margarita Pietro Alessandro Banfi, OCD (1816–1817 Died)
- Giuseppe Crispino Mazzotti (1818–1820) (Appointed Bishop of Cervia)
- Francesco Canali (1820–1827 Resigned)
- Francesco Pichi (1827–1840 Resigned)
- Carlo Gigli (1840–1880 Resigned)
- Placido Petacci (1880–1885 Resigned)
- Celestino del Frate (1885–1894) (Appointed Archbishop of Camerino)
- Gulielmus Maria d'Ambrogi, OESA (1895–1895 Resigned)
- Pietro Monti (1895–1902 Resigned)

=== since 1900 ===
- Prospero Scaccia (1903–1909) (Appointed Archbishop of Siena)
- Gabriele Vettori (1910–1915) (Appointed Bishop of Pistoia e Prato)
- Luigi Scarano (1917–1931 Died)
- Domenico Della Vedova (1933–1950 Retired)
- Luigi Faveri (1950–1967)

Sede Vacante (1967–1974), Guglielmo Giaquinta Apostolic Administrator

- Guglielmo Giaquinta (1974–1987 Resigned)
- Lino Esterino Garavaglia, OFMCap (1987–1991)
- Pietro Garlato (1991–2003 Retired)
- Giovanni Paolo Benotto (2003–2008)
- Mauro Parmeggiani (2008– )

== Bibliography ==
=== Sources for lists of bishops ===
- Gams, Pius Bonifatius (1873). Series episcoporum Ecclesiae catholicae: quotquot innotuerunt a beato Petro apostolo (in Latin). Ratisbon: Typis et Sumptibus Georgii Josephi Manz. p. 733.
- Eubel, Conradus, ed. (1913). Hierarchia catholica (in Latin). Vol. Tomus 1 (second ed.). Münster: Libreria Regensbergiana.
- Eubel, Conradus, ed. (1914). Hierarchia catholica (in Latin). Vol. Tomus 2 (second ed.). Münster: Libreria Regensbergiana.
- Eubel, Conradus; Gulik, Guilelmus, eds. (1923). Hierarchia catholica (in Latin). Vol. Tomus 3 (second ed.). Münster: Libreria Regensbergiana.
- Gauchat, Patritius (Patrice) (1935). Hierarchia catholica (in Latin). Vol. Tomus IV (1592-1667). Münster: Libraria Regensbergiana.
- Ritzler, Remigius; Sefrin, Pirminus (1952). Hierarchia catholica medii et recentis aevi V (1667-1730) (in Latin). Patavii: Messagero di S. Antonio.
- Ritzler, Remigius; Sefrin, Pirminus (1958). Hierarchia catholica medii et recentis aevi (in Latin). Vol. Tomus VI (1730-1799). Patavii: Messagero di S. Antonio.
- Ritzler, Remigius; Sefrin, Pirminus (1968). Hierarchia Catholica medii et recentioris aevi sive summorum pontificum, S. R. E. cardinalium, ecclesiarum antistitum series... A pontificatu Pii PP. VII (1800) usque ad pontificatum Gregorii PP. XVI (1846) (in Latin). Vol. VII. Monasterii: Libr. Regensburgiana.
- Remigius Ritzler; Pirminus Sefrin (1978). Hierarchia catholica Medii et recentioris aevi... A Pontificatu PII PP. IX (1846) usque ad Pontificatum Leonis PP. XIII (1903) (in Latin). Vol. VIII. Il Messaggero di S. Antonio.
- Pięta, Zenon (2002). Hierarchia catholica medii et recentioris aevi... A pontificatu Pii PP. X (1903) usque ad pontificatum Benedictii PP. XV (1922) (in Latin). Vol. IX. Padua: Messagero di San Antonio. ISBN 978-88-250-1000-8.

=== Studies ===
- Bruzza, Luigi (1880). Regesto della chiesa di Tivoli. (in Italian). [Studi e Documenti di Storia e Diritto]. Roma: 1880.
- Cappelletti, Giuseppe (1847). Le chiese d'Italia: dalla loro origine sino ai nostri giorni (in Italian). Vol. Tomo sesto (6). Venezia: G. Antonelli. pp. 641–716.
- Cascioli, Giuseppe (1921). "Nuova serie dei vescovi di Tivoli," (in Italian). In: Atti e memorie della Società Tiburtina di storia e d'arte Vol 1 (Tivoli: 1921), pp. 30-48.
- Kehr, Paul Fridolin (1907). Italia pontificia (in Latin). Vol. II: Lativm. Berlin: Weidmann. pp. 75–100. ISBN 978-5-88390-446-1.
- Lanzoni, Francesco (1927), Le diocesi d'Italia dalle origini al principio del secolo VII (an. 604). (in Italian). Faenza: F. Lega 1927. Pp. 134-138.
- Pacifici, Vincenzo (1919). "Tivoli e Corrado d'Antiochia", Archivio della Reale Società Romana di Storia Patria, vol. 42 (1919), pp. 269–288.
- Schwartz, Gerhard (1913), Die Besetzung der Bistümer Reichsitaliens unter den sächsischen und salischen Kaisern : mit den Listen der Bischöfe, 951-1122, Leipzig-Berlin 1913, p. 273-274. (in German)
- Ughelli, Ferdinando; Coleti, Niccolò (1717). Italia sacra sive De Episcopis Italiae, et insularum adjacentium (in Latin). Vol. Tomus primus (1) (editio secunda, aucta et emendata ed.). Venice: apud Sebastianum Coleti. pp. 1301–1315.
- Viola, Sante (1819). Storia di Tivoli dalla sua origine fino al secolo 17 (in Italian). Vol. Tomo terzo (3). Roma: Francesco Bourlie.
