= Pietro Menzi =

Most Reverend Pietro Menzi
- Bishop of Cesena
- Church: Catholic Church
- Diocese: Diocese of Cesena
- In office: 1487–1504
- Predecessor: Antonio Malatesta
- Successor: Fazio Giovanni Santori

Pietro Menzi (died 1504) was a Roman Catholic prelate who served as Bishop of Cesena (1487–1504).

== Biography ==
On 11 May 1487, Pietro Menzi was appointed Bishop of Cesena by Pope Innocent VIII.

He served as Bishop of Cesena until his death in 1504.

Catholic Church titles
Preceded by Antonio Malatesta	Bishop of Cesena; 1487–1504	Succeeded by Fazio Giovanni Santori
