= Diocese of Cesena-Sarsina =

Roman Catholic diocese in Italy

Diocese of Cesena-Sarsina Dioecesis Caesenatensis-Sarsinatensis

Catholic
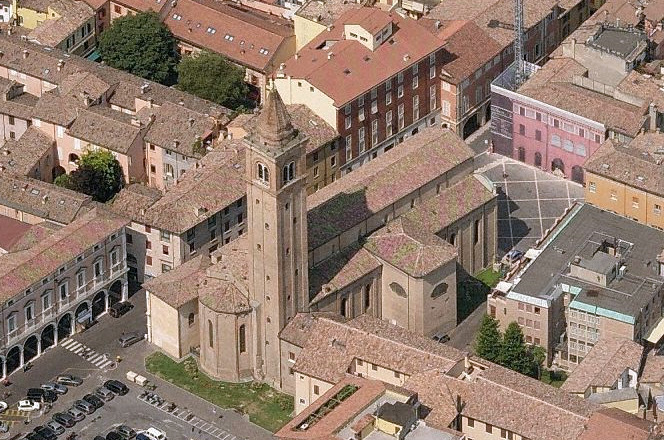
- Cesena Cathedral

Location
- Country: Italy
- Ecclesiastical province: Ravenna-Cervia

Statistics
- Area: 1,185 km^{2} (458 sq mi)
- Population: Total; Catholics: (as of 2023); 173,215 ▲; 162,985 (est.) ▼ (94.1%)
- Parishes: 87 ▼

Information
- Rite: Latin Rite
- Established: 1st century
- Cathedral: Basilica Cattedrale di S. Giovanni Battista (Cesena)
- Co-cathedral: Concattedrale di SS. Annuniziata, S. Vicinio (Sarsina)
- Secular priests: 77 (diocesan) ▼52 (Religious Orders) ▲47 Permanent Deacons ▲

Current leadership
- Pope: Leo XIV
- Bishop: Antonio Giuseppe Caiazzo
- Bishops emeritus: Douglas Regattieri

Website
- diocesicesenasarsina.it

The Diocese of Cesena-Sarsina (Latin: Dioecesis Caesenatensis-Sarsinatensis) is a Latin diocese of the Catholic Church in Emilia-Romagna was created on September 30, 1986, after the Diocese of Sarsina was united with the historic Diocese of Cesena as a suffragan of the Archdiocese of Ravenna-Cervia.

The current bishop of Cesena-Sarsina is Archbishop Antonio Giuseppe Caiazzo, who was formerly the archbishop of Matera-Irsina and retained the personal title of archbishop upon being transferred to this see. He was appointed January 7, 2025, after Bishop Douglas Regattieri, who is now bishop emeritus.

== History ==
Cesena was the ancient Cæsena.

The very first catalog of the bishops of Cesena was drawn up by Antonio Casari of Cesena in the middle of the 16th century. The work is lost, but its contents, and a good deal more, were published by Fra Bernardino Manzoni, O.Min., of Cesena, the Inquisitor of Pisa, in his Caesenae chronologia (1643). The claim used to be made that the founder of Christianity in Cesena, and its first bishop, was Philemon, to whom Paul of Tarsus addressed an epistle. Another 1st century bishop, Isidorus, is said to have lived in the time of Pope Anacletus (c.79–c.91) and to have been a martyr; his existence depends on a single document, which no one has seen, and Isidore is therefore generally rejected. A bishop is posited in the second half of the 2nd century, since Pope Eleutherius (c. 174–189) consecrated his cathedral; but until the Edict of Milan, Christianity was an illegal assembly, and was not allowed to own property or build churches; the story is rightly rejected as an "impudent forgery".

After the overthrow of the Ostrogoths it became a part of the Exarchate of Ravenna. By the Donation of Pepin (752), it became a fief of the Holy See, which was confirmed in its possession by King Rudolph I of Germany (1275, 1278).

In medieval times Cesena was governed by various families, among them the Ordelaffi di Forli and the Malatesta, the latter being remembered for their justice and good government.

On 27 May 1357, a major fire destroyed many of the buildings in the episcopal compound.

On 1 February 1377, Cesena was the witness to, and the victim of, an assault by Breton mercenary troops in the service of Pope Gregory XI and the Papacy. The massacre was ordered by Cardinal Robert of Geneva, the papal legate in northern Italy.

In 1500, Cesare Borgia, having resigned the cardinalate and been given the title of "Gonfaloniere of the Holy Roman Church" and Captain General of the papal armies, began the conquest of the Romagna. In late 1500 he seized Pesaro and Rimini, and, on 25 April 1501, Faenza as well. His father Pope Alexander VI awarded him the title of Duke of Romagna, and Cesena became his capital. The Borgia pope, however, died on 18 August 1503, and the new pope, Julius II (della Rovere) was not interested in maintaining a semi-independent duchy in the Romagna. After the surrender of his castles to Pope Julius II, Cesare Borgia, no longer Duke of Romagna, fled Rome, seeking refuge in Naples. Cesena, though loyal to Duke Cesare, with the rest of Romagna again acknowledged the immediate authority of the Holy See (1504).

=== Chapter and cathedral ===
A new cathedral was built upon the petition of the Provost and Chapter and the citizens of Cesena, with the permission of Pope Urban VI, and named in honor of S. Giovanni Battista. Construction began in 1408. The cathedral was staffed and administered by a corporation called the Chapter, which consisted of two dignities (not dignitaries), the Provost and the Archdeacon, and fifteen Canons. In addition there was a Theological Prebend and a Penitential Prebend. In the mid-19th century, the Chapter was composed of three dignities (Provost, Archdeacon, Archpriest) and ten Canons.

=== Synods ===
A diocesan synod was an irregularly held, but important, meeting of the bishop of a diocese and his clergy. Its purpose was (1) to proclaim generally the various decrees already issued by the bishop; (2) to discuss and ratify measures on which the bishop chose to consult with his clergy; (3) to publish statutes and decrees of the diocesan synod, of the provincial synod, and of the Holy See.

Bishop Odoardo Gualandi (1557–1588) presided over two diocesan synods, in 1565 and 1566. His nephew, Bishop Camillo Gualandi (1588 – 11 Feb 1609) held a diocesan synod on 15 October 1590.

Cardinal Jan Kazimierz Denhoff (1687–1697) held a diocesan synod in the cathedral of Cesena from 30 June to 2 July 1693.

On 16–18 June 1777, Bishop Francesco Agoselli (1763–1791) presided at a diocesan synod.

=== Consolidation of dioceses ===
The Second Vatican Council (1962–1965), in order to ensure that all Catholics received proper spiritual attention, decreed the reorganization of the diocesan structure of Italy and the consolidation of small and struggling dioceses. These considerations applied to Cesena and Sarsina. In 1980, Cesena claimed an estimated Catholic population of 152,000, with 201 priests. Sarsina, in 1980 had only 13,200 Catholics, and 34 priests.

On 18 February 1984, the Vatican and the Italian State signed a new and revised concordat. Based on the revisions, a set of Normae was issued on 15 November 1984, which was accompanied in the next year, on 3 June 1985, by enabling legislation. According to the agreement, the practice of having one bishop govern two separate dioceses at the same time, aeque personaliter, was abolished. Bishop Luigi Amaducci had governed both Cesena and Sarsina since 1977.

Instead, the Vatican continued consultations which had begun under Pope John XXIII for the merging of small dioceses, especially those with personnel and financial problems, into one combined diocese. On 30 September 1986, Pope John Paul II ordered that the dioceses of Cesena and Sarsina be merged into one diocese with one bishop, with the Latin title Dioecesis Caesenatensis-Sarsinatensis . The seat of the diocese was to be in Cesena, and the cathedral of Cesena was to serve as the cathedral of the merged dioceses. The cathedral in Sarsina was to become a co-cathedral, and the cathedral Chapter was to be a Capitulum Concathedralis. There was to be only one diocesan Tribunal, in Cesena, and likewise one seminary, one College of Consultors, and one Priests' Council. The territory of the new diocese was to include the territory of the former diocese of Sarsina.

== Bishops ==
=== Diocese of Cesena ===
Metropolitan: Archdiocese of Ravenna

==== to 1200 ====
...

- Natalis (before 603)
- Concordius (attested 603)

...

- Maurus (attested 649)

...

- Florus (attested 679)

...

- Romanus (attested 826)

...

- Florus (attested 858–861)
- Petrus (attested 877)

...

- Maurus (934–946)
- Constantius (attested 946)
- Gonfredus (attested 955)

...

- Duodo (Dodo) (attested 967–973)

...

- Sergius (attested 998–1001)

...

- Mannatius (Maricianus) (attested 1016–1027)

...

- Joannes (attested 1031–1053)
- Desiderius (attested 1057)

[Hildebrandus (c. 1065)]
...

- Gebizo (attested 1083–1097)

...

- Ugo (attested 1106)

...

- Benno (attested 1123–1141)
- Odone Fattiboni (attested 1155–1159)

...

- Leonardus, O.Cist. (attested 1175, 1179)
- Leto (attested 1186)

==== 1200 to 1500 ====
...

- Oddo (attested 1207–1223)
- Manzinus (attested 1232–1250)
- Michael, O.Min.
- Franciscus O.P. (attested 1263)
- Eberhard of Saxony, O.P (1266–1274)
- Aimericus (1274–1290)
- Leonardus (1291–1312)
- Joannes Caminata (1313–1322)
- Gerardus d'Anglars (1323–1324)
- Thomas de Muro (1324–1326)
- Ambrosius, O.E.S.A. (1326–1332)
- Gian Battista Acciaioli (1332–1342)
- Bernardus Martellini, O.E.S.A. (1342–1348)
- Guilelmus de Mirolis, O.Min. (1348–1358)
- Vitalis da Cesena, O.Min. (1358–1362)
- Bencevenus (1362–1364)
- Lucius de Cagli (1364–1374)
- Joannes Bertetus, O.P. (1374–1376)
- Ludovicus degli Aloisi (1376–1378?)
- Jacobus (attested 1379) (Roman Obedience)
- Averardus (attested 1383) (Avignon Obedience?)
- Jacobus, O.Carm.
- Joannes (attested 1394)
- Jacobus (attested 1398)
- Gregorio Malesardi (1405–1419)
- Victor da Rimini, O.E.S.A. (1419–1425)
- Paulus Ferrante (1425–1431)
- Augustinus Favorini, O.E.S.A. (1431–1435) Administrator
- Antonio Malatesta (1435–1475)
- Joannes Venturelli (1475–1486)
- Pietro Menzi de Vincentia (11 May 1487 – 1504)

==== 1500 to 1800 ====
- Cardinal Fazio Giovanni Santori (1504–1510)
- Cristoforo Spiriti (1510 – 5 Nov 1556)

Giovanni Battista Spiriti, Coadjutor

- Odoardo Gualandi (Galanti) (7 Dec 1557 – 1588 Resigned)
- Camillo Gualandi (30 Mar 1588 – 11 Feb 1609)
- Cardinal Michelangelo Tonti (11 Mar 1609 – 21 Apr 1622)
- Cardinal Francesco Sacrati (23 May 1622 – 6 Sep 1623)
- Lorenzo Campeggi (8 Dec 1623 – 1628)
- Pietro Bonaventura (14 Mar 1629 – 23 Jul 1653)
- Flaminio Marcellino (21 Apr 1655 – 14 Mar 1677)
- Giacomo Fantuzzi (Elefantucci) (30 Aug 1677 – 29 Nov 1679)
- Pietro Francesco Orsini de Gravina, O.P. (22 Jan 1680 –1686)
- Jan Kazimierz Denhoff (1687–1697 Resigned)
- Giovanni Fontana (3 Jun 1697 – 2 Mar 1716)
- Marco Battista Battaglini (8 Jun 1716 – 19 Sep 1717)
- Francesco Saverio Guicciardi (24 Jan 1718 – 18 Jan 1725)
- Giovanni Battista Orsi, C.O. (21 Mar 1725 – 15 Nov 1734 Resigned)
- Guido Orselli (17 Nov 1734 – 18 Mar 1763)
- Francesco Agoselli (18 Jul 1763 – 8 Jan 1791)
- Carlo Bellisomi (22 Sep 1795 –1808)

==== Since 1800 ====
- Francesco Saverio Castiglioni (1816–1821)
- Antonio Maria Cadolini, B. (1822–1838)
- Innocenzo Castracane degli Antelminelli (1838–1848)
- Enrico Orfei (11 Sep 1848 – 23 Mar 1860 Appointed, Archbishop of Ravenna)
- Vincenzo Moretti (23 Mar 1860 – 27 Mar 1867 Appointed, Bishop of Imola)
- Paolo Bentini (27 Oct 1871 – 30 Nov 1881)
- Giovanni Maria Strocchi (27 Mar 1882 – 1887)
- Alfonso Maria Vespignani (1 Jun 1888 – 11 Feb 1904)
- Giovanni Cazzani (5 Aug 1904 – 19 Dec 1914 Appointed, Bishop of Cremona)
- Fabio Berdini (4 Jun 1915 – 24 Jun 1926 Resigned)
- Alfonso Archi (4 Mar 1927 – 4 Dec 1938 Died)
- Beniamino Socche (4 Feb 1939 – 13 Feb 1946 Appointed, Bishop of Reggio Emilia)
- Vincenzo Gili (22 Mar 1946 – 30 Nov 1954)
- Giuseppe Amici (1 Feb 1955 – 23 Dec 1956 Appointed, Archbishop of Modena e Nonantola)
- Augusto Gianfranceschi (3 Feb 1957 – 28 May 1977 Retired)
- Luigi Amaducci (28 May 1977 – 27 Oct 1990 Appointed, Archbishop of Ravenna-Cervia)

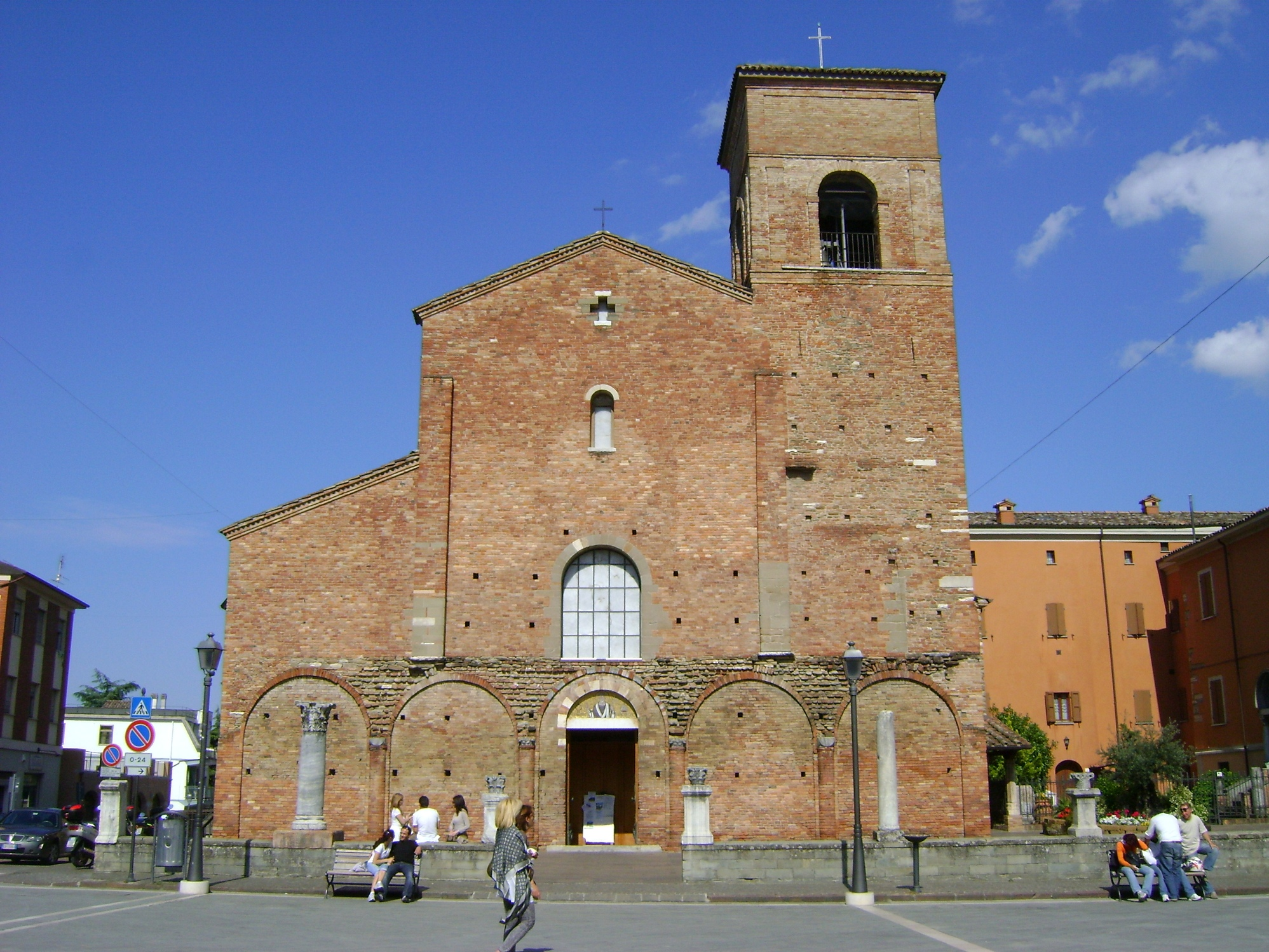
Co-Cathedral in Sarsina

=== Diocese of Cesena-Sarsina ===
30 September 1986: United with the Diocese of Sarsina to form the Diocese of Cesena-Sarsina

- Lino Esterino Garavaglia, O.F.M. Cap. (25 Mar 1991 – 3 Dec 2003 Retired)
- Antonio Lanfranchi (3 Dec 2003 – 27 Jan 2010 Appointed, Archbishop of Modena-Nonantola)
- Douglas Regattieri (8 Oct 2010 – 7 Jan 2025 Retired)
- Antonio Giuseppe Caiazzo (Appointed, personal title of Archbishop)

== Books ==
=== Reference works ===
- Gams, Pius Bonifatius (1873). Series episcoporum Ecclesiae catholicae: quotquot innotuerunt a beato Petro apostolo. Ratisbon: Typis et Sumptibus Georgii Josephi Manz. pp. 681–683. (in Latin)
- Eubel, Conradus, ed. (1913). Hierarchia catholica. Vol. Tomus 1 (second ed.). Münster: Libreria Regensbergiana. (in Latin)
- Eubel, Conradus, ed. (1914). Hierarchia catholica. Vol. Tomus 2 (second ed.). Münster: Libreria Regensbergiana. (in Latin)
- Gulik, Guilelmus (1923). Eubel, Conradus (ed.). Hierarchia catholica. Vol. Tomus 3 (second ed.). Münster: Libreria Regensbergiana. (in Latin)
- Gauchat, Patritius (Patrice) (1935). Hierarchia catholica. Vol. Tomus IV (1592-1667). Münster: Libraria Regensbergiana. (in Latin)
- Ritzler, Remigius; Sefrin, Pirminus (1952). Hierarchia catholica medii et recentis aevi V (1667-1730). Patavii: Messagero di S. Antonio.
- Ritzler, Remigius; Sefrin, Pirminus (1958). Hierarchia catholica medii et recentis aevi. Vol. Tomus VI (1730-1799). Patavii: Messagero di S. Antonio. (in Latin)
- Ritzler, Remigius; Sefrin, Pirminus (1968). Hierarchia Catholica medii et recentioris aevi sive summorum pontificum, S. R. E. cardinalium, ecclesiarum antistitum series... A pontificatu Pii PP. VII (1800) usque ad pontificatum Gregorii PP. XVI (1846) (in Latin). Vol. VII. Monasterii: Libr. Regensburgiana.
- Remigius Ritzler; Pirminus Sefrin (1978). Hierarchia catholica Medii et recentioris aevi... A Pontificatu PII PP. IX (1846) usque ad Pontificatum Leonis PP. XIII (1903) (in Latin). Vol. VIII. Il Messaggero di S. Antonio.
- Pięta, Zenon (2002). Hierarchia catholica medii et recentioris aevi... A pontificatu Pii PP. X (1903) usque ad pontificatum Benedictii PP. XV (1922) (in Latin). Vol. IX. Padua: Messagero di San Antonio. ISBN 978-88-250-1000-8.

=== Studies ===
- Cappelletti, Giuseppei (1844). Le chiese d'Italia (in Italian). Vol. secondo. Venezia: Antonelli. pp. 525–556.
- Coleti, Nicolaus (Niccolò) (1779). Series episcoporum Caesenatium a Ferdinando Ughellio contexta a Nicolao Coleto aliquantulum aucta, et emendata. Nunc a Francisco Antonio Zaccaria ut fieri potuit, restituta, atque ad nostrum tempus perducta. Caesenae: apug Gregorium Blasinium 1779. (in Latin)
- Lanzoni, Francesco (1927). Le diocesi d'Italia dalle origini al principio del secolo VII (an. 604). Faenza: F. Lega, pp. 714–721. (in Italian)
- Manzoni, Bernardino (1643), Caesenae chronologia in duas partes divisa : in quarum prima ecclesiae antistites, secunda civitatis domini Pisis [Pisa]: Typis Amatoris Massae & Laurentij de Landis. (in Latin)
- Schwartz, Gerhard (1907). Die Besetzung der Bistümer Reichsitaliens unter den sächsischen und salischen Kaisern: mit den Listen der Bischöfe, 951-1122. Leipzig: B.G. Teubner. pp. 175–176. (in German)
- Ughelli, Ferdinando; Coleti, Niccolò (1717). Italia sacra sive De Episcopis Italiae, et insularum adjacentium (in Italian). Vol. Tomus secundus (2). Venice: apud Sebastianum Coleti. pp. 441–467.
- Zaccaria, Francesco Antonio (1779). Series episcoporum Cæsenatium a Ferdinando Ughellio contexta a Nicolao Coleto aliquantulum aucta, et emendata. Nunc a Francisco Antonio Zaccaria ut fieri potuit, restituta, atque ad nostrum tempus perducta (in Latin). Cesena: apud Gregorium Blasinium.
