= Menzie =

Menzie is a given name and a surname. Notable persons with the name include:

- DeQuan Menzie (born 1990), American football player
- Dylan Menzie, Canadian singer-songwriter
- Jye Menzie (born 2002), Australian rules footballer
- Menzie Chinn (born 1961), American academic
- Menzie Yere (born 1983), Papua New Guinean rugby league player

== See also ==
- Mario Acevedo (born 1969), Guatemalan football player
