= Gualandi =

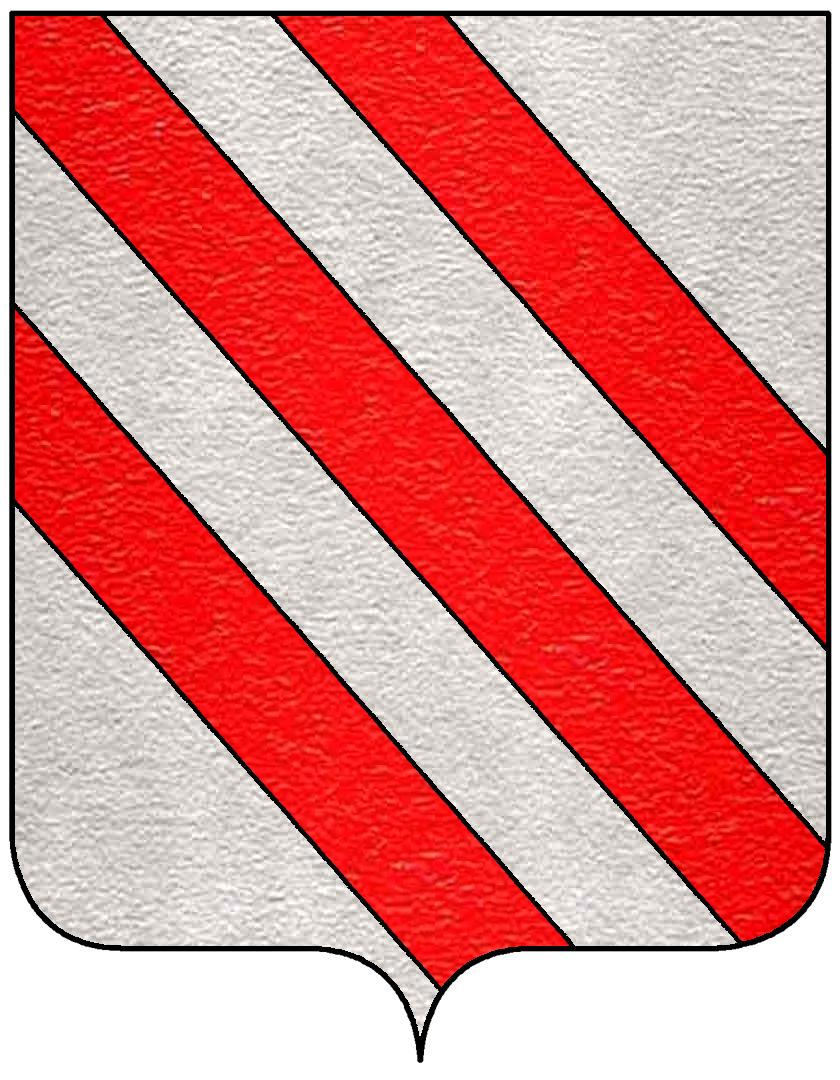
Coat of arms of Gualandi family

The Gualandi family is an old Italian noble family, originally from Pisa.

== History ==
In the Middle Ages this family supported the Ghibellines and it was one of the family that the archbishop Ruggieri degli Ubaldini incited against Ugolino della Gherardesca. The Gualandi family is cited by Dante Alighieri in the Inferno (XXXIII, 32).
