= Menzi (food) =

Snack from China

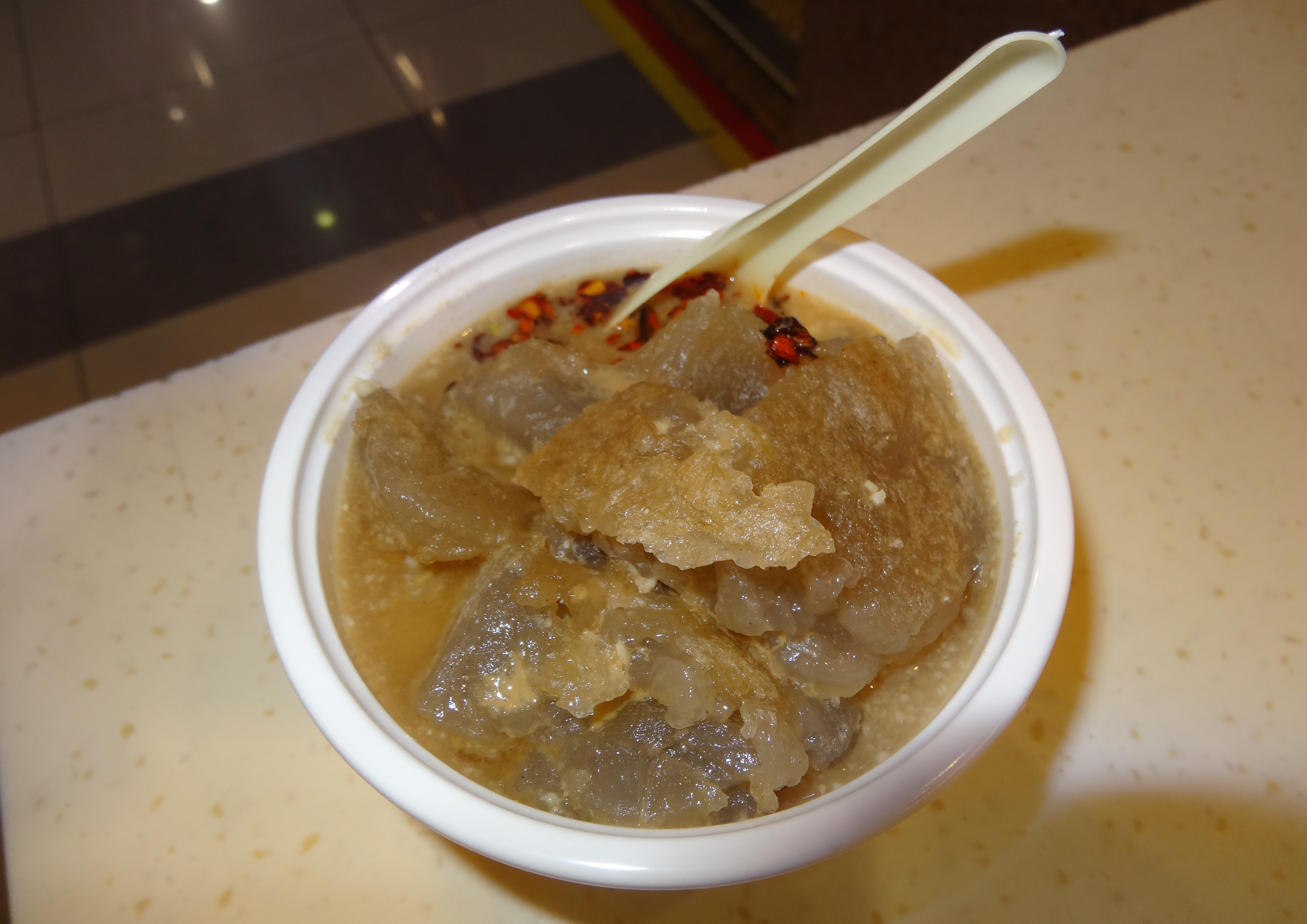
- A small serving of Menzi in Dalian
- Type: Street Food
- Place of origin: China
- Region or state: Dalian, Yantai, Dingzhou, Yuzhou
- Main ingredients: Tapioca starch, sesame paste, garlic, cilantro

Menzi (Chinese: 焖子; pinyin: mèn zi) is a special snack popular in the regions of Jiaodong Peninsula, Liaodong Peninsula, Hebei, Henan and Tianjin in China. It is mainly distributed in the cities of Dalian, Yantai, Dandong, Tangshan, Dingzhou, Tianjin, and Qinhuangdao, among other places. The main ingredient is cold noodle made of tapioca starch, accompanied by sesame sauce.

== Origins ==
There are various sayings about the origin of Menzi; the following is one of them.

More than a hundred years ago, two brothers of the Men's family went to Yantai to dry vermicelli. Once they had just finished making the vermicelli, when there was a cloudy day, it could not be dried and was going to be sour. In an emergency, the brothers invited the villagers to fry the vermicelli in oil and eat it with garlic. After eating, the people said in unison that it was delicious and flavorful. So they helped the Men brothers to set up a pot and stove to fry the vermicelli for sale. Although people said it was delicious, no one could tell them the name of the food when asked. One of them thought that it was created by the Men brothers, and fried in oil, so they came out with the name 'Menzi'.

== Varieties ==
=== Dalian Menzi ===
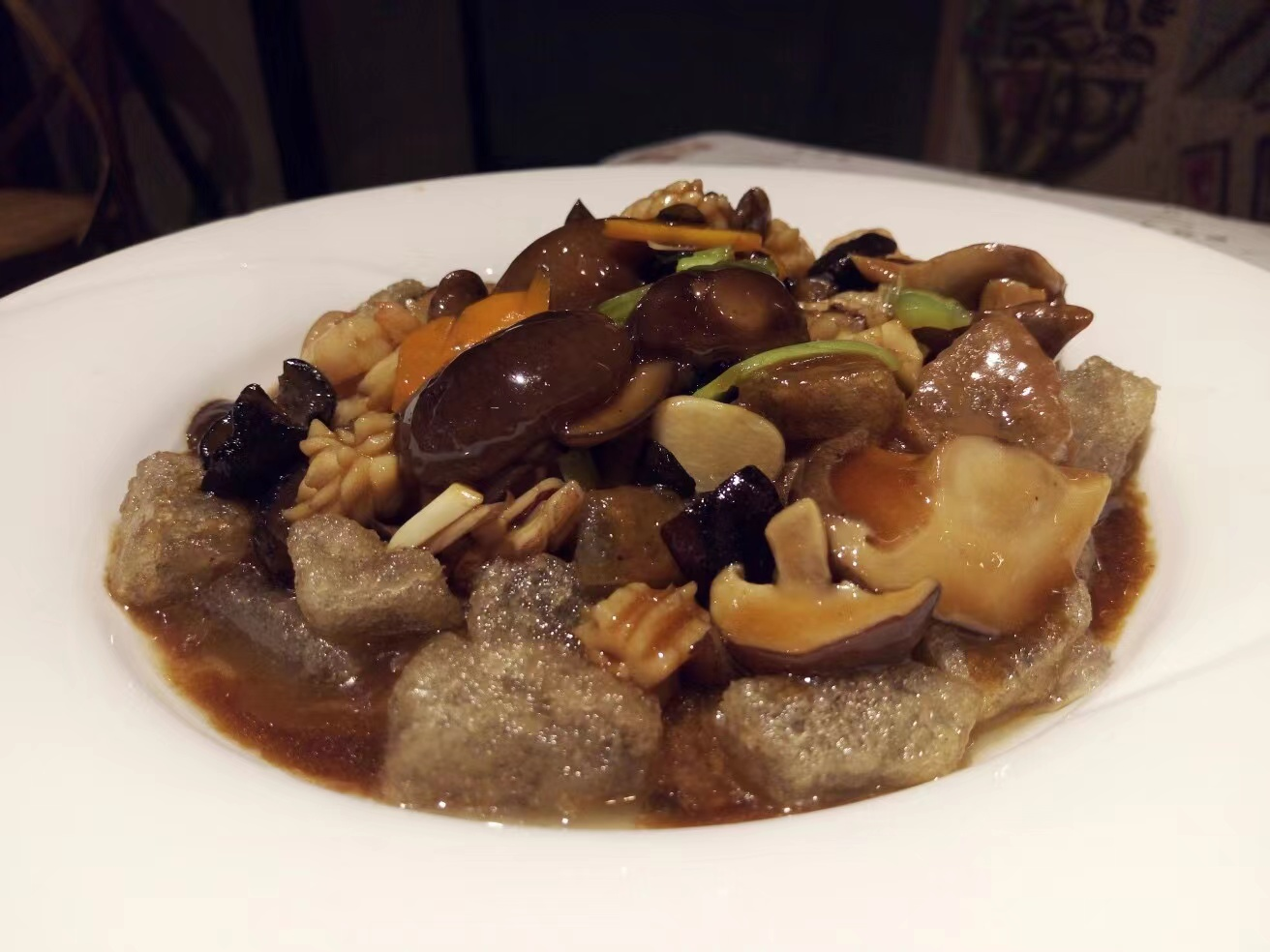
Dalian Menzi with Seafood

Dalian Menzi is a famous local snack. It is golden and oily, spicy and lasting aftertaste. Cut the Menzi into several three to four centimeter-long pieces and fry them in a pan of hot oil until golden brown and fragrant on both sides. Spoon them out with a spatula and divide them into several small plates. Then put the garlic paste, sesame sauce, soy sauce and make a sauce. Pour the sauce over the Menzi and eat it with a small fork while it is still hot.

=== Yantai Menzi ===
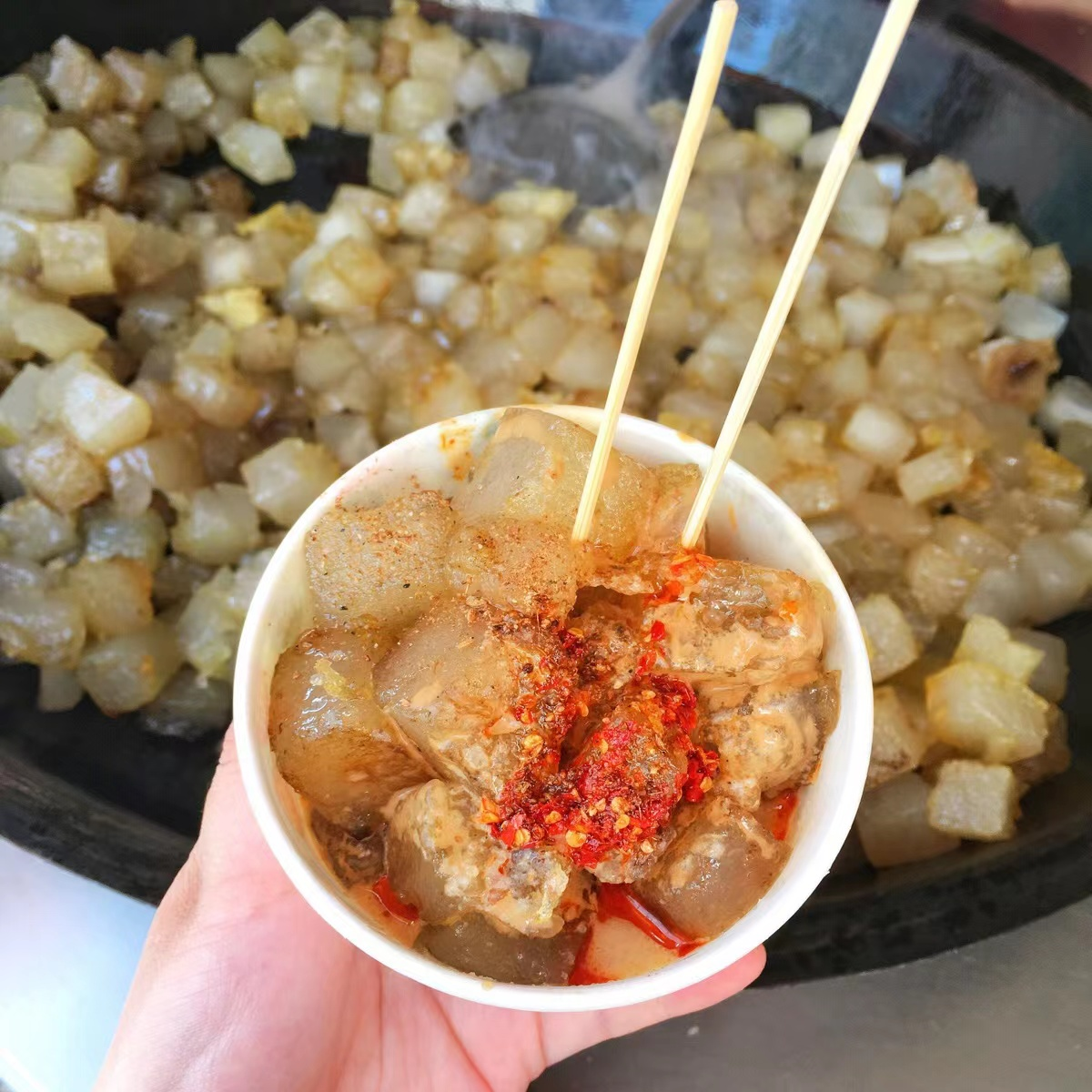
Yantai Menzi

Yantai Menzi uses Yantai cold noodles as the main ingredient. The cold noodles are cut into small pieces and fried in a pan until the outside of the noodles become charred. Then served with seasonings such as shrimp oil, soy sauce, sesame sauce and garlic sauce. The taste is similar to Beijing's fried sausage.

=== Yuzhou Menzi ===
Another name for Yuzhou Menzi is Xuchang Menzi. Yuzhou Menzi comes from the rural areas of Xuchang. It is made by mixing tapioca starch and sweet potato vermicelli, which is usually used for stir-frying and dipping in garlic sauce.

=== Dingzhou Menzi ===
Dingzhou Menzi is made of lean pork and Dingzhou's special yam flour noodles. Dingzhou's Menzi is passed down through the style of each family, each with its own characteristics.
