= Jan Kazimierz Denhoff =

Polish cardinal and theologian (1649–1697)

His Eminence Jan Kazimierz Denhoff
- Cardinal, Bishop of Cesena
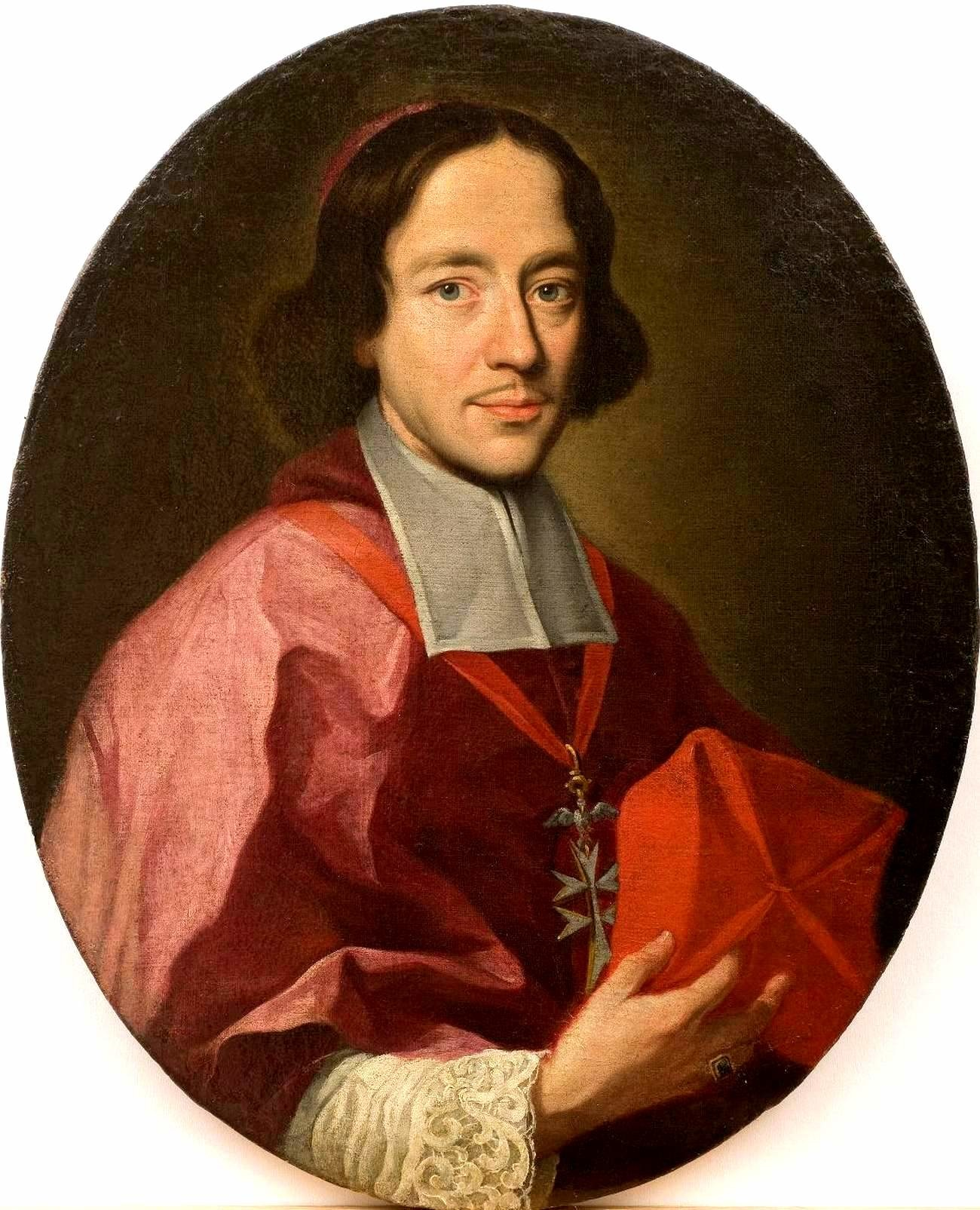
- Portrait of cardinal Jan Kazimierz Denhoff by workshop of Giovanni Maria Morandi, after 1687, Museum of King John III's Palace at Wilanów
- Appointed: 2 September 1686
- Predecessor: Vincenzo Maria Orsini
- Successor: Giovanni Fontana

Orders
- Consecration: 14 December 1687

Personal details
- Born: 6 July 1649 Warsaw, Polish–Lithuanian Commonwealth
- Died: 20 July 1697 (aged 48) Rome, Papal States
- Denomination: Roman Catholic

Jan Kazimierz Denhoff (1649–1697) was a Polish cardinal from 1686, Abbot of the Mogiła Abbey in 1666, canon of Warsaw, Dean of Płock, a canon of Kraków in 1681 and Bishop of Cesena in 1688. He is the author of several theological works.

== Early life ==
Denhoff was born in Warsaw as the son of the then royal courtier Teodor Denhoff and Katarzyna Franciszka von Bessen, mistress of king John II Casimir Vasa. His sister, Elżbieta Denhoff, married Prince Stanisław Herakliusz Lubomirski, and was the mother of Prince Teodor Lubomirski. Denhoff was educated at the Jesuit College at Pułtusk.

== Career ==
In the days of John III Sobieski, Denhoff represented Polish interests in the Holy See in the Vatican. Denhoff held various positions in the Roman Curia, including the Supreme Court of the Apostolic Signatura. Pope Innocent XI created him Cardinal at the Consistory of 2 September 1686 and was appointed bishop of Cesena in 1687.

Cardinal Denhoff was camerling of the Sacred College in 1695 and 1696. He participated in the conclave of 1689, in which Alexander VIII was elected pope, and in that of 1691 (election of Innocent XII). Shortly before his death in 1697 he resigned from the Diocese of Cesena and died in Rome.

=== Gallery ===
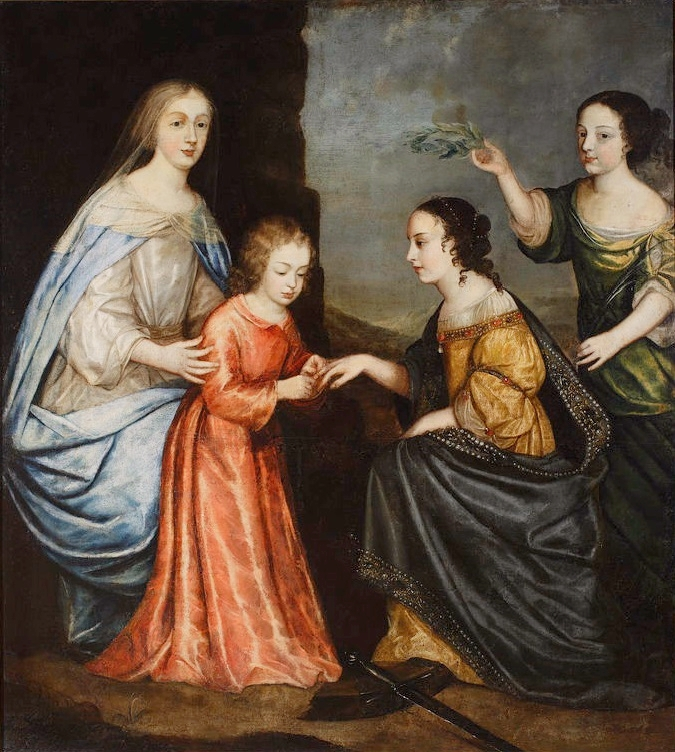
Mystical marriage of Saint Catherine by circle of Peter Danckerts de Rij, ca. 1659

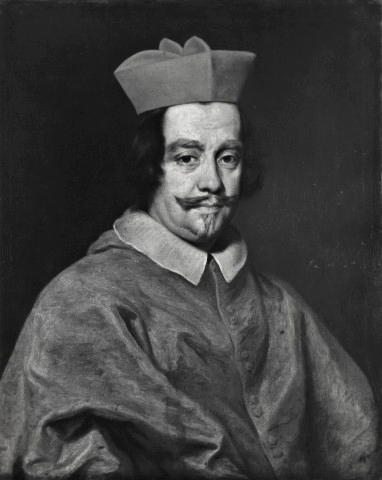
Portrait of a cardinal (most probably Jan Kazimierz Denhoff) by Giovanni Battista Gaulli, 1690s

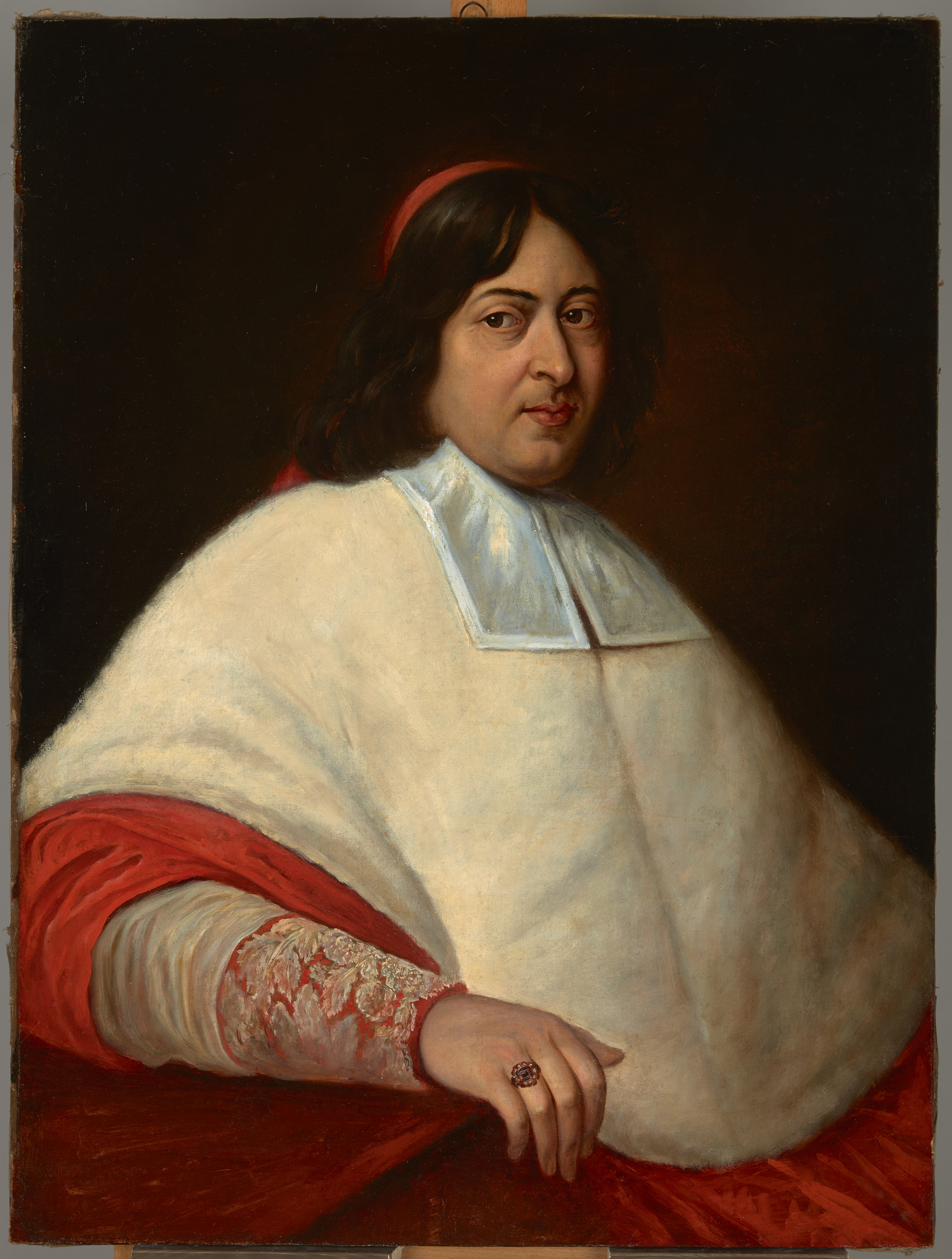
Portrait of Cardinal Jan Kazimierz Denhoff, ca. 1694, National Museum in Kraków

Catholic Church titles
Preceded by Vincenzo Maria Orsini	Bishop of Cesena; 1687–1697	Succeeded by Giovanni Fontana
