= Enzio von Pfeil =

German economist

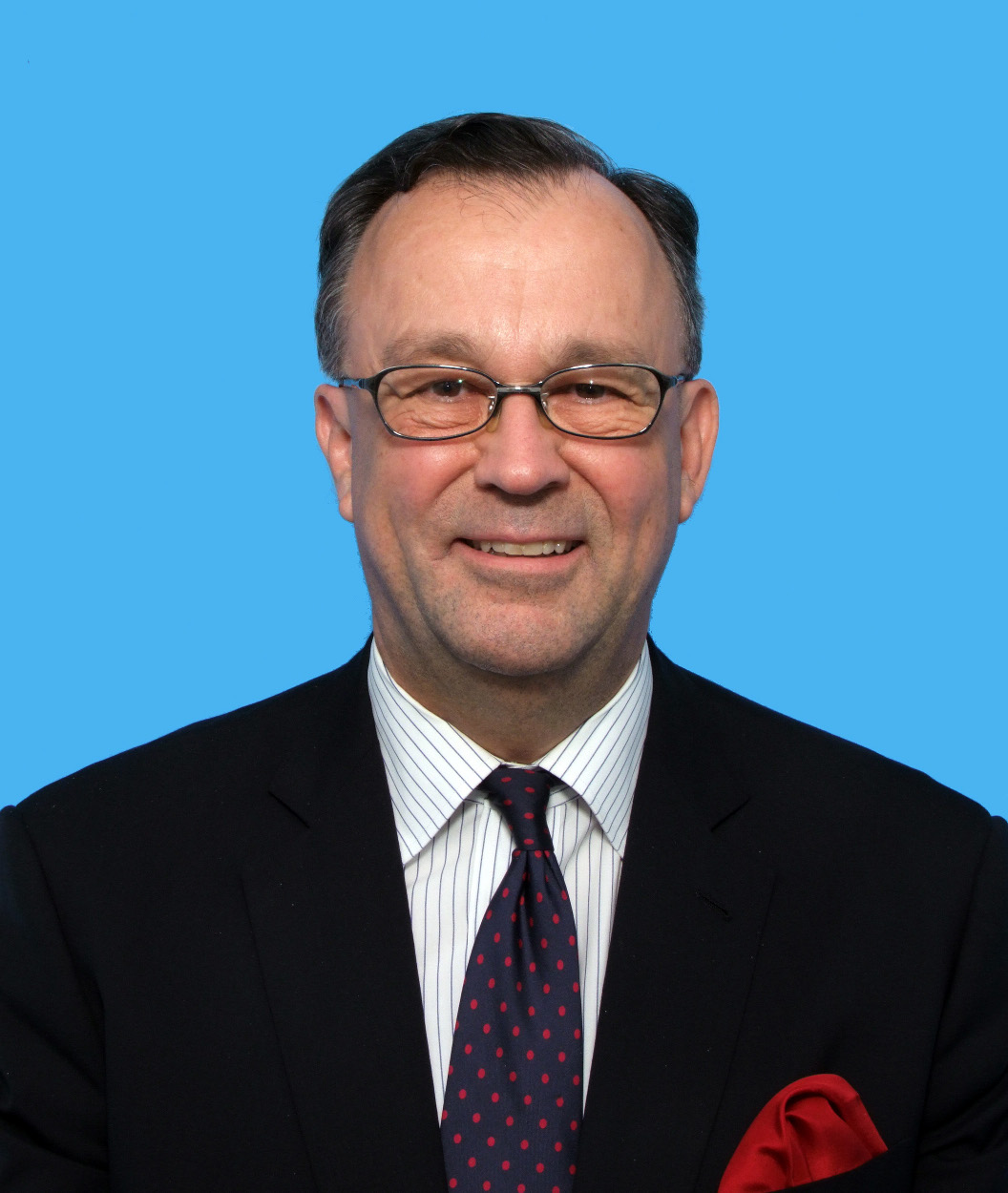
- Born: 7 September 1952 (age 73); Windhoek
- Occupations: Consultant, commission-free, financial planning

Enzio, count von Pfeil (Windhoek, South-West Africa, 7 September 1953) is a German economist.

== Early life ==
Enzio von Pfeil has been a commercial economist throughout his working life. Enzio studied inter alia under Friedrich von Hayek at the University of Freiburg, in West Germany. He graduated at the top of his class and received two scholarships. One from the "Studienstiftung des deutschen Volkes", which is reserved for the top one per cent of all German students, and the other from the Free Democratic Party's (FDP) exclusive Friedrich-Naumann Stiftung. His PhD thesis examined the macro economic impact of direct investment flows. At the University, he was appointed as an Assistant Professor specializing in international economics.

== Career ==
Enzio von Pfeil spent many years as a treasury economist for JP Morgan and Schroders in New York and London, and as a banker specializing in macro investment planning on behalf of large industrial families in the region while stationed in Istanbul. In 1986, von Pfeil became Chief Regional Economist at Smith New Court Far East Ltd, London which merged with Merrill Lynch. Enzio von Pfeil moved to Hong Kong in 1989 and by 2000 he had helped, as Chief Regional Economist, S.G. Warburg Securities Far East (which subsequently was bought by UBS), Clarion Capital and ABN-AMRO establish Asian specialist regional economic research teams.

For some years, Enzio von Pfeil ran his own macro advisory firm, Commercial Economics Asia Limited. He advises institutional as well as private investors.

In 2015 Enzio von Pfeil joined Private Capital Limited.

== Works ==
Enzio von Pfeil has written the following books:

- Deutsche Direktinvestitionen in den USA (in German). Frankfurt: Knapp. 1979.
- German Direct Investments in the United States, Greenwich, Connecticut: JAI Press. 1985.
- Effective Control of Currency Risks : A Practical, Comprehensive Guide, London: Macmillan and New York: St. Martin's Press. 1988.
- Trade Myths: Globalization and the Trade Balance Fallacy. 2008.

Enzio von Pfeil contributes regularly to Reuters as well as Bloomberg TV, Channel News Asia and to CNBC as well as NDTV (India) and Z TV (India). He has appeared inter alia in the Asian Wall Street Journal, The Economist, Forbes, the New York Times, and the South China Morning Post.
