= Annibale Angelini =

Italian painter and scenographer

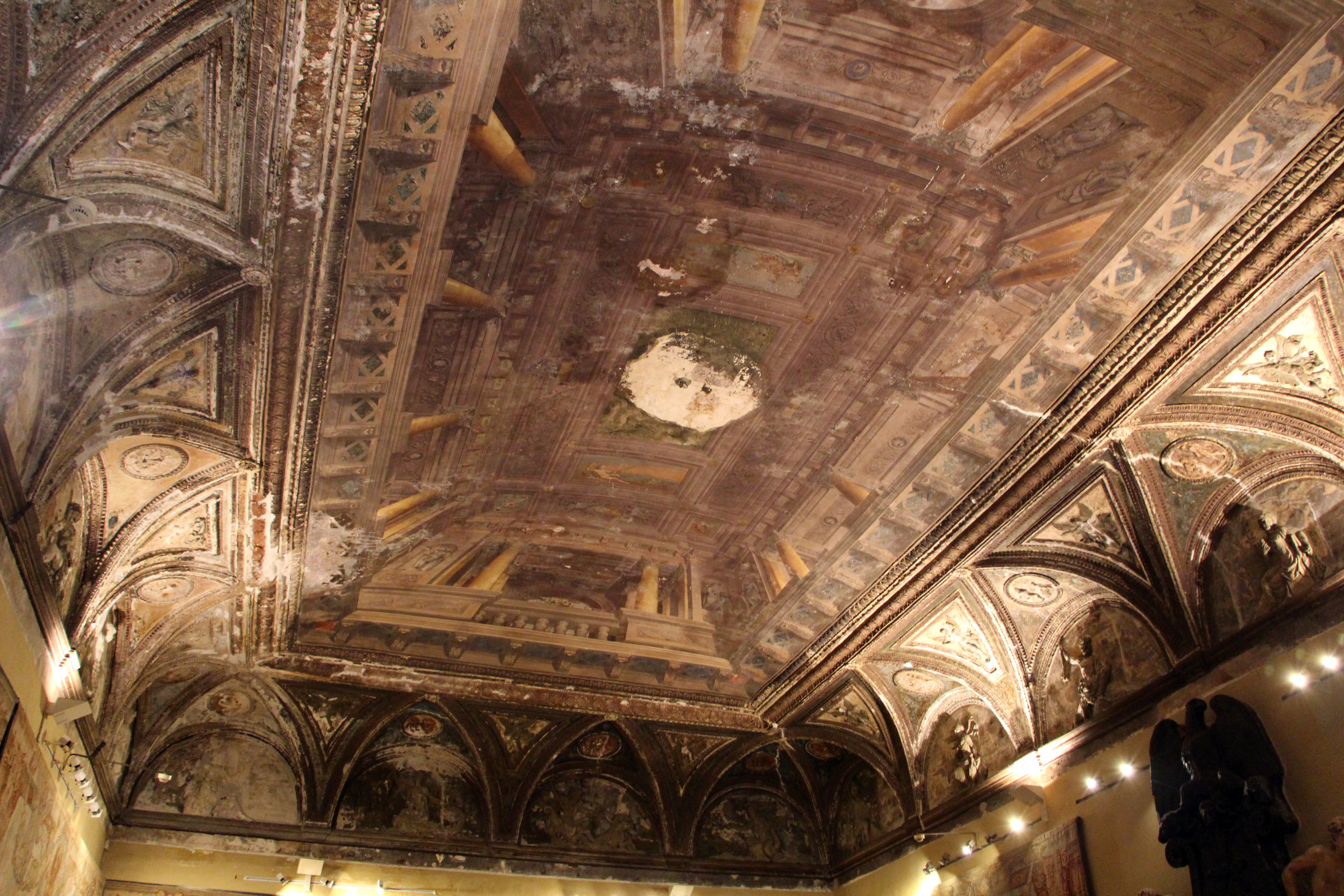
Frescos by Angelini, substituting lost Perin del Vaga frescos in Villa del Principe, Genoa

Annibale Angelini (May 12, 1812 in Perugia – July 19, 1884) was an Italian painter and scenographer.

== Biography ==
Angelini first trained at the Accademia di Belle Arti in Perugia; from here he moved to Florence, where he worked under Luigi Facchinelli, and focused on scenography after training under Alessandro Sanquirico. He also worked in Rome under Vincenzo Monotti and Tommaso Minardi, and attended the Accademia di San Luca.

For many years he was professor and honorary member of the Accademia di San Luca of Rome; he was decorated with the Ottoman Order of the Medjidie. Restored many frescoes, including many at the Vatican, including: Michelangelo's The Crucifixion of St Peter and The Conversion of Saul at the Capella Paolina. He restored frescoes by Ciro Ferri and Baciccia in the cupola di Sant'Agnese in Agone; and frescoes by Raphael at the Chigi Chapel in Santa Maria del Popolo.

He also frescoed several rooms of the Palaces Quirinale, Doria, Massimo, Lancillotti, Torlonia, Chigi, Del Drago; and also retouched the decorations of the cupola of the Basilica of St Peter's, and the facade of the Duomo of Orvieto. In Orvieto he also provided scenography for the theater, working alongside Cesare Fracassini. Working alongside V. Baldini, he also contributed scenography for theaters in Bologna, Perugia, Ancona, Rome, and Ferrara. He decorated the wooden coffered ceiling of the Summer Hall of the Government Congregation in the Pallazo dei Priori in Perugia, where his flair for fantasy is the highlight. He published a text on prospective (Trattato teorico-pratico di prospettiva, 2 volumes. Rome, 1861–62), which was helpful in practical decoration of architectural scenes. He also made copies of paintings and frescoes of Pierino del Vega in Genoa.

For the House of Savoy, he painted The Return of Amedeo VI from the Crusade, and other paintings for the Royal Palace of Turin. He often painted vedute with architecture. At the Exhibition of Fine Arts of Perugia of 1879, he was awarded a gold medal of Gold awarded by the Ministry of Public Education and presented by King Vittorio Emanuele III.
