= Parlatore =

Parlatore is an Italian surname. Notable people with the surname include:

- Filippo Parlatore (1816–1877), Italian botanist
- Modesto Parlatore (1849–1912), Italian sculptor and architect
- Tim Parlatore, American lawyer
