= Marco Quinto Vigerio della Rovere =

Italian Roman Catholic prelate

Most Reverend Marco Quinto Vigerio della Rovere
- Bishop of Senigallia
- Church: Catholic Church
- Diocese: Diocese of Senigallia
- In office: 1513–1560
- Predecessor: Marco Vigerio della Rovere
- Successor: Urbano Vigerio della Rovere

Personal details
- Died: 1560

Marco Quinto Vigerio della Rovere (died 1560) was a Roman Catholic prelate who served as Bishop of Senigallia (1513–1560).

== Biography ==
On 9 May 1513, Marco Quinto Vigerio della Rovere was appointed during the papacy of Pope Leo X as Bishop of Senigallia. He served as Bishop of Senigallia until his death in 1560.

== External links and additional sources ==
- Cheney, David M. "Diocese of Senigallia". Catholic-Hierarchy.org. (for Chronology of Bishops) ^{[self-published]}
- Chow, Gabriel. "Diocese of Senigallia (Italy)". GCatholic.org. (for Chronology of Bishops) ^{[self-published]}

Catholic Church titles
Preceded by Marco Vigerio della Rovere	Bishop of Senigallia; 1513–1560	Succeeded by Urbano Vigerio della Rovere
