= Modesto Parlatore =

Italian sculptor and architect

Modesto Parlatore (Orsogna, Province of Chieti, 5 March 1849 – 6 March 1912) was an Italian sculptor and architect.

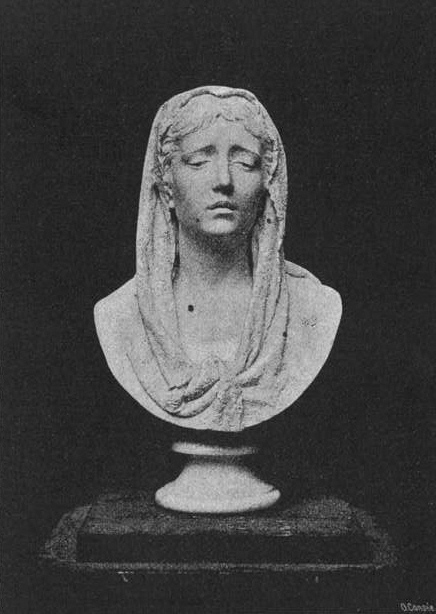
Sadness

In 1870, Parlatore was awarded a stipend from the city of Orsogna to study in Rome, and enrolled in the Institute of Fine Arts under the professor Tito Angelini. There he dedicated himself to sculpture and architecture. In Rome, he was encouraged by the painter Annibale Angelini. He exhibited in his early years a Bust of a widow, Bust of Old Man, a bronze Bust of King Umberto, and one of General Garibaldi. In 1877, he was awarded first prize for a work in the Exposition at Geneva, Switzerland.

He completed designs, never built, for a Monument to the Hero of Caprera (Garibaldi), to be erected in Chieti, and for a Monument to Quintino Sella. His Ad comilia was built depicting a young masculine ancient Roman citizen. He worked as an architect in many restorations, and served on may commission to examine designs of monuments, including the commission to evaluate a monument to Vittorio Emanuele II that was erected in Spoleto. However, when he complained of possible corruption in the selection process, he was shunned from official commissions in Rome.

In the 21st century, a series of works and models by Parlatore donated to his province were gathered in an annex to the Museo Orsognese Arte Musica, located in the Torre Di Bene in Orsogna. Among the sculptures are four lif-size stucco statues: La Sorpresa, Il Ravvedimento, Il Fromboliere, and Vir Plebeus Ad Forum; a stucco bas-relief depicting San Rocco tra gli appestati; a heraldic shield of the town of Guardiagrele; and ten half-busts in bronze, stucco, and terracotta.

Parlatore sculpted a plaque dedicated to the Italian soldiers fallen during the 19th century subjugation of Ethiopia (Monument to Caduti di Saati e Dogali, 1887) located near the church of Santa Chiara of Lanciano, located where there previously were barracks for a contingent that had died in the conflict.
