= Fabrizio Sceberras Testaferrata =

Maltese bishop

His Eminence Fabrizio Sceberras Testaferrata
- Cardinal Bishop of Senigallia
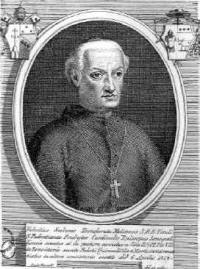
- Cardinal Sceberras Testaferrata
- Church: Roman Catholic
- Diocese: Roman Catholic Diocese of Senigallia
- Installed: 6 April 1818
- Term ended: 3 August 1843
- Predecessor: Annibale Francesco Clemente Melchiore Girolamo Nicola della Genga
- Successor: Antonio Maria Cagiano de Azevedo
- Other post: Cardinal-Priest of S. Pudenziana
- Previous posts: Apostolic Nuncio to Switzerland (1803-1815); Secretary of the Congregation of Bishops and Regulars (1815-1818)

Orders
- Ordination: 1802
- Consecration: 21 December 1802
- Created cardinal: 1818 by Pope Pius VII
- Rank: Cardinal

Personal details
- Born: 1 April 1757 Birgu, Hospitaller Malta
- Died: 3 August 1843 (aged 86) Senigallia, Papal States
- Buried: Senigallia Cathedral
- Parents: Pasquale Sceberras Testaferrata; Lucrezia Dorell

Fabrizio Sceberras Testaferrata (1 April 1757 - 3 August 1843) was a native of Malta and a bishop and cardinal of the Catholic Church. He was Bishop of Senigallia from 1818 until his death in 1843.

== Biography ==
Testaferrata was born to a noble family in Valletta, Malta, on 1 April 1757. The date of his ordination is unknown, but he was ordained at the Collegio Clementino in Rome before being named a canon of Malta's cathedral in 1776. Popes Pius VI and Pius VII assigned him positions of increasing responsibility as administrator of ecclesiastical territories in Italy.

On 20 September 1802, Pope Pius VII appointed him titular archbishop of Berytus. Testaferrata was consecrated a bishop by Cardinal Giuseppe Doria Pamphili on 21 December 1802. In 1803, he was appointed Apostolic Nuncio to Switzerland. In 1815 he was appointed Secretary of the Congregation of Bishops and Regulars.

Pope Pius VII made him a cardinal in pectore, that is, without public announcement, in 1816 and then on 6 April 1818 named him Cardinal Priest of Santa Pudenziana. He was the first Maltese to become a member of the College of Cardinals. That same day he was appointed Bishop of Senigallia, Italy.

Testaferrata participated in the conclaves that elected Pope Leo XII in 1823, Pope Pius VIII in 1829, and Pope Gregory XVI in 1830–31.

He died on 3 August 1843 and was buried in the Cathedral of Senigallia.

== See also ==
- Catholic Church in Italy
