= Guidi di Bagno =

Italian noble family

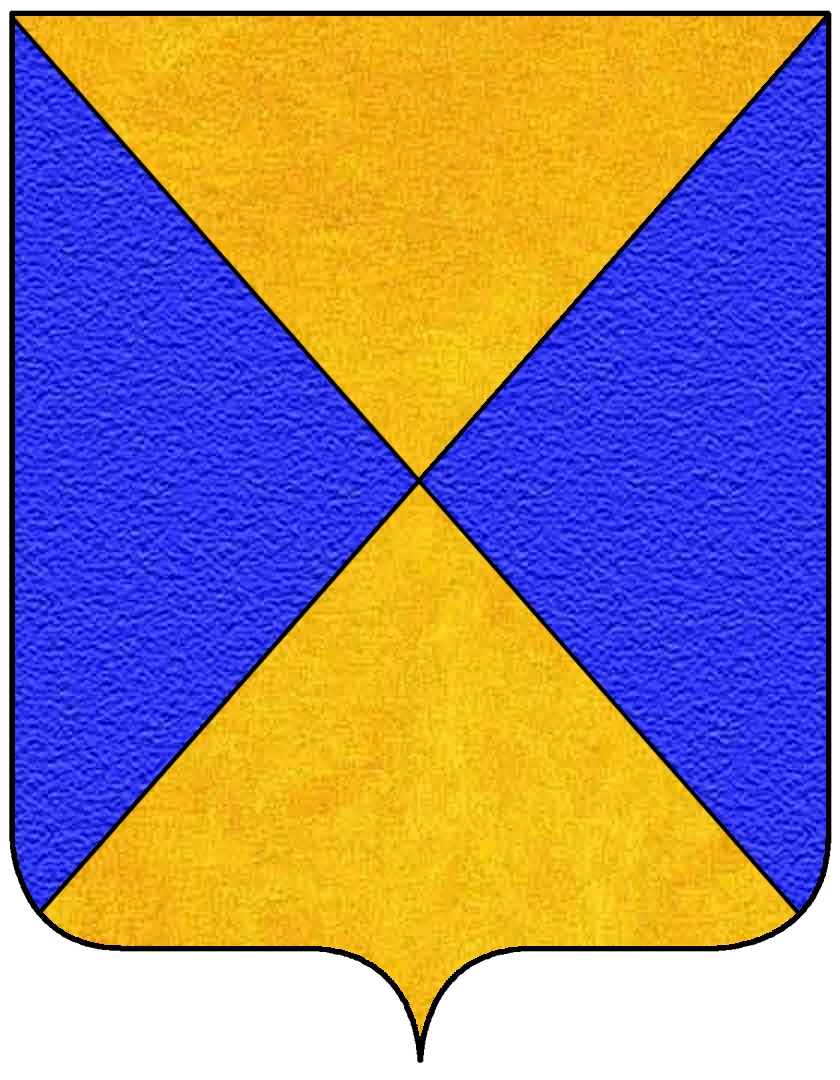
- Guidi di Bagno family coat of arms

Origin
- Region of origin: Mantua, Italy

The House of Guidi di Bagno is an old Italian noble family which moved first into Romagna (Bagno di Romagna) and then into Mantua from the 14th century.

== History and famous personalities ==
The branch of the family originated from Riccardo Count Guidi di Bagno who married Philippa Gonzaga di Novellara, niece of Feltrino Gonzaga.

Among the most important leaders of this family, it may be noted:

- Tegrimo di Bagno, Progenitor and founder of the Family;
- Riccardo di Bagno (15th century), expelled from Florence and settled in Mantua under the protection of Bonacolsi family;
- Guido di Riccardo di Bagno (15th century), called "Guidone", he obtained by decree in 1422 the Mantuan citizenship for himself and his descendants;
- Gianfrancesco di Bagno (15th century), Condottiere at the service of Federico da Montefeltro. For distinguishing himself against Sigismondo Pandolfo Malatesta he received as a reward from Pius II in June 1464, the title of count of Montebello (it), and its castles, giving rise, from this date, to the line of the Bagno of Montebello;
- Roberto Guidi di Bagno (15th century), Knight who perished in the battle of Fornovo in 1495;
- Ludovico Guidi di Bagno (15th century), Dean of the Cathedral of Mantua;
- Camillo Guidi di Bagno (16th century), Squire of Cosimo I de' Medici, High Chancellor of the Order of Saint Stephen (Sacro Militare Ordine di Santo Stefano Papa e Martire), died in mysterious circumstances;
- Giovanni Francesco Guidi di Bagno (1578-1641), cardinal;
- Nicola Guidi di Bagno (1583-1663), cardinal;
- Giovanfrancesco Guidi di Bagno, (18th century), Courtier and Chamberlain of Ferdinando Carlo Gonzaga, Duke of Mantua and Montferrat;
- Antonio Guidi di Bagno (it) (1683-1761), Bishop of Mantua from 1719 to 1761, who restored the facade of Mantua Cathedral by embellishing it with marble;
- Galeazzo Di Bagno (it) (1825-1893), politician, secretary of Ettore Magnagutti, Mayor of Mantua;
