= Nicola Guidi di Bagno =

Italian cardinal (1583–1663)

His Eminence Nicola Guidi di Bagno
- Cardinal priest of Sant'Eusebio; Archbishop-Bishop of Senigallia
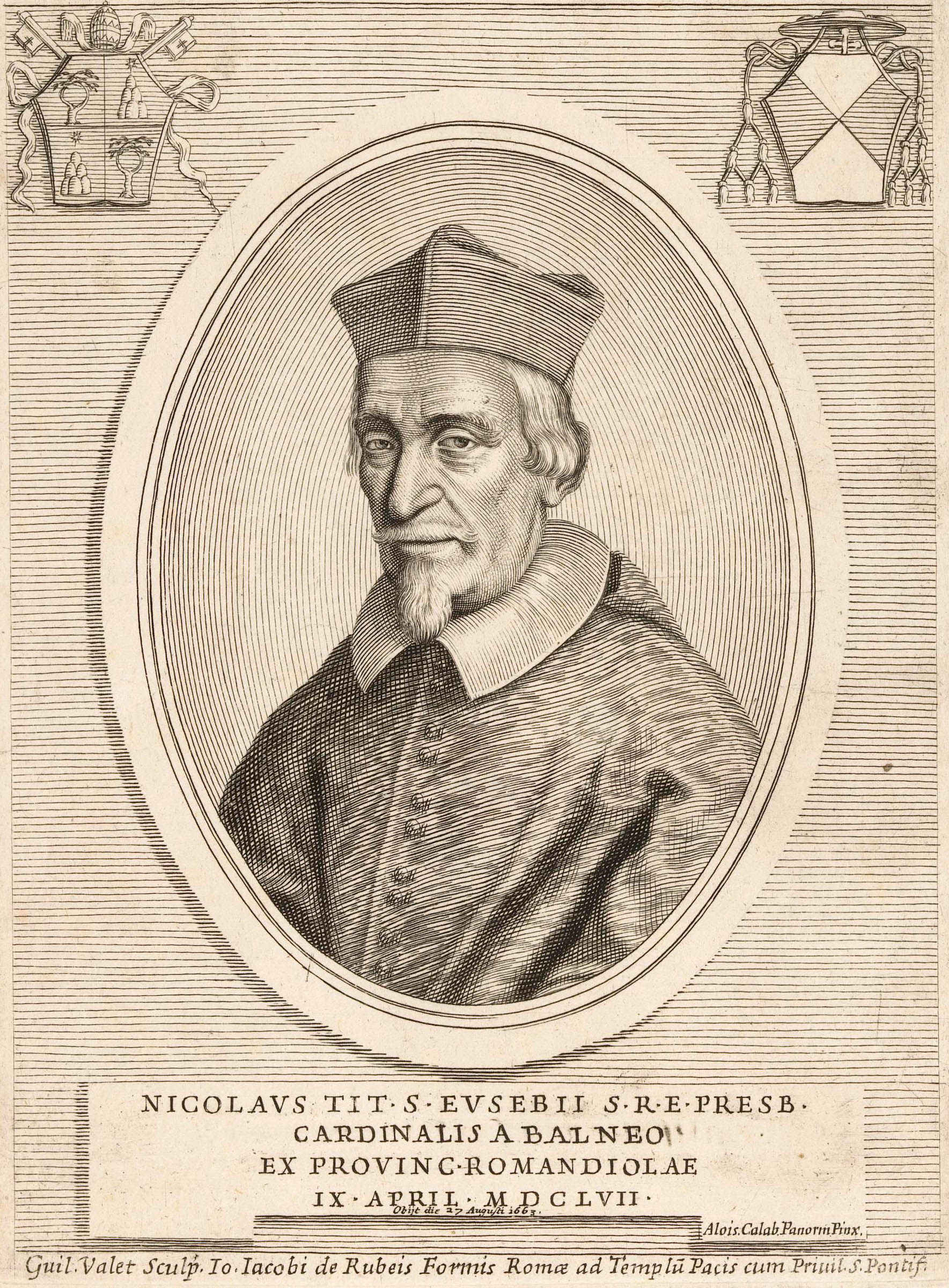
- Guillaume Vallet - Nicola Guidi di Bagno
- See: Senigallia; Titular Archbishop of Athens
- Installed: 28 May 1658— resigned 1 September 1659
- Predecessor: Francesco Cherubini
- Successor: Claudio Marazzani
- Other post: Apostolic Nuncio to France (1644–1656)

Orders
- Consecration: by Antonio Marcello Barberini
- Created cardinal: 9 April 1657

Personal details
- Born: 1583 Mantua, Italy
- Died: 27 August 1663 (aged 80) Rome

Nicola Guidi di Bagno or Nicolò Guidi di Bagno (Mantua, Italy, 1583) was a titular archbishop of Atenia, bishop of Senigallia, and a cardinal. He descended from a noble family. His brother Gianfrancesco Guidi di Bagno and his uncle Girolamo Colonna were also cardinals.

== Early life and studies ==
He was the son of Fabrizio Guidi di Bagno, Marquess of Montebello, Province of Rimini, and Laura Colonna from the Duchy of Zagarolo.

He studied physics, then married. After joining the papal army, he was named general of the papal troops in Marca d'Ancona and held the post for seven years. After his wife died, he left the military life to enter the ecclesiastical state. Late he became nuncio to Tuscany.

== Episcopate ==
He was appointed titular archbishop of Athens on 15 March 1644. He was consecrated a bishop in Rome on 29 March 1644 by Cardinal Antonio Barberini.

He was named Apostolic Nuncio to France on 23 April 1644, where he served until December 1656.

== Cardinalate ==
Nicola Guidi di Bagno was created cardinal priest in the consistory of 9 April 1657 by Pope Alexander VII and was assigned the title of Sant'Eusebio. On 28 May 1658 he was transferred to the Diocese of Senigallia, but he resigned from that bishopric on 1 September 1659.

Cardinal Guidi died in Rome on 27 August 1663.
