= Sala Regia (Vatican) =

State hall in the Apostolic Palace, Vatican City

Coordinates: 41°54′10″N 12°27′17″E

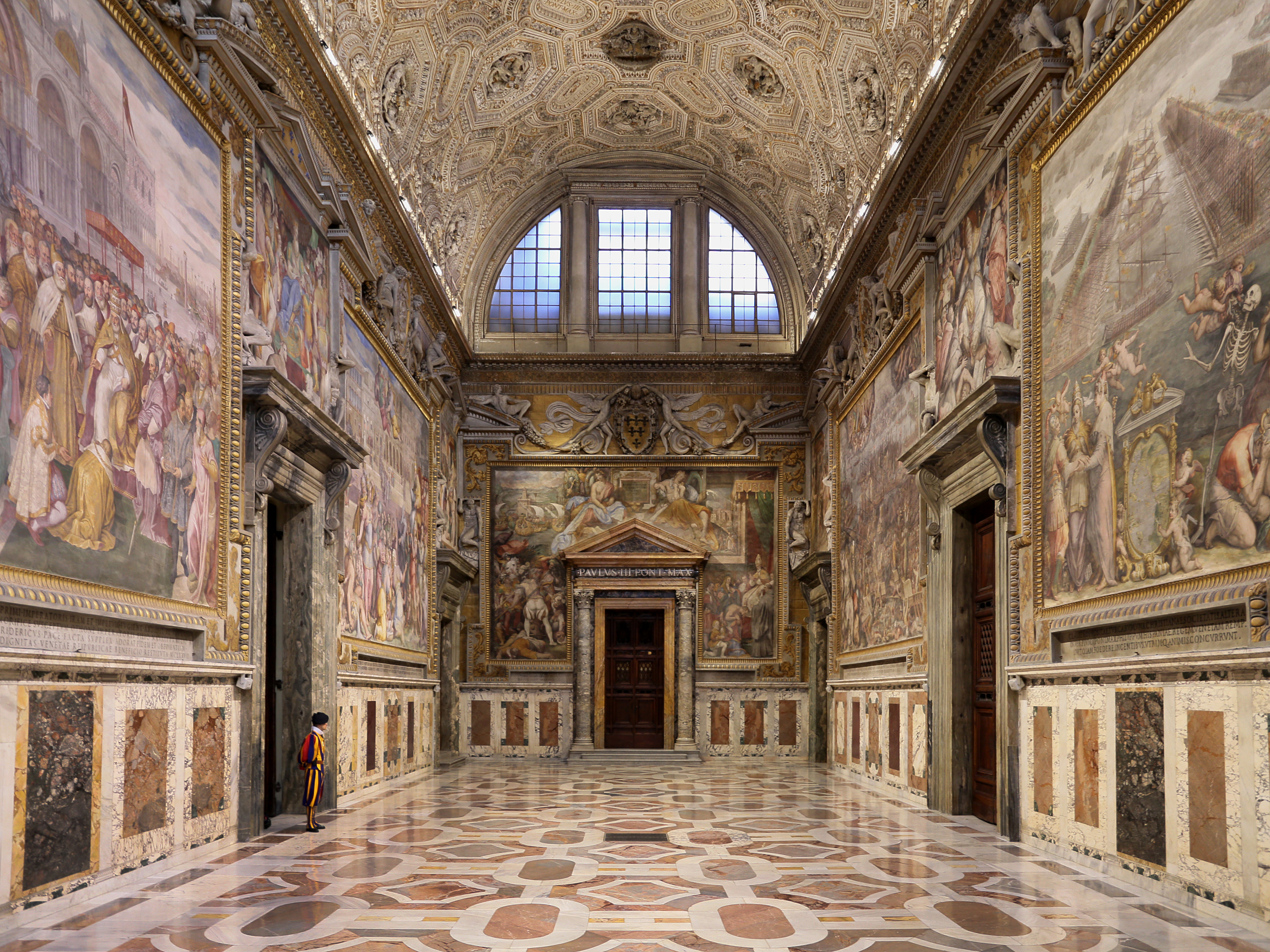
Sala Regia. At the end of the hall is the entrance to the Pauline Chapel.

The Sala Regia ('Regal Room') is a state hall in the Apostolic Palace in Vatican City.

Although not intended as such, this broad room is really an antechamber to the Sistine Chapel. It also connects to the Pauline Chapel and is reached by the long staircase known as the Scala Regia. To the left of the entrance formerly stood the papal throne, which is now at the opposite side before the door leading to the Pauline Chapel.

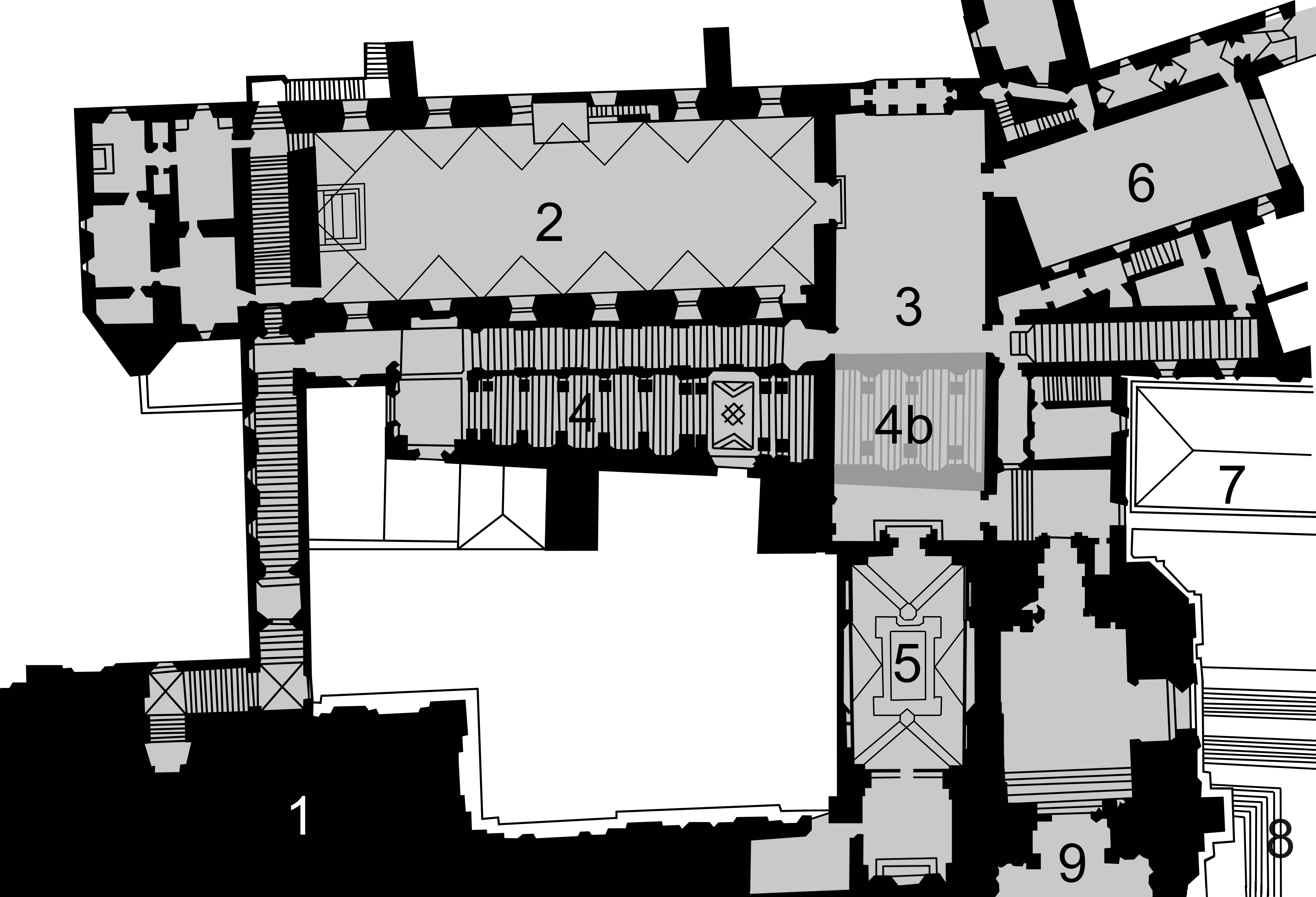
Map of the Apostolic Palace: 1-St.Peter's basilica 2-Sistine Chapel 3-Sala Regia 4,4b-Scala Regia 5-Pauline Chapel 6-Sala Ducale 7-Corridor of Bernini 8-St.Peter's Square 9-St.Peter's vestibule.

The hall was begun under Pope Paul III by Antonio da Sangallo the Younger and was completed in 1573. The elegant barrel vault is graced by the very impressive plaster decorations of Perino del Vaga. The stucco ornaments over the doors are by Daniele da Volterra. By 2019, the room and staircase were open to tourists who visit the Apostolic Palace.

The walls were decorated by Livio Agresti, Giorgio Vasari and Taddeo Zuccari. The frescoes depict momentous turning-points in the history of the Church, including the return of Pope Gregory XI from Avignon to Rome, the Battle of Lepanto, three panels narrating events surrounding the St. Bartholomew's Day massacre, the raising of the ban from Henry IV, the reconciliation of Pope Alexander III with Frederick Barbarossa and Peter II of Aragon offering the Kingdom to Pope Innocent III.

The hall was originally used for the reception of princes and royal ambassadors, hence its name. Consistories were held in it, but were later transferred to the Saint Peter's Basilica on November 19, 2016, and the area has also housed occasional musical recitals in the presence of the pontiff; during a conclave it was used as a promenade for the cardinals.

== Gallery ==
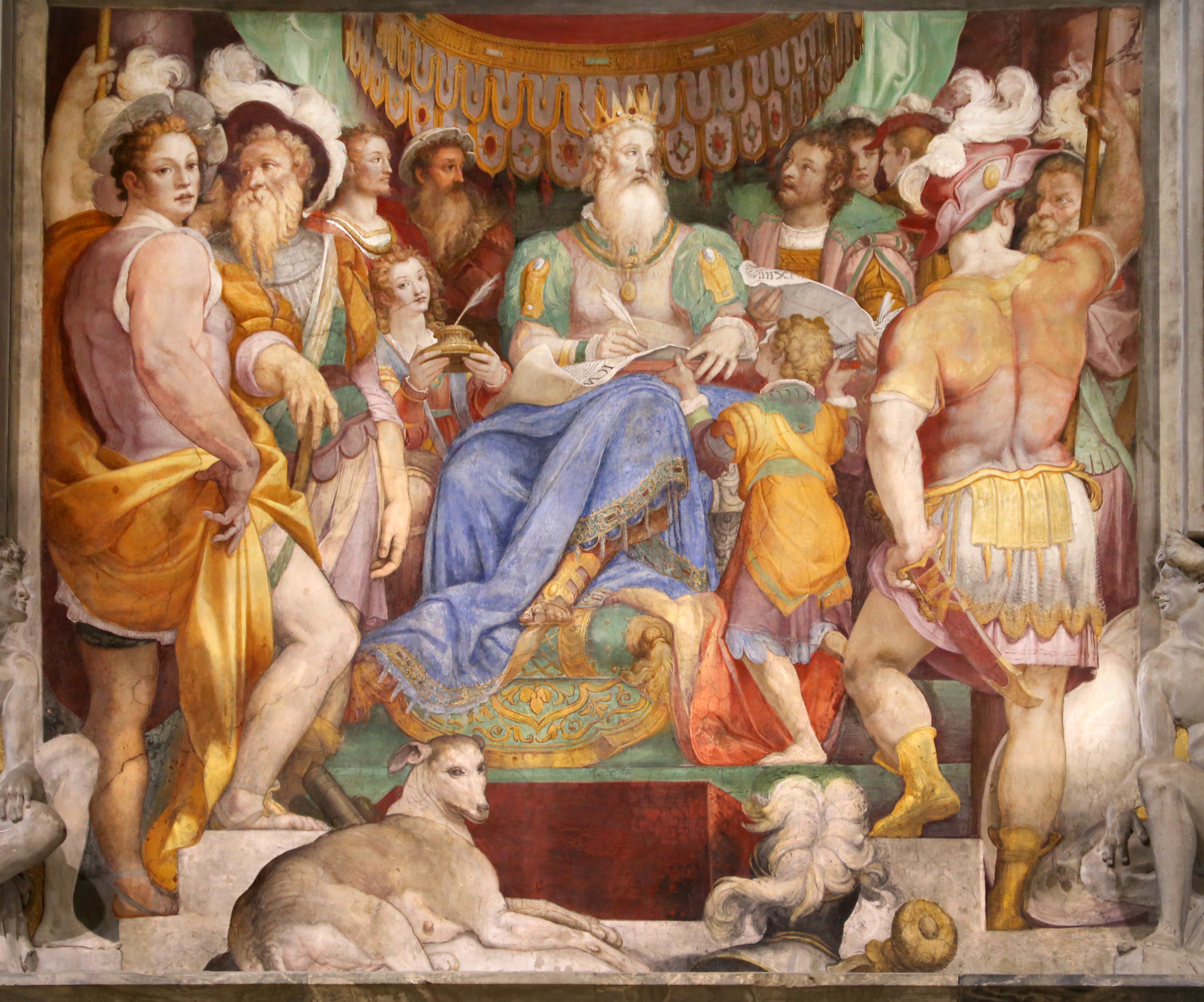
Charlemagne confirms the Donation of Ravenna by Taddeo Zuccari

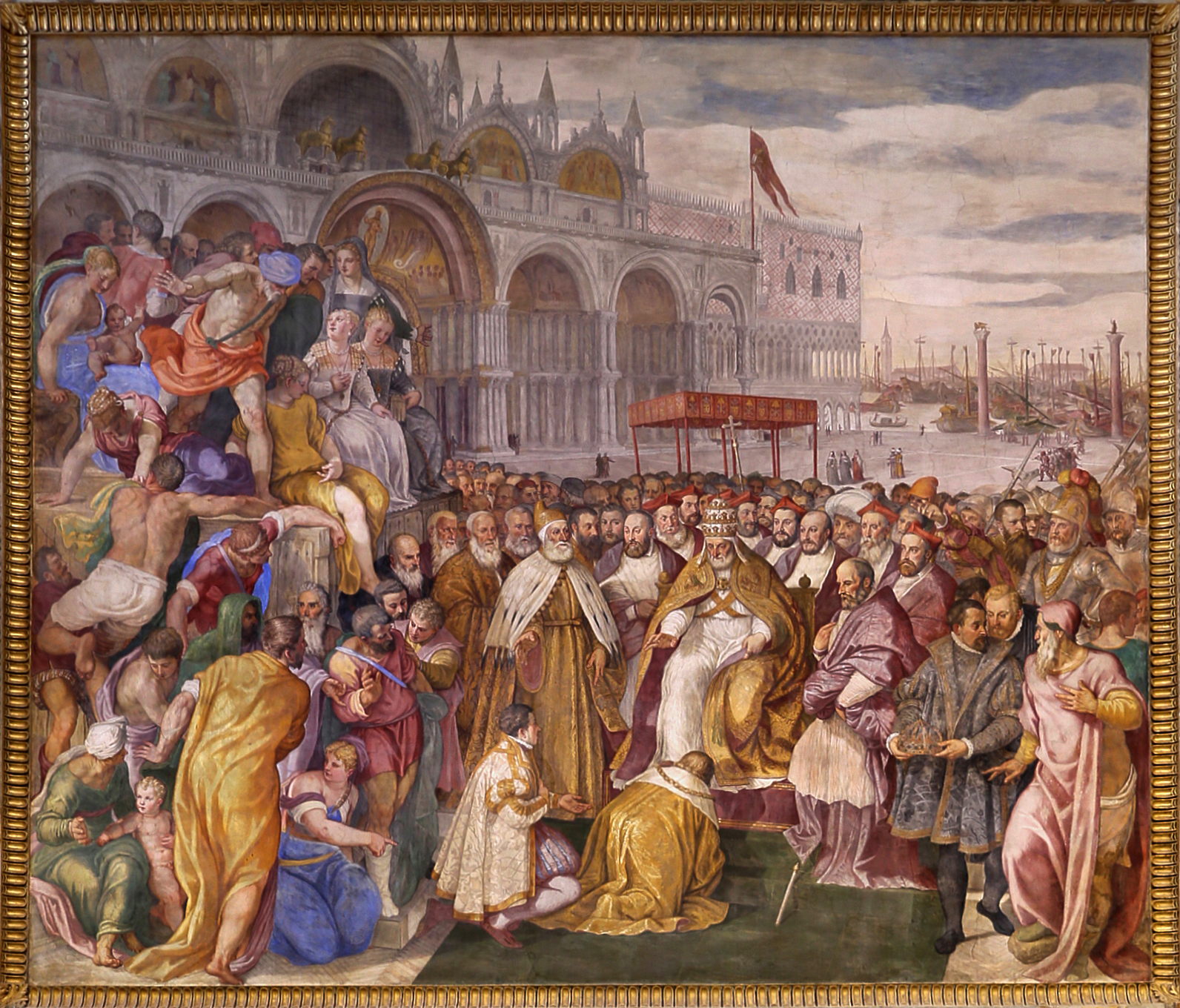
Submission of Frederick Barbarossa before Pope Alexander III during the signing of the Treaty of Venice by Giuseppe Salviati (Giuseppe Porta)

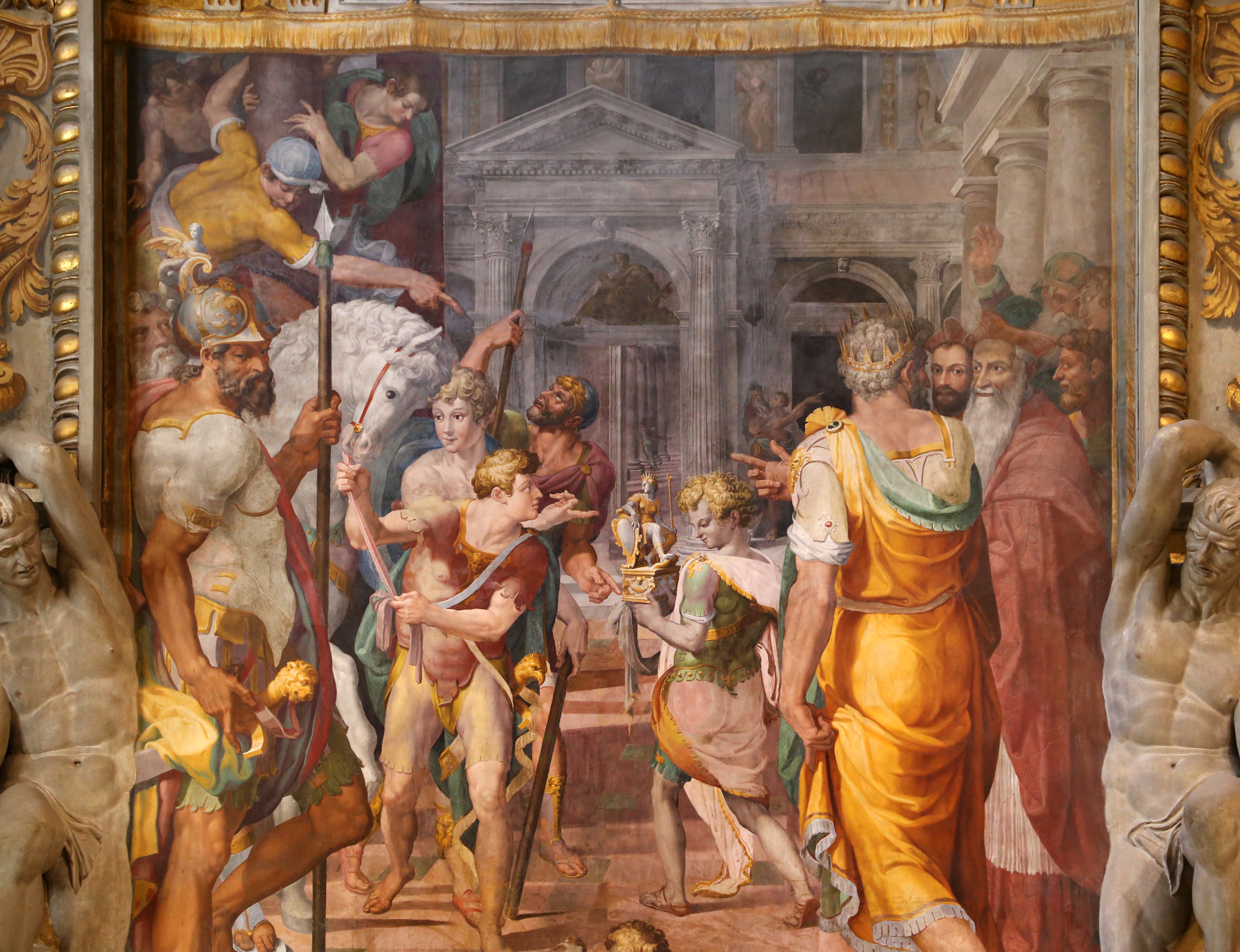
King Peter II of Aragon offers his kingdom to Pope Innocent III by Livio Agresti

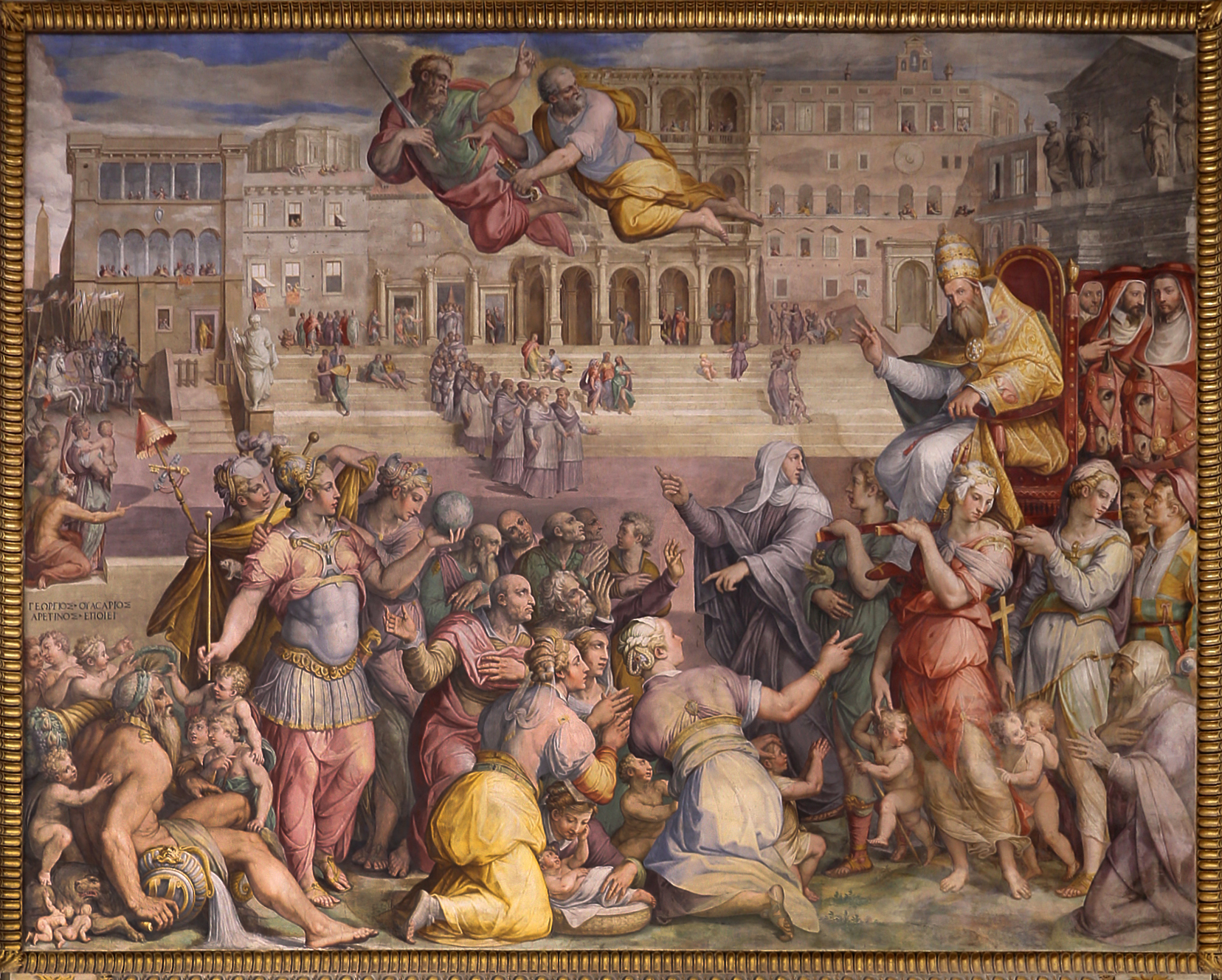
Pope Gregory XI returns to Rome from Avignon by Vasari

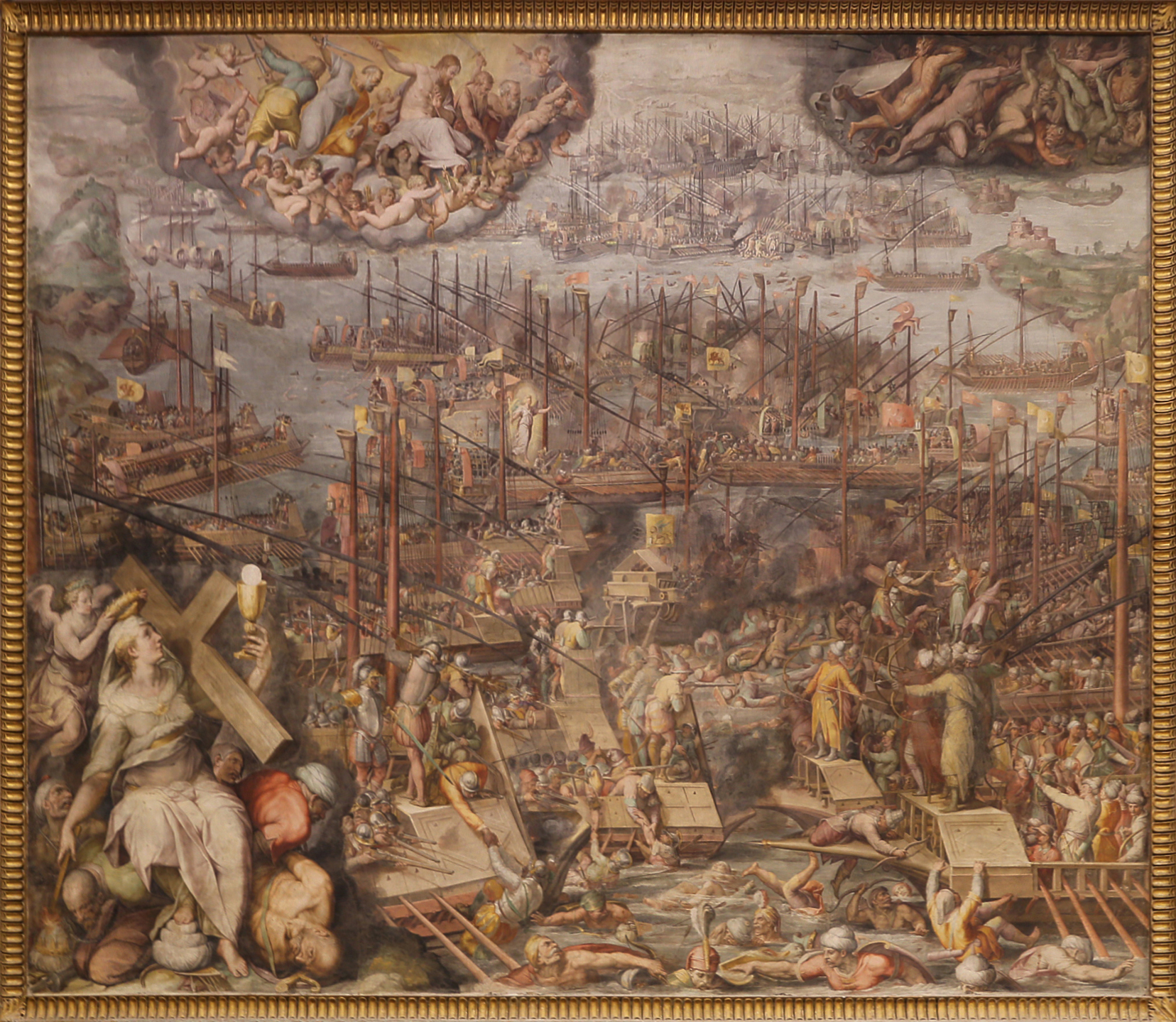
Battle of Lepanto by Giorgio Vasari

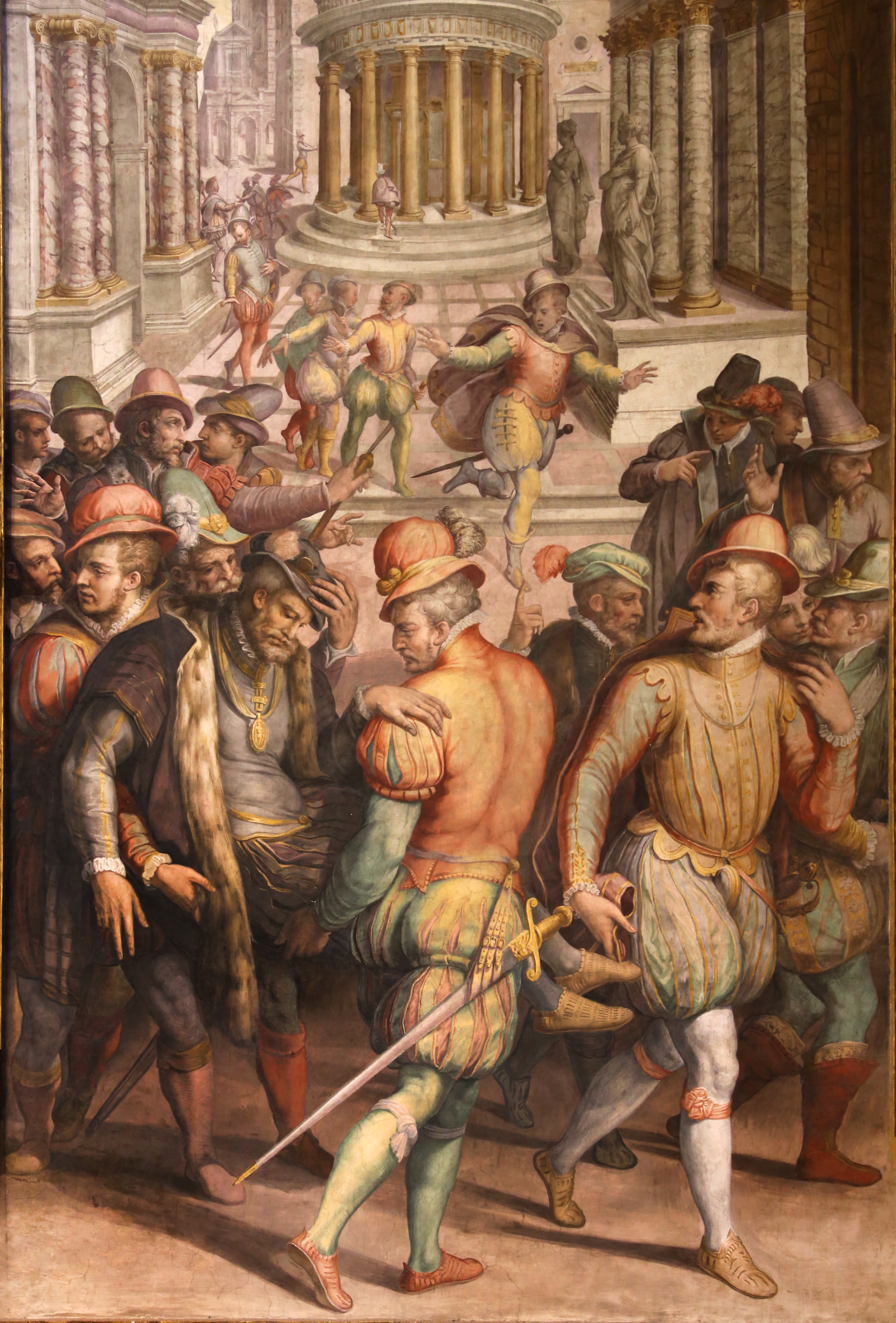
Admiral Coligny is wounded before Massacre of St Bartholemew by Vasari

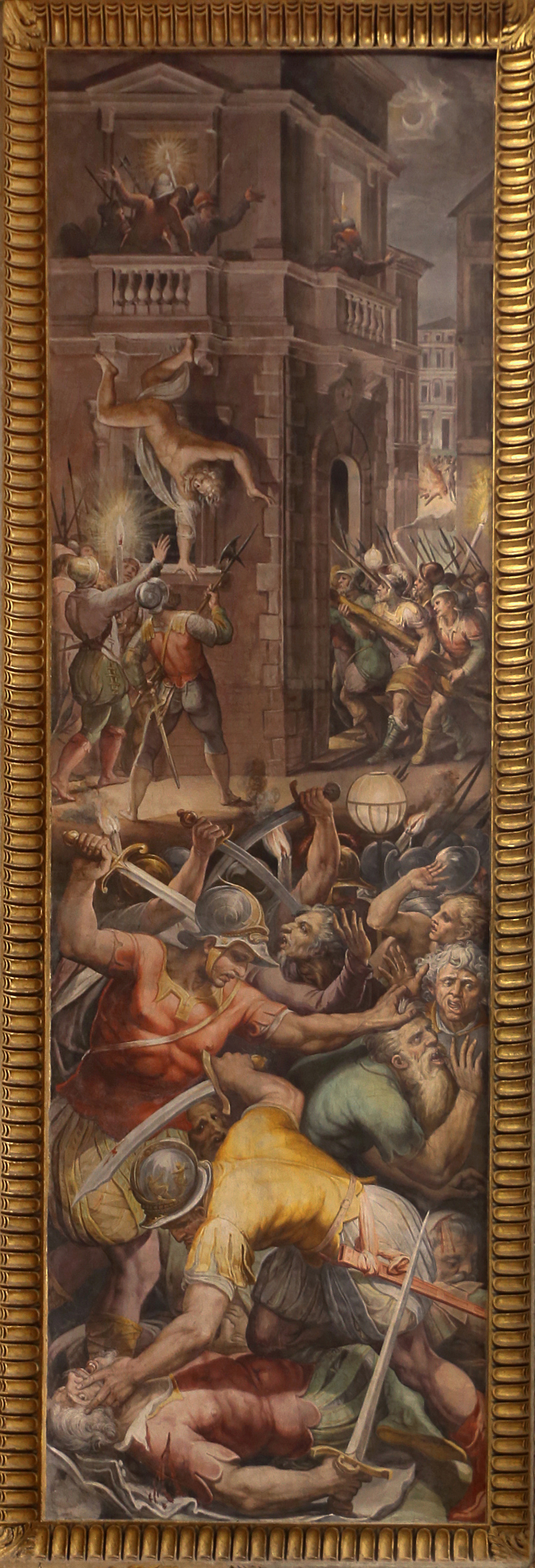
Defenestration of Coligny and Massacre of St Bartholemew by Vasari

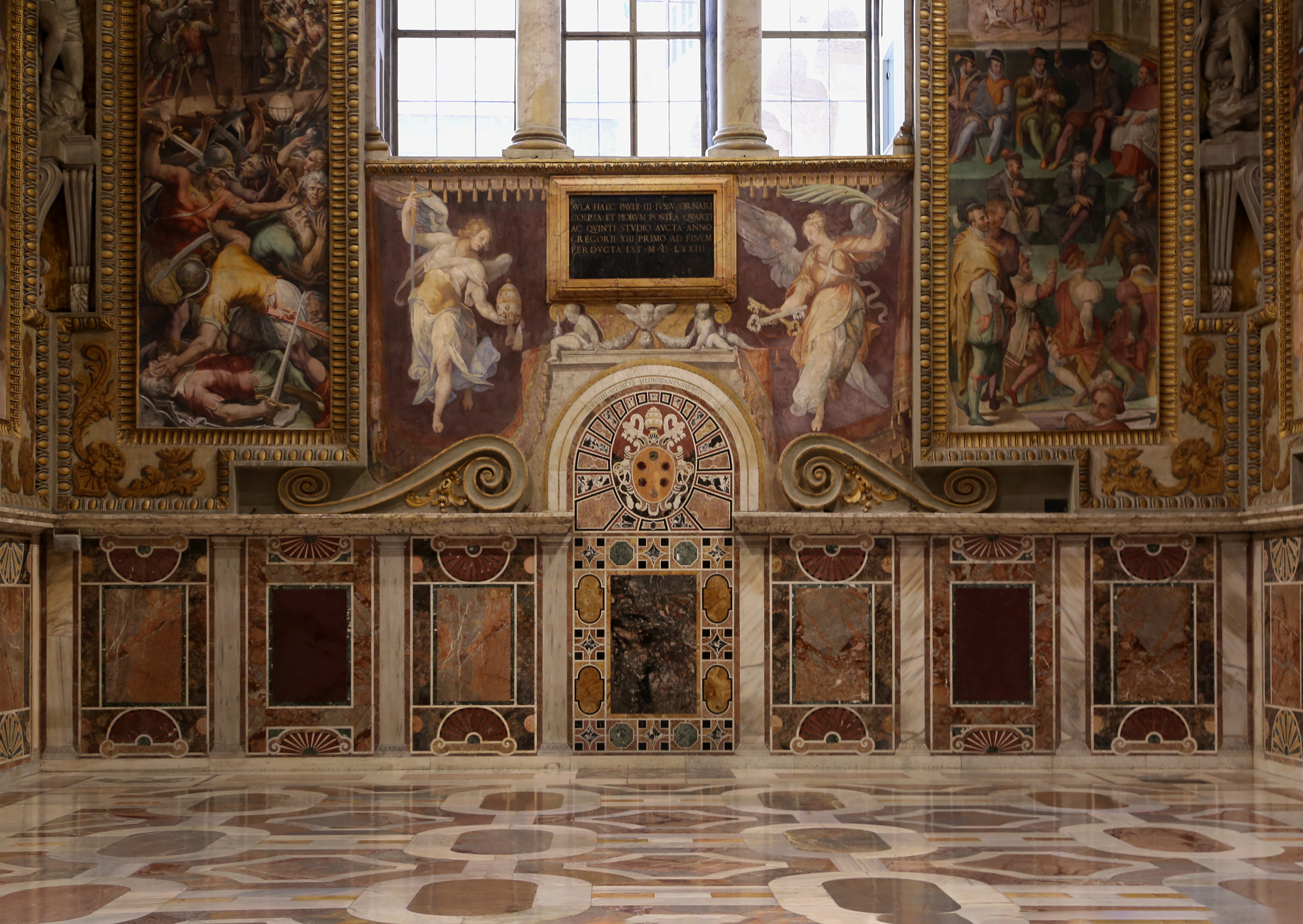
Paintings and Marble on northern wall

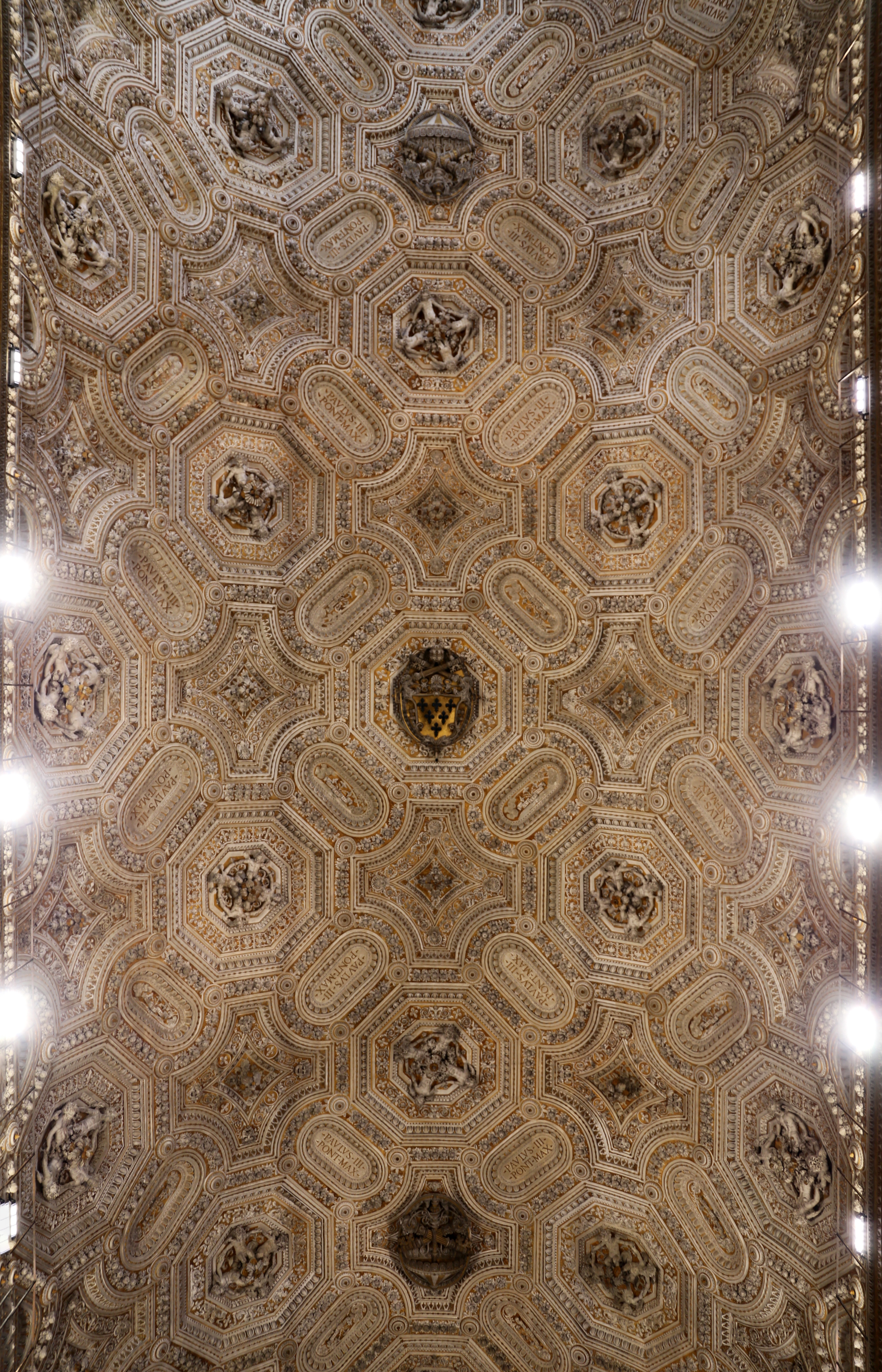
Ceiling stuccos by Perin del Vaga

== See also ==
- Index of Vatican City-related articles
