= Francesco Cherubini =

Italian cardinal (1585–1656)

- Cardinal, Bishop of Senigallia
- Church: Catholic Church
- See: Senigallia
- Appointed: 2 August 1655
- Term ended: 24 April 1656
- Predecessor: Cesare Facchinetti
- Successor: Nicola Guidi di Bagno
- Other post: Cardinal Priest of San Giovanni a Porta Latina

Orders
- Consecration: 8 Aug 1655 (Bishop) by Marco Antonio Franciotti
- Created cardinal: 7 October 1647 by Pope Innocent X

Personal details
- Born: 1585 Montalboddo
- Died: 24 April 1656 (aged 70–71) Senigallia

Francesco Cherubini (1585 – 24 April 1656) was a Catholic cardinal who served as Bishop of Senigallia.

== Life ==
Francesco Cherubini was born in Montalboddo, near Senigallia in the Papal States in 1585. He completed his studies in Rome, earning a doctorate in utroque iure. In Rome, he became assistant of Giovanni Battista Pamphilj, and followed the Pamphilj in his Nunciature in Naples (1621–1625) and in Spain (1626–1630). In March 1643, he was made Referendary of the Tribunals of the Apostolic Signature of Justice and of Grace.

A turning point in the life of Francesco Cherubini was the elevation of Giovanni Battista Pamphilj to the papacy as Pope Innocent X in September 1644; he continued to collaborate and to stay near the pope.

On 7 October 1647, Pope Innocent X appointed him Cardinal priest with the title of San Giovanni a Porta Latina. At the death of Innocent X, Cherubini participated in the Papal conclave, 1655.

A few months after that conclave, the new pope Alexander VII appointed Francesco Cherubini as bishop of Senigallia. The episcopal consecration followed on 8 August 1655 in the Roman Church of Church of the Gesù by the hands of Cardinal Marco Antonio Franciotti.

Moved to Senigallia, Francesco Cherubini died some months later, on 24 April 1656. He was buried in the church of S. Croce of "Quattro Colonne", in his native town, Montalboddo.
