= Diocese of Senigallia =

Latin Catholic diocese in Italy

Coordinates: 43.7131°N 13.2183°E

Diocese of Senigallia Dioecesis Senogalliensis

Catholic
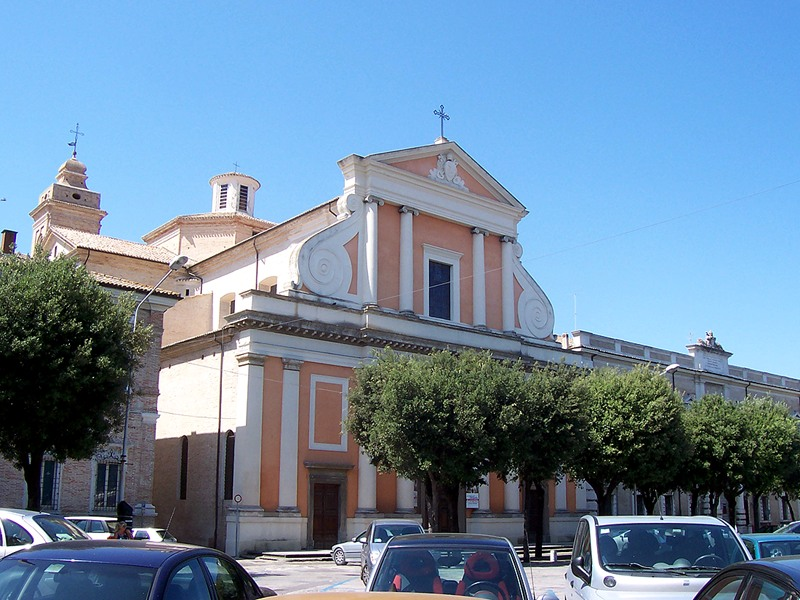
- Cathedral of Senigallia

Location
- Country: Italy
- Ecclesiastical province: Ancona-Osimo

Statistics
- Area: 580 km^{2} (220 sq mi)
- Population: Total; Catholics: (as of 2020); 130,500; 121,345 (93%)
- Parishes: 57

Information
- Denomination: Catholic Church
- Sui iuris church: Latin Church
- Rite: Roman Rite
- Established: 6th Century
- Cathedral: Basilica Cattedrale di S. Pietro Apostolo
- Secular priests: 71 (diocesan); 10 (religious Orders); 15 Permanent Deacons

Current leadership
- Pope: Leo XIV
- Bishop: Francesco Manenti
- Bishops emeritus: Giuseppe Orlandoni

Map
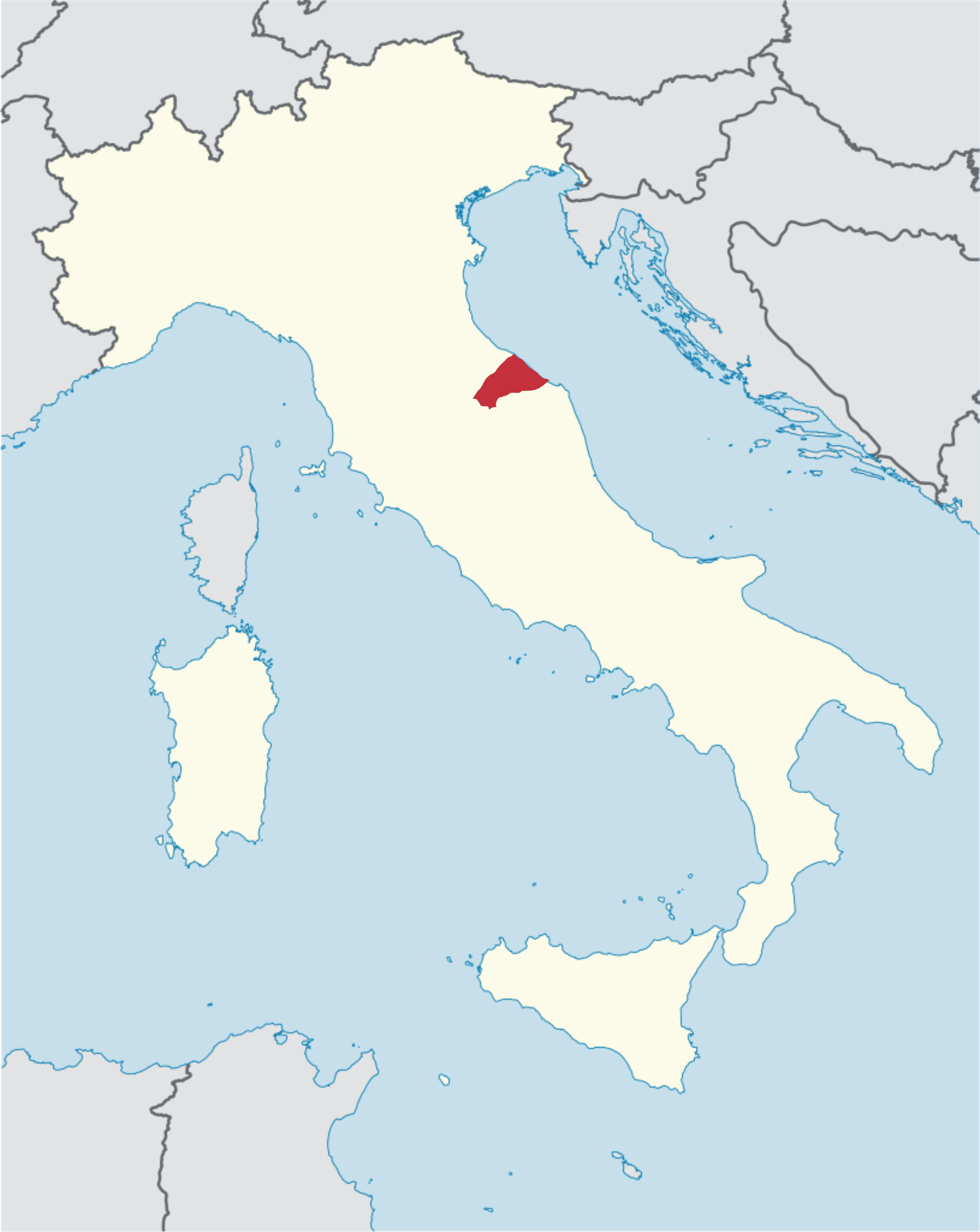

Website
- www.diocesisenigallia.it

The Diocese of Senigallia (Latin: Dioecesis Senogalliensis) is a Latin Church diocese of the Catholic Church in the Marche, Italy. It has existed since the sixth century. It is a suffragan of the archdiocese of Ancona-Osimo.

== History ==
The patron saint of Senigallia is a St. Paulinus, whose remains are said to be preserved in the cathedral (as is attested for the first time in 1397). There is no evidence that he was ever a bishop. He is, therefore, not identical with Paulinus of Nola, nor is it known to what epoch he belongs. The first bishop of certain date was Venantius (502).

Under Bishop Sigismundus (c. 590) the putative relics of St. Gaudentius, Bishop of Rimini and martyr, which had mysteriously been transported by sea, were brought to Senigallia.

In the 1050s, the bishop of Fossombrone complained to Pope Victor II (1054–1057) about the poverty of his diocese. In reply the pope granted him the church of S. Giovanni in Sorbitulo, with all of its property and income, as well as spiritual jurisdiction. The grant was immediately contested by Guglielmo, Bishop of Senigallia, and the litigation continued until 15 May 1070, when it was settled in favor of Fossombrone by Pope Alexander II, who confirmed the transfer of the church of S. Giovanni as well as the other churches in the massa Sorbituli. Senigallia therefore lost a not inconsiderable territory and income.

In 1264, King Manfred of Sicily, the son of the Emperor Frederick II, was fighting against a "Crusade" organized by Pope Urban IV and the son of King Louis VIII of France, Charles of Anjou, to overthrow him. To assist him he brought in Saracen troops from south Italy and north Africa. Under the command of Percivalle Doria, these joined with the Ghibbelines of Senigallia in furious fighting and acts of revenge which left the city of Senigallia and all of its larger buildings in ruins. Bishop Jacopo rebuilt the cathedral which had been destroyed by the troops of King Manfred. It was consecrated by Bishop Filippo on 4 May 1271.

=== Schism of 1328–1330 ===
In 1328, Senigallia became involved in the fourteen-year-long feud between Pope John XXII, who had supported Frederick von Hohenstaufen for the dignity of Holy Roman Emperor, and Louis of Bavaria, who defeated Frederick in war and successfully claimed the dignity. In vengeance, Pope John excommunicated him, and harassed him and his followers. In 1327, the Emperor Louis IV visited Italy, where he was crowned King of Italy at Milan on 31 May 1327. That winter he visited Rome, where he was recognized as Emperor and crowned on 17 January 1328, with the staunch and vocal opposition of the Guelph party. The Pope pronounced the coronation void, excommunicated Louis again, and ordered a Crusade against him. Louis replied by holding a parliament on 14 April and on 18 April, and had the Pope declared a heretic and deposed. A new pope was elected, the Franciscan Pietro Rinalducci (Rainalducci), who was called Nicholas V.

Nicholas and Louis began to take over the Church in Rome, central and northern Italy, and in Bavaria. Nicholas appointed seven cardinals, and attracted the bishops of Milano, Cremona, Como, Ferrara, Savona, Albenga, Genoa, Pisa, Lucca, Pistoia, Volterra, Arezzo, Borgo Sansepolcro, Bologna, Città di Castello, Viterbo, Todi, Bagnorea, Camerino, Osimo, Fermo, Urbino, Jesi, Fabriano, and Matelica to his schism. He also appointed new bishops for Osimo (Conradus Theutonicus, O.E.S.A.), Fermo (Vitalis of Urbino, O.Min.), and Senigallia (Thomas de Rocca of Matelica, O.E.S.A.).

To counter the schismatic advances in the March of Ancona, Pope John XXII, who had transferred Bishop Frederick of Senigallia to the diocese of Rimini (21 October 1328), on 7 November 1328 promoted the Franciscan, Giovanni of Ancona, the papal Inquisitor in the Marches of Ancona, to the diocese of Senigallia. In addition, in a letter of 25 January 1329, the Pope continued Bishop Giovanni in his office of Inquisitor of the March of Ancona, authorizing his powers to extend far beyond the diocese of Senigallia. The schism began to dissipate with the departure of Louis IV for Germany in April 1329, and then the surrender of Nicholas V to papal authorities in August 1330.

=== Suffragan ===
From time immemorial, the bishops of Senigallia had been directly subordinate (suffragans) of the Holy See (Papacy), with no supervisory archbishop intervening. But in 1563 the situation was altered. In his bull Super universas of 4 June 1563, Pope Pius IV reorganized the administration of the territories of the March of Ancona by creating a new archbishopric by elevating the bishop and diocese of Urbino. He created the new ecclesiastical province of Urbino, which was to include the dioceses of Cagli, Pesaro, Fossombrone, Montefeltro, Gubbio, and Senigallia.

From 1563 to 2000, therefore, the diocese of Senigallia was a suffragan of the archdiocese of Urbino. On 11 March 2000, by virtue of the Bull Quo maiori, Pope John Paul II created the new ecclesiastical province of Ancona-Osimo, and assigned it the dioceses of Fabriano-Matelica, Jesi, Loreto, and Senigallia

=== Cathedral and Chapter ===
In 1417, galleys and troops supplied by Galeazzo Malatesta of Pesaro and Carlo Malatesta of Rimini attacked Senigallia, as part of their plan to dominate the entire March of Ancona, and, with intermissions, held it under their control.

Under Bishop Antonio Colombella (1447–1466), Sigismondo Pandolfo Malatesta, lord of Senigallia and Rimini, made major efforts to improve the fortifications of the city of Senigallia, beginning in 1453. This involved the destruction of some properties belonging to the bishop in order to construct towers at appropriate strategic places, over which Bishop Colombella refused to compromise or cooperate. The flash-point was reached in 1456, when the Tower of S. Bartolomeo was begun opposite the episcopal palace. Angered by the Bishop's resistance, Malatesta caused the cathedral and the episcopal palace to be demolished. The precious materials were transported to Rimini and were used in the construction of the Tempio Malatestiano (San Francesco). Discussions in Rome following these events suggested that the diocese of Senigallia be united with the diocese of Jesi, but they never progressed beyond talk. Without a proper cathedral, Bishop Marco Vigerio della Rovere (1513–1560) moved his seat to the church called the Prepositura, where regular cathedral services, abandoned for a half century, were resumed.

A new cathedral was begun in 1540 under Bishop Marco Vigerio Della Rovere; it was consecrated in 1595 by Bishop Pietro Ridolfi (1591–1601). In 1682, when Senigallia was under the direct temporal dominion of the Holy See (Papacy), the cathedral of S. Pietro was served by a Chapter composed of three dignities and seventeen Canons. The dignities were: the Archpriest, the Provost, and the Archdeacon. The eight senior Canons were called the Antiqui, and were alternately appointed by the pope and the bishop when a vacancy occurred. Two other Canons were de jure Patronatus, and were appointed by the persons holding the right of patronage. The remaining ten, called Locatelli, were elected by the Council and Senate of the city, from the members of the nobility. On the cathedral staff there were also six mansionarii, elected likewise by the Council and Senate.

=== Synods ===
A diocesan synod was an irregularly held, but important, meeting of the bishop of a diocese and his clergy. Its purpose was (1) to proclaim generally the various decrees already issued by the bishop; (2) to discuss and ratify measures on which the bishop chose to consult with his clergy; (3) to publish statutes and decrees of the diocesan synod, of the provincial synod, and of the Holy See.

Bishop Pietro Ridolfi (1591–1601) presided over a diocesan synod held in the cathedral on 4 May 1591; its decrees were published.

Bishop Antonio Barberini (1625–1628) held a diocesan synod in Senigallia in 1627. The constitutions of that synod were republished and amplified by Bishop Rizzardo Isolani (1734–1742) in his diocesan synod of 29 June 1737.

== Bishops of Senigallia ==
=== to 1200 ===
- Venantius (attested 502)

Bonifacius ? (mid 6th century?)
Sigismundus ? (late 6th century?)
...

- Mauro (attested 649)

...

- Anastasius (attested 761)
- Georgius (attested 769)

...

- And - - (8th century ?)
- Paulinus (attested 826)

...

- Samuel (attested 853)
- Articarius (attested 861)
- Severus
- Ororius (Oirannus, Giranus)
- Beneventus (or Benvenutus) (attested 887)

...

- Atto (attested 968, 996)

...

- Adelbertus (attested 1028, 1036)

...

- Robertus (attested 1053)

...

- Theotius ? (attested 1059)
- Guinihidus (attested 1065, 1068, 1069)
- Guilelmus (attested 1070)

...

- Atto (attested June 1115/1116)

...

- Trasimundus (attested 1137, 1154)

...

- Jacobus (attested 1179)

...

- Alimannus (attested 1193)
- Henricus (1197–1199)

=== from 1200 to 1500 ===
...

- Trasmundus (attested 1218)
- Benno (attested 1223)
- Jacobus (attested 1232, 1270)
- Philippus, O.E.S.A. (attested 1271)
- J. (attested 1276)
- Fredericus (1284–1288)
- Trasmundus (1288–1291)
- Theodinus (1291–1294)
- Franciscus, O.Min. (1294–1295)
- Franciscus (1295–1297)
- Huguitio (Uguccio), O.P. (1297–c. 1305)
- Joannes
- Gratias
- Franciscus (1318–1321)
- Hugolinus (1321–1323)
- Fredericus (1323–1328)
- Joannes de Ancona, O.Min. (1328–1349)
- Hugolinus (Federicucci) (1349–1357)
- Joannes de Panaeis, 0. Min. (1357–1368)
- Christophorus de Regio, O.E.S.A. (1368–1370)
- Radulfus de Castello, O.E.S.A. (1370–1375)
- Pierre Amelii, O.E.S.A. (1375–1386)
- Joannes Firmani (1388–1394)
- Joannes (Faetani ?) (1394–1412)
- Lorenzo Ricci (1412–1419)

Giovanni
Angelo ?

- Simone Vigilanti, O.E.S.A. (1419–1428)
- Francesco Mellini (1428–1431)
- Bartolomeo Vignati (1431–1446?)
- Antonio Columbella (15 Dec 1447 – 1466 Died)
- Cristoforo di Bianprate, O.S.M. (1466–1474)
- Cardinal Marco Vigerio della Rovere, O.F.M. Conv. (1476– 9 May 1513 Resigned)

=== from 1500 to 1800 ===
- Marco Quinto Vigerio della Rovere (1513–1560)
- Urbano Vigerio della Rovere (1560–1570)
- Girolamo Rusticucci (16 Jun 1570 – 1577 Resigned)
- Francesco Maria Enrici (1577–1590)
- Pietro Ridolfi O.F.M. Conv. (18 Feb 1591 – 18 May 1601 Died)
- Antaldo degli Antaldi (26 Nov 1601 – 9 Jan 1625 Died)
- Cardinal Antonio Barberini (seniore), O.F.M. Cap. (26 Jan 1625 –1628)
- Lorenzo Campeggi (1628–1639)

Sede vacante (1639–1643)

- Cardinal Cesare Facchinetti (1643–1655)
- Francesco Cherubini (2 Aug 1655 – 24 Apr 1656 Died)
- Nicolò Guidi di Bagno (1657–1659)
- Claudio Marazzani (1 Sep 1659 – 25 Feb 1682 Died)
- Ranuccio Baschi (1682–1684)
- Muzio Dandini (1686–1712)
- Cardinal Giandomenico Paracciani (9 Jul 1714 – 18 Nov 1717 Resigned)
- Cardinal Lodovico Pico Della Mirandola (22 Nov 1717 – 10 Sep 1724 Resigned)
- Bartolomeo Castelli (11 Sep 1724 – 31 Dec 1733 Died)
- Rizzardo Isolani (5 May 1734 – 2 Jan 1742 Died)
- Nicola Manciforte (28 Feb 1742 –1746)
- Ippolito de Rossi (17 Jan 1746 – 21 Aug 1775 Died)
- Bernardino Honorati (28 Jul 1777 – 12 Aug 1807 Died)

=== since 1800 ===
- Giulio Gabrielli (11 Jan 1808 – 5 Feb 1816 Resigned)
- Annibale della Genga (8 Mar 1816 – 10 Sep 1816 Resigned)
- Fabrizio Sceberras Testaferrata (6 Apr 1818 – 3 Aug 1843 Died)
- Antonio Maria Cagiano de Azevedo (22 Jan 1844 – 18 Jul 1848 Resigned)
- Domenico Lucciardi (5 Sep 1851 – 13 Mar 1864 Died)
- Giuseppe Aggarbati, O.S.A. (22 Feb 1867 – 29 Apr 1879 Resigned)
- Francesco Latoni (12 May 1879 – 7 Jul 1880 Died)
- Ignazio Bartoli (20 Aug 1880 – 17 Oct 1895 Died)
- Giulio Boschi (29 Nov 1895 – 19 Apr 1900 Appointed Archbishop of Ferrara)
- Tito Maria Cucchi (19 Apr 1900 – 8 Sep 1938 Died)
- Umberto Ravetta (14 Nov 1938 – 20 Jan 1965 Died)
- Odo Fusi Pecci (15 Jul 1971 – 21 Jan 1997 Retired)
- Giuseppe Orlandoni (21 Jan 1997 – 17 Oct 2015 Retired)
- Francesco Manenti (17 Oct 2015 – )

== Bibliography ==
=== Reference works for bishops ===
- Gams, Pius Bonifatius (1873). Series episcoporum Ecclesiae catholicae: quotquot innotuerunt a beato Petro apostolo (in Latin). Ratisbon: Typis et Sumptibus Georgii Josephi Manz. pp. 700–701.
- Eubel, Conradus; Gulik, Guilelmus, eds. (1923). Hierarchia catholica (in Latin). Vol. Tomus 3 (second ed.). Münster: Libreria Regensbergiana.
- Gauchat, Patritius (Patrice) (1935). Hierarchia catholica. Vol. Tomus IV (1592-1667). Münster: Libraria Regensbergiana.
- Ritzler, Remigius; Sefrin, Pirminus (1952). Hierarchia catholica medii et recentis aevi. Vol. Tomus V (1667-1730). Patavii: Messagero di S. Antonio.
- Ritzler, Remigius; Sefrin, Pirminus (1958). Hierarchia catholica medii et recentis aevi. Vol. Tomus VI (1730-1799). Patavii: Messagero di S. Antonio.
- Ritzler, Remigius; Sefrin, Pirminus (1968). Hierarchia Catholica medii et recentioris aevi (in Latin). Vol. VII (1800–1846). Monasterii: Libreria Regensburgiana.
- Remigius Ritzler; Pirminus Sefrin (1978). Hierarchia catholica Medii et recentioris aevi (in Latin). Vol. VIII (1846–1903). Il Messaggero di S. Antonio.
- Pięta, Zenon (2002). Hierarchia catholica medii et recentioris aevi (in Latin). Vol. IX (1903–1922). Padua: Messagero di San Antonio. ISBN 978-88-250-1000-8.

=== Studies ===
- Cappelletti, Giuseppe (1845). Le Chiese d'Italia dalla loro origine sino ai nostri giorni (in Italian). Vol. terzo. editore Antonelli. pp. 377–410.
- Cucchi, T. M. (1931). Cronologia dei vescovi della Santa Chiesa senigalliese. Senigallia: Scuola tip. Marchegiana 1931. (in Italian)
- Kehr, Paul Fridolin (1909). Italia pontificia : sive, Repertorium privilegiorum et litterarum a romanis pontificibus ante annum 1598 Italiae ecclesiis, monasteriis, civitatibus singulisque personis concessorum. Tomus IV. Berolini, Apud Weidmannos. (in Latin) pp. 192–194.
- Lanzoni, Francesco (1927). Le diocesi d'Italia dalle origini al principio del secolo VII (an. 604). Faenza: F. Lega, pp.
- Mencucci, Angelo (1994). Senigallia e la sua diocesi: Senigallia dalle origini ad oggi (in Italian). Fano: Editrice Fortuna.
- Polverari, Alberto (1981). Senigallia nella storia. 2 volumes. Senigallia: Edizioni 2G, 1981. (in Italian)
- Schwartz, Gerhard (1907). Die Besetzung der Bistümer Reichsitaliens unter den sächsischen und salischen Kaisern: mit den Listen der Bischöfe, 951-1122. Leipzig: B.G. Teubner. pp. 240–241. (in German)
- Siena, Lodovico (1746). Storia della città di Sinigaglia (in Italian). Sinigaglia: Calvani. pp. 211–255.
- Ughelli, Ferdinando; Coleti, Niccolò (1717). Italia sacra sive De Episcopis Italiae, et insularum adjacentium (in Latin). Vol. Tomus secundus (secunda ed.). Venezia: Sebastianum Coleti. pp. 865–881.
