= Giovanni Francesco Guidi di Bagno =

Italian cardinal (1578–1641)

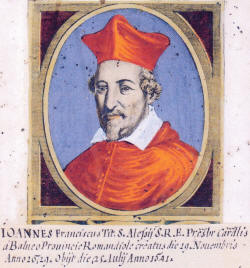
- Born: 4 October 1578; Florence, Grand Duchy of Tuscany
- Died: 24 July 1641 (aged 62); Rome, Papal States
- Other names: Gian Francesco Guidi di Bagno, Gianfrancesco Guidi di Bagno, Giovanni Francesco Bagni, Gianfrancesco de' Conti Guidi di Bagno
- Citizenship: Grand Duchy of Tuscany
- Education: Doctor utriusque juris
- Parent(s): Fabrizio Guidi di Bagno, Marquess of Montebello and Laura Colonna, Duchy of Zagarolo
- Relatives: Brother of cardinal Nicola Guidi di Bagno, nephew of cardinal Girolamo Colonna
- Religion: Roman Catholic
- Church: Roman Catholic
- Offices held: Papal Legate; Nuncio
- Title: Cardinal

Giovanni Francesco Guidi di Bagno (1578 – 1641) (also known as Gian Francesco Guidi di Bagno, Gianfrancesco Guidi di Bagno, Giovanni Francesco Bagni or Gianfrancesco de' Conti Guidi di Bagno) was an Italian cardinal, brother of cardinal Nicola Guidi di Bagno and nephew of cardinal Girolamo Colonna.

== Biography ==
He was born in Florence (Grand Duchy of Tuscany) 4 October 1578, eldest son of Fabrizio Guidi di Bagno, Marquess of Montebello, Province of Rimini, and Laura Colonna from the Duchy of Zagarolo.

Giovanni Francesco Guidi di Bagno studied law at the universities of Pisa and Bologne, literature and philosophy at the universities of Pisa and Florence and acquired a doctorate in both civil law and church law (Doctor utriusque juris).

In 1596, he received the commendation of the Abbey of St Mary of Mater Domini near Salerno. In 1597, he was appointed Protonotary apostolic, member of the college of protonotarii apostolici de numero participantium which was facilitated by his kinship with Cardinals Marcantonio and Ascanio Colonna.

In 1598, he was part of the Pope Clement VIII's retinue during his visit to Ferrara immediately after the devolution of the Duchy of Ferrara to the Papal States. In 1600, he was referendary in the Supreme Tribunal of the Apostolic Signatura.

Vice-Legate in the Marches and in Fermo from 1601 to 1606, Giovanni Francesco Guidi di Bagno was Governor of Orvieto (1607), Fano (1608), Fermo (1610) and of the Campagne and Maritime Province (1611).

In 1614, he was elected titular archbishop of Patras and appointed vice-legate of Avignon. The same year he became referendary of the Tribunals of the Apostolic Signature of Justice and of Grace.

Twice nuncio extraordinary in France in the pontificates of Pope Gregory XV and Pope Urban VIII, he was also nuncio at the Brussels court of the Infanta Isabella Clara Eugenia, 1621–1627.

He was elevated cardinal and reserved in pectore in 1627 and installed in 1631.

In 1630, in Paris, Cardinal Guidi di Bagno met Gabriel Naudé who became his librarian and secretary and accompanied him in 1631 to Italy, and René Descartes highly appreciated him.

He was appointed bishop of Rieti in 1635 and resigned in 1639.

Many contemporaries were convinced that [Guidi di Bagno] had all the qualities to be a worthy successor to Urban VIII. When Urban VIII fell seriously ill in 1637, Richelieu had [Guidi di Bagno] proposed as the official candidate for France. He was undoubtedly appreciated and regarded in many circles; he had the ability to behave independently in conflict situations and to maintain friendly relations even with personalities of different political persuasions. Precisely because of Richelieu's open support and because his partiality in the negotiation of the Franco-Bavarian alliance had not been forgotten, it is probable that the Habsburg party opposed his candidature, although no precise evidence of this is available.

— Rotraud Becker, "Guidi di Bagno, Giovanni Francesco", Dizionario Biografico degli Italiani (2004)

He died on 24 July 1641 (aged 62) in Rome. He was buried in the church Santi Bonifacio e Alessio.

Catholic Church titles
Preceded by Alessandro Piccolomini	Titular Archbishop of Patrae; 1614–1641	Succeeded by Ciriaco Rocci
Preceded by Lucio Sanseverino	Apostolic Nuncio to Flanders; 1621–1627	Succeeded by Fabio Lagonissa
Preceded by Bernardino Spada	Apostolic Nuncio to France; 1627–1630	Succeeded by Alessandro Bichi
Preceded by Bonifazio Bevilacqua Aldobrandini	Bishop of Cervia; 1627–1635	Succeeded by Francesco Maria Merlini
Preceded by Roberto Ubaldini	Cardinal-Priest of Sant'Alessio; 1631–1641	Succeeded by Mario Theodoli
Preceded by Gregorio Naro	Bishop of Rieti; 1635–1639	Succeeded by Giorgio Bolognetti
