= Cappella Paolina =

Chapel in the Apostolic Palace, Vatican City

Coordinates: 41°54′09″N 12°27′17″E

Location on a map of Vatican City

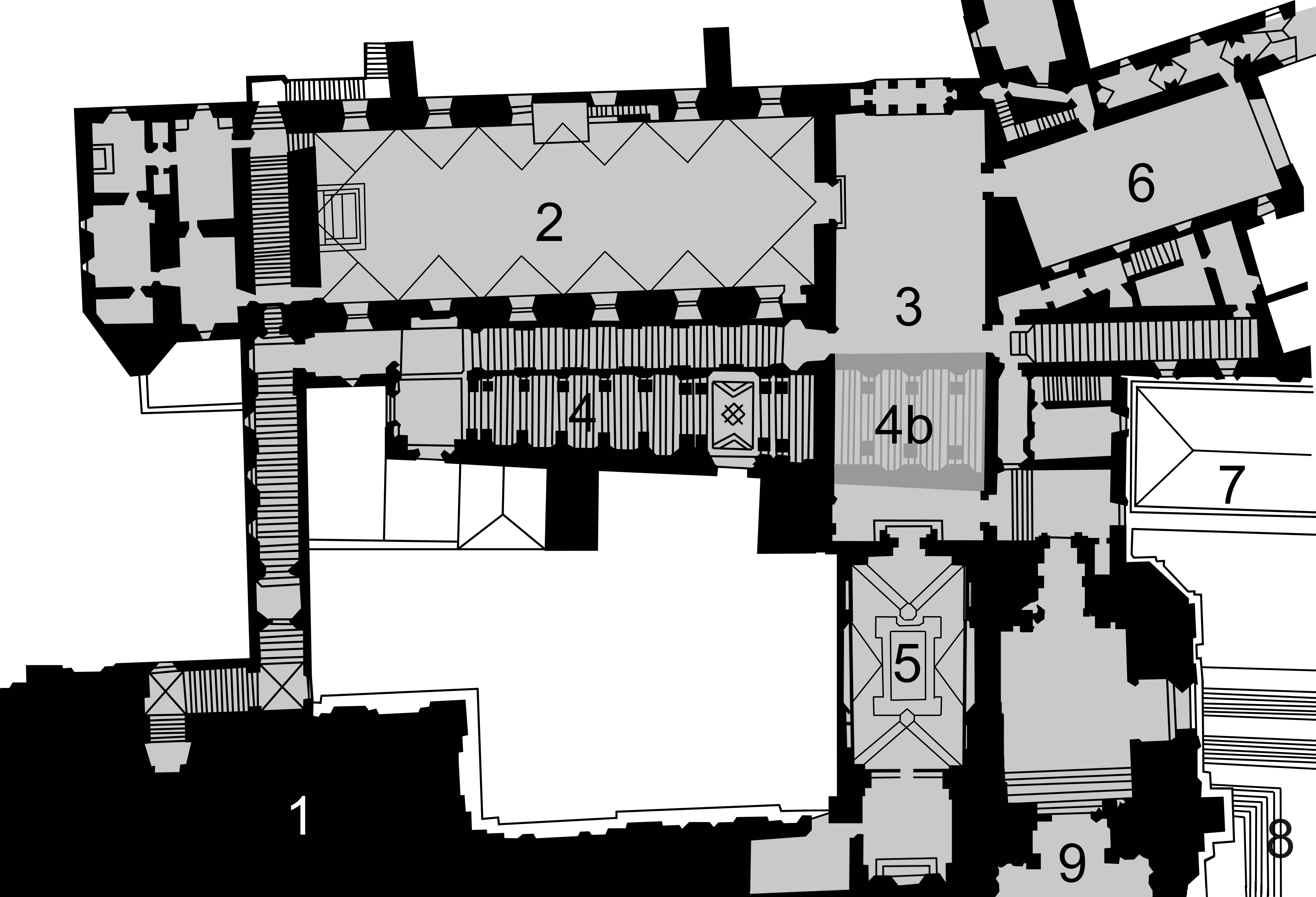
Floor plan of Cappella Paolina (5) and nearby places: Sistine Chapel (2), Sala Regia (3), Scala Regia (4 & 4b), Sala Ducale (6), the Northern arm of Bernini's colonnades (7)

The Cappella Paolina (the Pauline Chapel) is a chapel in the Apostolic Palace, Vatican City. It is separated from the Sistine Chapel by the Sala Regia. It is not on any of the regular tourist itineraries.

Michelangelo's two frescoes in the Cappella Paolina, The Conversion of Saul and The Crucifixion of St Peter were painted from 1542 to 1549, the height of his fame, but were widely viewed as disappointments and even failures by their contemporary audience. They did not conform to the compositional conventions of the time and the subject-matter is depicted in an unorthodox manner. Despite the importance of the chapel and the significance of their subjects, the frescoes were generally neglected and overlooked in favor of Michelangelo's nearby masterpieces in the Sistine Chapel.

An Italian scholar has recognised Michelangelo's face both in the Saint Paul and Saint Peter paintings by facial superimposition.

== Building and decoration ==
The chapel was commissioned in 1538 by the order of Pope Paul III and completed in 1540 under the design and supervision of Antonio da Sangallo the Younger. The Cappella Paolina served as both the Chapel of the Sacrament and the Chapel of the Conclave. Paul III dedicated the chapel to the Feast of the Conversion of St Paul, a festival to which he displayed particular devotion.

Given the ceremonial and personal significance of the chapel, it was to be expected that the Pope would require the services of a great artist for its decoration, and, in the opinion of both the papacy and the people, there was no one greater than Michelangelo.

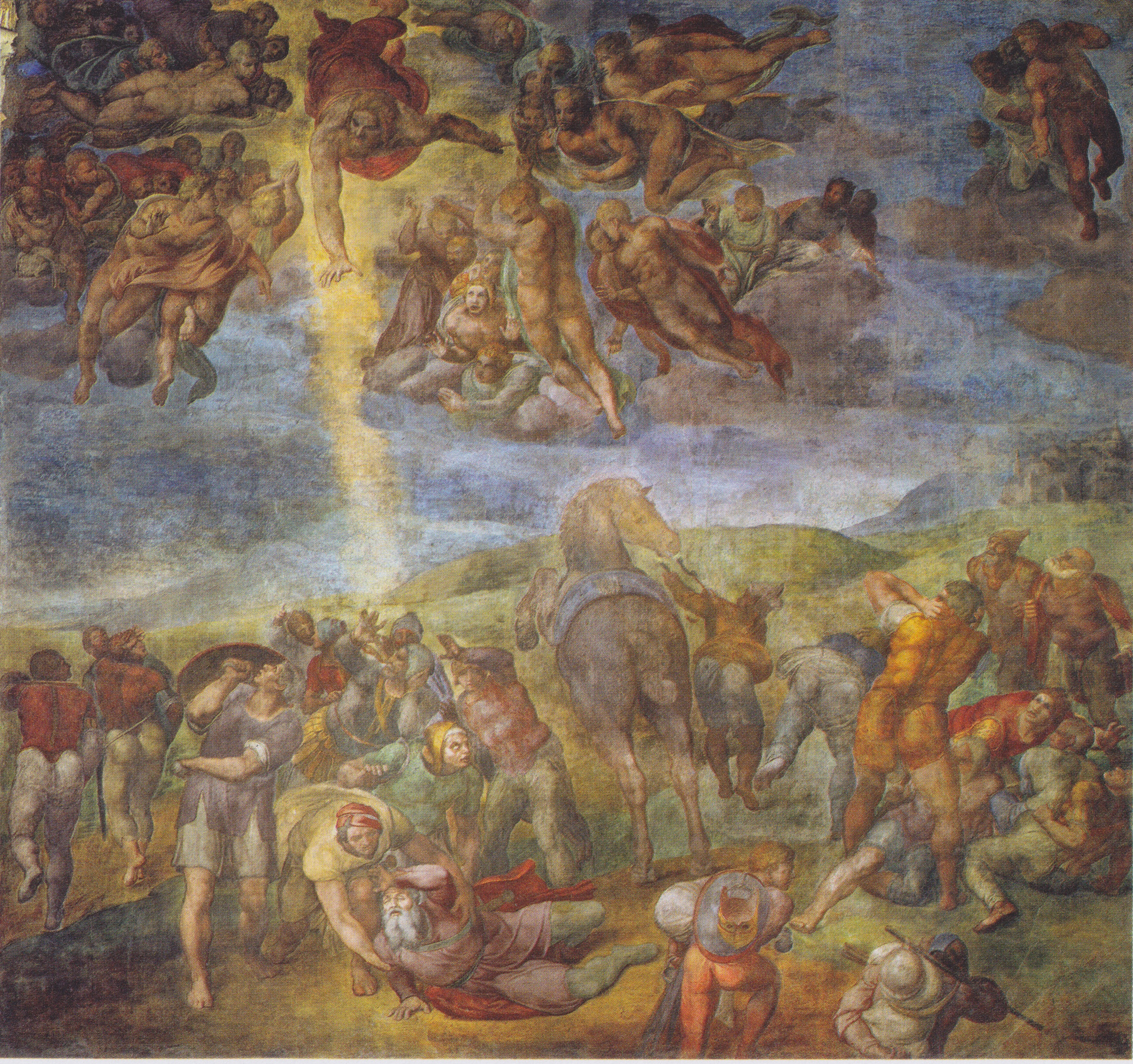
Michelangelo, The Conversion of Saul

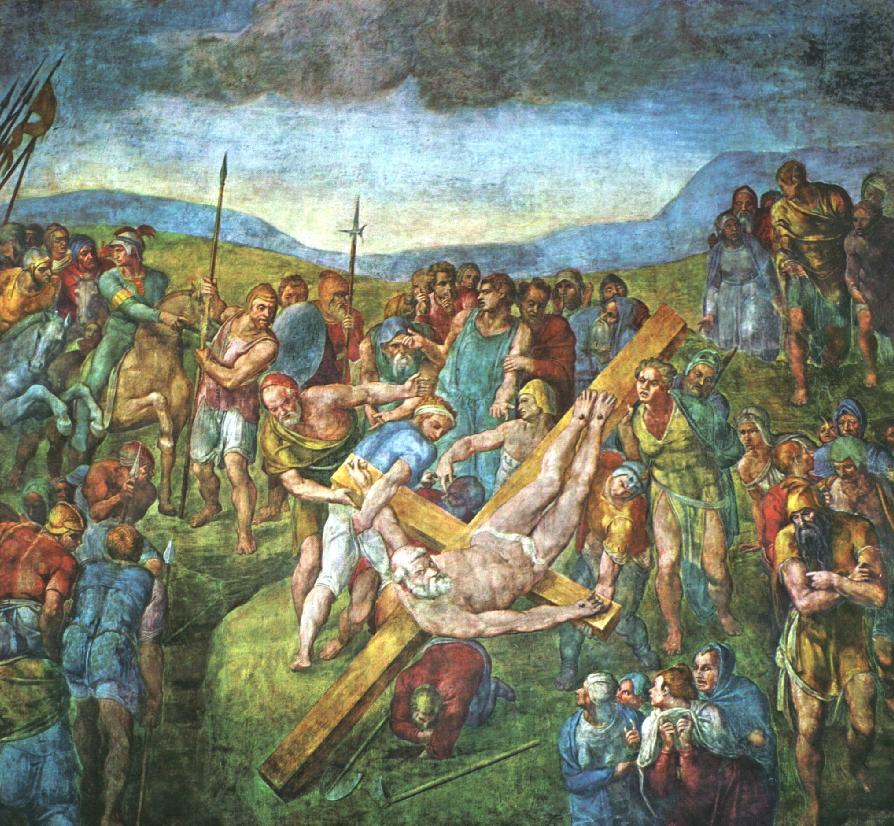
Detail of the Crucifixion of St. Peter by Michelangelo in the Cappella Paolina.

Even before the unveiling of Michelangelo's Last Judgment, Paul III had already decided that Michelangelo, who desperately wanted to fulfill his contract with the della Rovere for the Tomb of Pope Julius II, must paint the frescoes of the Cappella Paolina. This is shown by a letter dated October 12, 1541 from Cardinal Alexander Farnese, Paul III's nephew, to Bishop Marco Vigerio which discusses the paintings to be carried out in the "New Chapel."

S. J. Freedberg notes that the two frescoes in the Cappella Paolina, Michelangelo's last paintings, begun in November 1542, almost immediately after the Last Judgement, show from the start a major change in style, away from grace and aesthetic effect to an exclusive concern with illustrating the narrative, with no regard for beauty.

Other paintings in the chapel are by Lorenzo Sabbatini and Federico Zuccari. The statues in the background are by P. Bresciano.

== Use by papal conclave ==
Before the opening of a conclave, the College of Cardinals assembles in this chapel to attend a sermon in which the members are reminded of their obligation to quickly give to the Church her ablest son as ruler and guide. The cardinals then withdraw to the Sistine Chapel. In the Cappella Paolina are sung daily the conclave Solemn Masses "De Spiritu Sancto", at which all members of the conclave must be present.

In 1549 and 1550, the Cappella Paolina was used for the papal conclave itself, the Sistine Chapel having been set aside and divided into 19 cells for use by infirm cardinals. The conclave elected Pope Julius III.

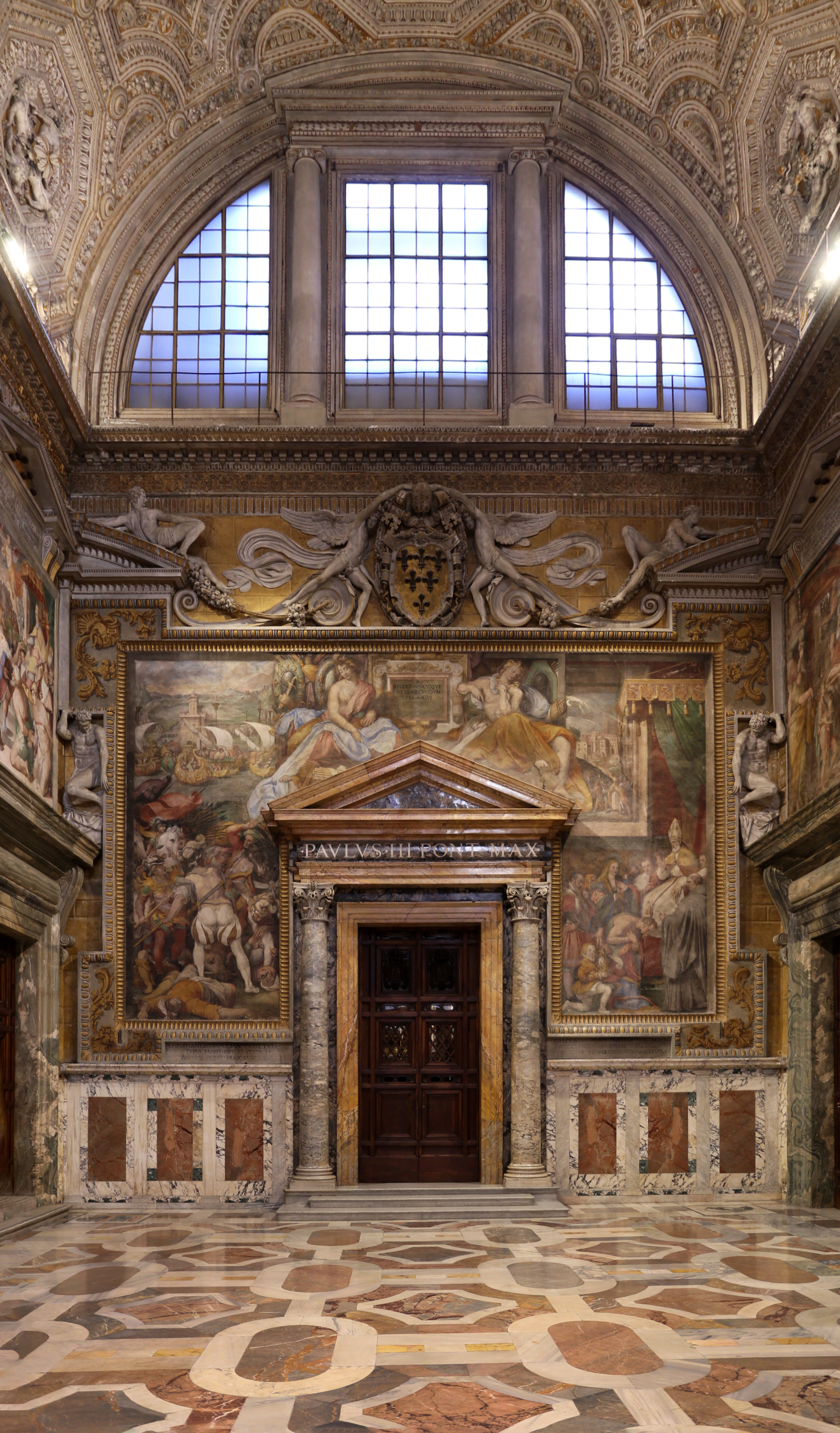
Sala Regia. The door at the end leads to the Cappella Paolina

The 1996 document Universi Dominici gregis stipulated the Pauline Chapel as the place where the cardinal-electors were to assemble at the beginning of the conclave prior to the procession and entry into the Sistine Chapel. However, due to restoration work that had begun in 2002, the chapel was unavailable for the 2005 conclave so the Hall of Blessings instead was used for this purpose. The restoration work was finished in 2009 and during the 2013 conclave the cardinal-electors assembled in the Pauline Chapel to begin their procession into the Sistine Chapel. The Pauline Chapel was also the venue where the non-cardinal officials, support staff and other personnel who had duties in the 2013 conclave took their oath of secrecy the day before the conclave.

The Pauline Chapel was also used in the 2025 conclave for the oath-taking of secrecy of personnel assisting at the conclave on May 5, as well as the gathering place of the cardinal-electors before processing to the Sistine Chapel on the afternoon of May 7. The cardinal-electors also celebrated Mass and Lauds in this chapel before beginning a full-day voting on May 8. When Pope Leo XIV was elected at the fourth ballot, he spent moments of prayer in the Pauline Chapel before appearing to the public for the first time as Pope.

== Restoration ==
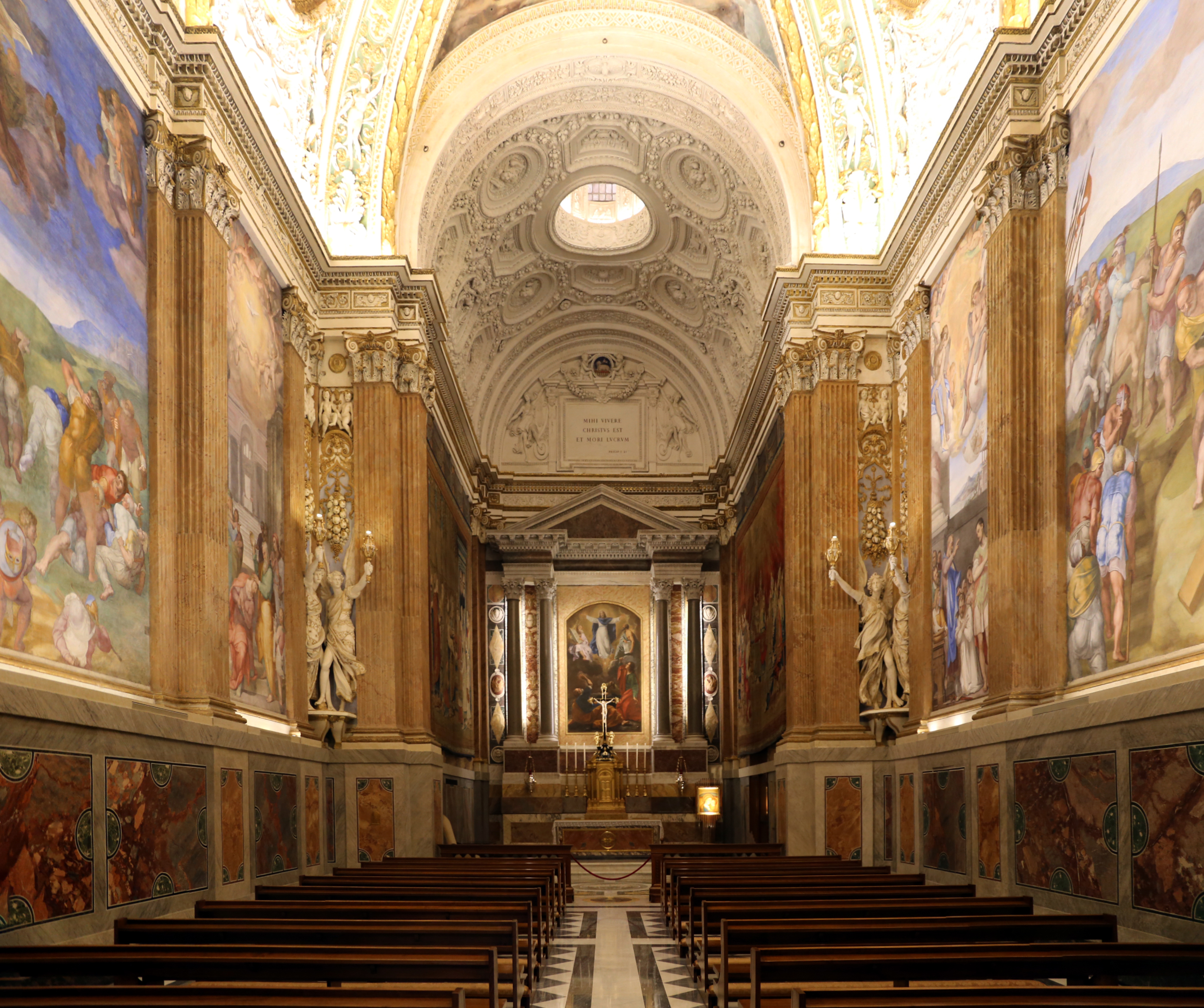
Cappella Paolina

In 2004, the Vatican announced plans to restore the frescoes in Cappella Paolina. Work was completed in 2009, revealing bright colors and hues that had been dulled by centuries of dirt and grime.

== Virtual reality presentation ==
In 2010, the Vatican website released a virtual reality rendered version of the Cappella Paolina. It presents the chapel in part 3D rendering and part high-resolution photography, unquestionably made after the 2009 restoration. This can be seen at https://www.vatican.va/various/cappelle/paolina_vr/.

== Other Cappelle Paoline ==
Two other chapels with the same name are in the church of Santa Maria Maggiore and in the Quirinal Palace, both in Rome.

== See also ==
- Index of Vatican City-related articles

== Sources ==
- Freedberg, Sydney J. Painting in Italy, 1500–1600, 3rd edn. 1993, Yale, ISBN 0300055870
