= The Conversion of Saul (Michelangelo) =

Fresco by Michelangelo

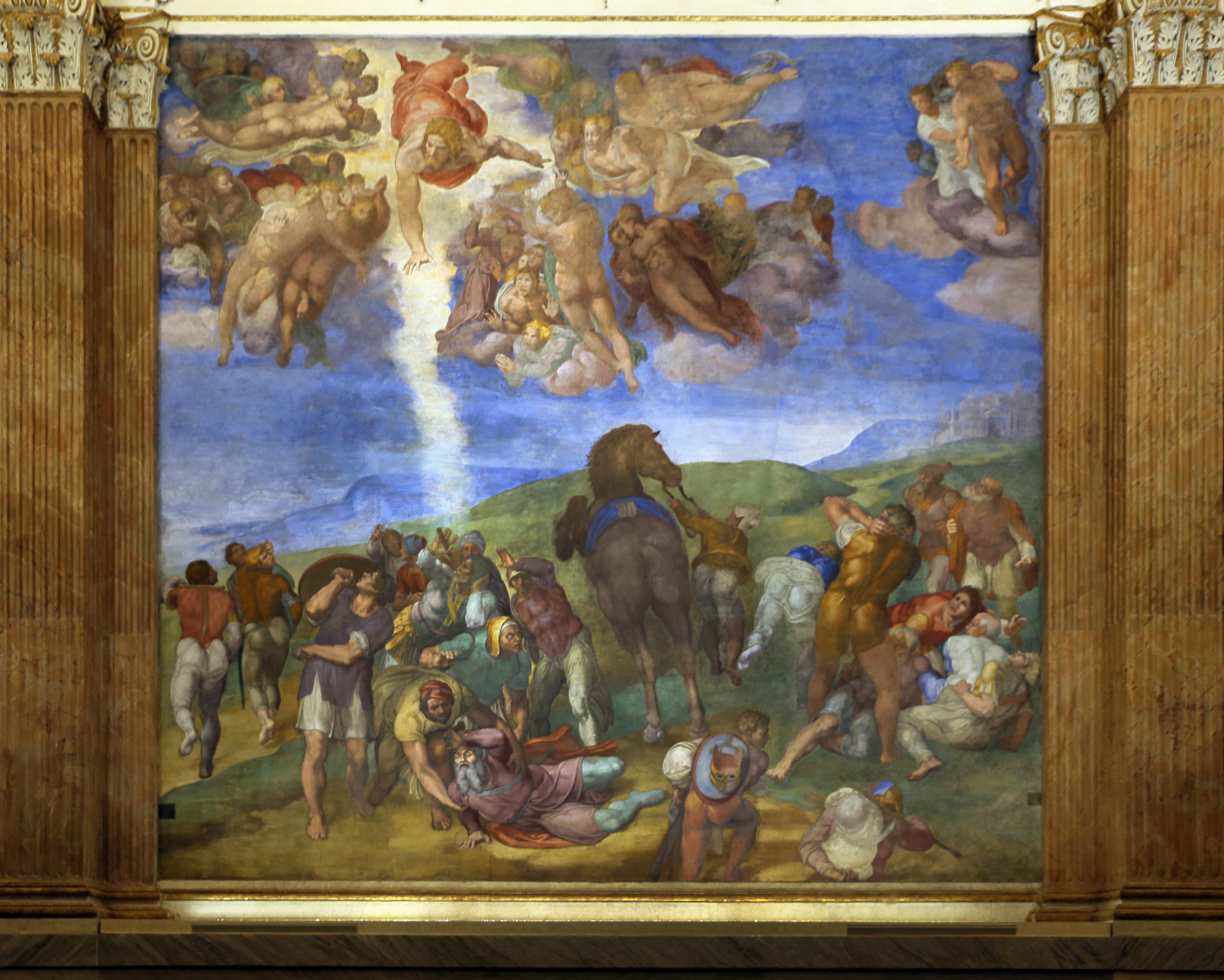
- Artist: Michelangelo
- Year: circa 1542–1545
- Type: Fresco
- Dimensions: 625 cm × 661 cm (246 in × 260 in)
- Location: Cappella Paolina, Vatican Palace; Vatican City
- Preceded by: The Last Judgment
- Followed by: The Crucifixion of St. Peter

The Conversion of Saul is a fresco painted by Michelangelo Buonarroti (c. 1542–1545). It is housed in the Pauline Chapel (Capella Paolina), Vatican Palace, in Vatican City. This piece depicts the moment that Saul is converted to Christianity while on the road to Damascus.

Pope Paul III commissioned the work for the chapel of his namesake. The chapel was built by Antonio da Sangallo the Younger in 1537 to 1538 with the patronage of Pope Paul III Farnese to serve as storage for the consecrated Host, and as the place where cardinals gather to elect a new Pope.

== Description ==
The figure of Christ is in the top left corner of the fresco. He is making a dramatic entrance into the scene, surrounded by a halo of light and a heavenly host of angels. Some of these angels look on in awe at the event occurring, while others act as a protective barrier between those things that are heavenly and divine and the earthly things below. A beam of light radiates from Christ down to a group of figures who are highly dramatized in their gestures and expressions. The most dramatic of these earthly figures is Saul. Saul has the face of an old man, though "we know and Michelangelo also knew it well that the calling of Saul on the road to Damascus occurred when he was about 30 years old." Saul's face reflects Michelangelo's own, who at this point was an old man also troubled by his faith. The figure of Saul represents "the human being in need of a greater light". Surrounding Saul is a triangular composition of companions who attempt to aid him as he lies recumbent on the ground. With one hand raised to shield himself from Christ, he has an expression of strange discomfort and fear. The downward sloping hills, the beam of radiant light, and the groupings of the figures surrounding Saul make it clear to the viewer that he is the most important person in this figure-heavy piece.

Further in the background is an outline of a city to contextualize the exact moment in which Saul is experiencing this divine intervention. On a journey to this city of Damascus in which he originally intended to arrest Christ's followers, Saul was converted to Christianity. While Saul lies helpless on the ground, some of his companions begin to pull out weapons and shields as though they are evading an enemy's attack. There is a tension to this scene that is only heightened by the individual expressions on each of the figures' faces. The people on earth range from fearful to concerned. Even the angels above seem shaken by Christ's actions.

As in most of his pieces, Michelangelo pays careful attention to anatomy, and gives great detail to the musculature and form of all the figures, whether clothed or nude. Even the horse shows some muscularity. Michelangelo's sources for anatomical knowledge were live models, dissections, and sculptures from antiquity. In his later works such as the Last Judgement and also in his Conversion of Saul, the muscularity of his figures have more of a strain to them than previous pieces. The muscles and anatomy seem contorted and elongated and the figures are in impractical poses. Yet, this approach to anatomy works to enhance the drama of the piece. These poses and movements create a tension to the scene and highlight the miraculous nature of the event occurring.

== Restoration ==
The work began restoration in 2002 and was finished in 2009. Methods included using a chemical solvent, ultrasonic curettes, and laser equipment. Restoration efforts revealed that Michelangelo not only painted in fresco, but he also painted in mezzo fresco and a secco. Mezzo fresco is a technique in which the artist paints the final, thin layer of plaster underneath the actual painting so that paint pigments only slightly penetrate the plaster. A secco is a technique in which the artist painted on dry plaster and was able to work more quickly and correct mistakes as opposed to other methods.

== See also ==
- List of works by Michelangelo
