= The Crucifixion of Saint Peter (Michelangelo) =

Fresco by Michelangelo

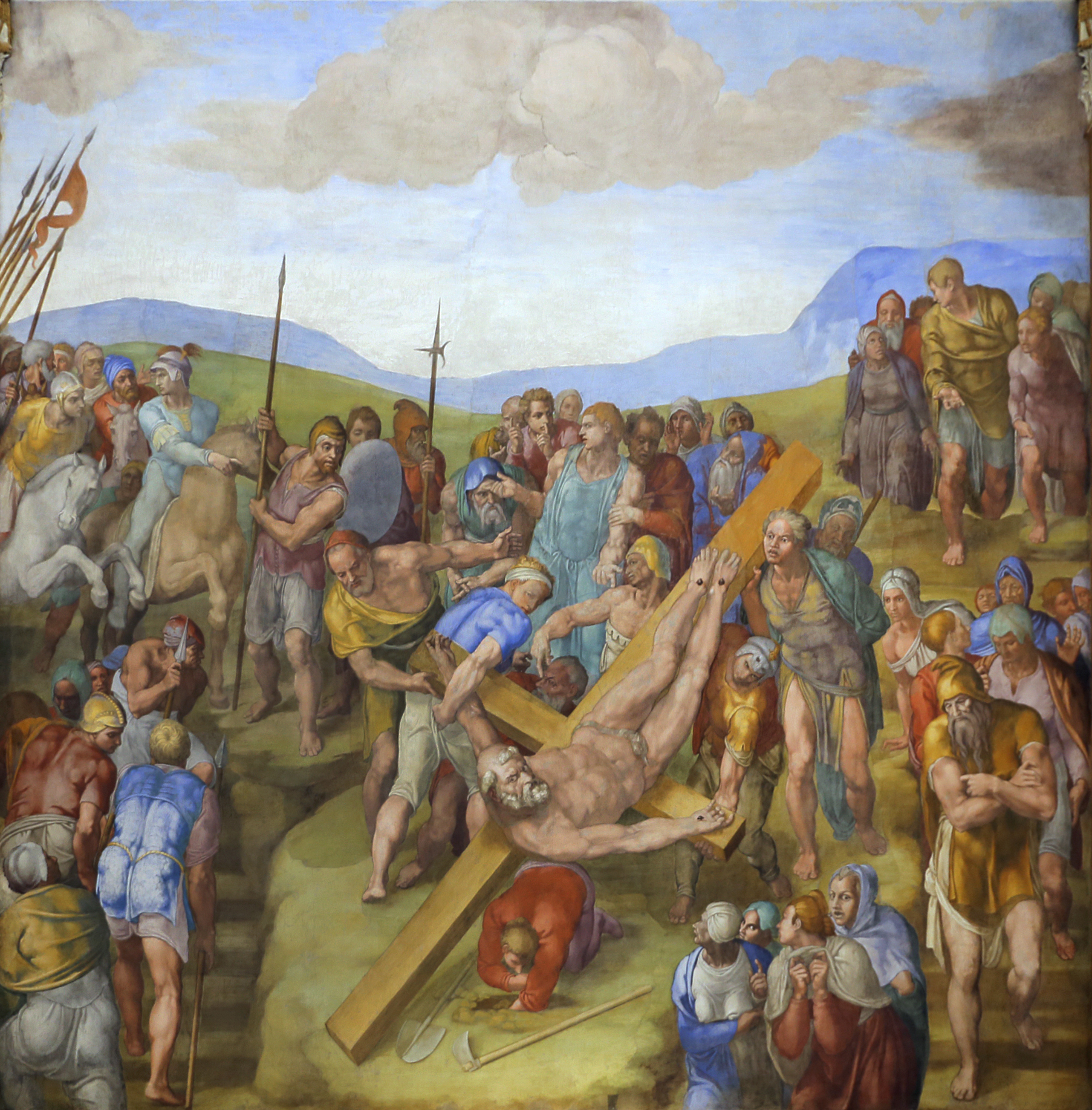
- Artist: Michelangelo
- Year: c. 1546–1550
- Type: Fresco
- Dimensions: 625 cm × 662 cm (246 in × 261 in)
- Location: Cappella Paolina, Vatican Palace; Vatican City
- Preceded by: The Conversion of Saul

The Crucifixion of Saint Peter is a fresco painting by the Italian Renaissance master Michelangelo Buonarroti (c. 1546–1550). It is housed in the Cappella Paolina, Vatican Palace, in the Vatican City, Rome. It is the last fresco executed by Michelangelo.

The artist portrayed Saint Peter in the moment in which he was raised by the Roman soldiers to the cross. Michelangelo concentrated the attention on the depiction of pain and suffering. The faces of the people present are clearly distressed. Pope Paul III commissioned this fresco by Michelangelo in 1541 and unveiled it in his Cappella Paolina.

Restoration of the fresco completed in 2009 revealed an image believed to be a self-portrait of Michelangelo. The figure is standing in the upper left corner of the fresco, wearing a red tunic and a blue turban. Blue turbans were often worn by Renaissance sculptors to keep the dust out of their hair.

== Saint Peter ==
Saint Peter is known by his many attributes, as "rock of the church", the "first vicar of Christ", or the first Pope. These attributes, specially the latter, made him the subject of many works of art in the Vatican. Saint Peter is depicted receiving the keys to the kingdom of Heaven from Christ on the wall of the Sistine Chapel in Perugino's Delivery of the Keys. Pope Paul III commissioned Michelangelo to paint yet another fresco of Saint Peter around the year 1545. In contrast to themes of power and glory depicted by Perugino, Michelangelo elected to paint a much darker moment in the saint's life. Saint Peter's status as a major martyr is not only because he was the "first vicar of Christ", but also because he was, like Christ, crucified. Although his final request is not mentioned in the canonical New Testament, it was popularly believed (due to the apocryphal text known as the Acts of Peter) that he demanded: "Crucify me head downwards, for I am not worthy to die as my master died." The Crucifixion fresco is situated on the eastern wall of the Pauline Chapel, which is significant because that is the location in which the cardinals have always held their elections for a new pope.

== Formal analysis and compositional elements ==
The backdrop to the scene is a minimally elaborated mountainous background. Michelangelo did not render this background in great detail. Giorgio Vasari states, "There are no landscapes to be seen in these scenes, nor any trees, buildings or other embellishments and variation." The mountains are painted in a faint blue hue, which perhaps is intended to increase the depth of field through atmospheric perspective. The land represented in the middle ground and foreground is a pale yellow-green that is in some places more of a yellow ochre in color. The only real vertical elements in the painting are the figures, which occupy most of the foreground. Many clusters of people surround a single large central figure mounted on a crucifix. The most impressive formal attribute of this painting (besides its considerable size) is its central compositional element. Unlike the many earlier representations of the martyrdom of Peter, this one depicts the raising of the cross – the moment before the crucifixion has truly begun. The angle of the crucifix activates the composition and creates much more dynamism in what might otherwise be a static image. The strong diagonal creates a cyclical visual pattern for the eyes to follow. If one reads the painting from left to right, the figures ascending the steps on the bottom left lead the eye upward towards a cluster of equestrian figures. They direct the eye to the group of people located on the top right corner, which in turn lead to one end of the crucifix. The other end of the crucifix points again to the men who are climbing up the steps. Michelangelo also created many strong diagonals with the placement of his figures and the extension of their arms and legs towards a central point of convergence. The position of Saint Peter's body in this work is often noted as Michelangelo's most interesting innovation. He defied convention by placing Peter's upper body so that he needs to crane upward and twist his neck to make eye contact with the viewer's gaze. This is a far cry from the painted visages of the final moments of countless martyrs, which is typically a passive uplifted gaze. The saint's penetrating stare suggests that he demands the witness of his audience; he demands their focus and gaze, and beseeches that his sacrifice not be deemed in vain.

== Criticism ==
These frescoes initially were derided from the very moment of their unveiling. Most of the criticism focused on what was considered a blatant disregard for proportion. Some attributed the failure of these frescoes to the artist's advancing age and declining health. Later, some scholars attributed the disproportionate nature of the figures to a Michelangelo's active pursuit of Mannerist technique. Steinberg refutes these claims by positing the fact that the characteristic stocky, muscular figures in this piece do not correspond to the lithe ideal body type preferred by Mannerists. Yael Even states that Michelangelo even went so far as to imbue the mourning female figures present in the painting with a more masculine quality.

== Newer interpretations ==
These frescoes were largely ignored for centuries and incurred a great deal of damage due to neglect. In the early twentieth century there were some scholars who came to reconsider the frescoes under the new light of expressionism and abstraction. The frescoes were restored in 1934 as a result of this newfound interest and the subsequent appreciation the paintings garnered. It was not until fairly recently (in the late 1980s) that a scholar by the name of William Wallace proposed an entirely new perspective on the subject. Wallace claims that the disproportionate quality of the figures is not a failing on the part of Michelangelo, but rather another instance of his genius. It is not even an instance of something new. In this particular case, Michelangelo used proportion in order to compensate for certain discrepancies caused by different perspectives. He designed the frescoes in accordance with what the viewer on the ground would see rather than the "ideal" frontal view most people see in photographs or reproductions. This proclivity for manipulating proportions for the sake of perspective or aggrandizing effects is something Michelangelo is known for. He notably employed these methods with the statue of Moses he carved for the tomb of Pope Julius II.

== Time and space ==
According to Wallace, the real innovation in this piece comes from the incorporation of time and space in the overall composition of the frescos. He postulates that Michelangelo designed the composition for these frescoes with the notion that they would be viewed as one walks down the central aisle of the narrow chapel in a processional manner. The appearance of both frescoes changes significantly as one walks from one end of the chapel to the other. The most popular point of contention in the case of The Crucifixion of Saint Peter is the inordinately large representation of Peter himself. While Peter is in fact grossly disproportionate from the "ideal" frontal view, he is perfectly proportionate (and, more importantly, always visible) from every other vantage point. Michelangelo actually used perspective to make the image something one can experience over time, giving it a somewhat "cinematic quality".

== Architectural and environmental context ==
Wallace states that in addition to conceiving of these frescoes in terms of perspective, Michelangelo also took into consideration the architectural and environmental context in which they were set. The Conversion of Saul (or of Saint Paul) is often discussed in conjunction with The Crucifixion of Saint Peter. In large part this is because the two frescoes were commissioned together, but this can also be attributed to how the two images were created as foils of one another. The Conversion of Saint Paul (as its title suggests) represents the conversion of a lawyer from Tarsus named Saul (a man who prosecuted Christians) into a follower of Christ. In the Book of Acts Paul states that he saw an impossibly bright light and heard the voice of Christ himself. The blindingly bright light is the apex of this story; it is because of this that Michelangelo chose to situate this painting on the western wall with the eastern exposure, so that the lunette situated above The Conversion of Saul would provide a bright light to illuminate it throughout the day. Conversely, with The Crucifixion of Saint Peter being a much darker story, it is situated on the eastern wall that faces west. Due to the obstruction caused by an adjacent building, this fresco is only lit for a very limited period of time at the very end of the day. Some speculate that this is part of the reason why it has been overlooked for so long. Wallace proposes that Michelangelo intended for this contrasting darkness to highlight the severity of the subject matter.

== Limited accessibility ==
Ultimately, despite the efforts of contemporary scholars to illustrate the genius behind these works, they remain relatively obscure. This is due primarily to the fact that tourists are not permitted to enter the Cappella Paolina because it is a sacred space. Most of those who do know of these works will never have the opportunity to see them in person. According to Wallace no other work by Michelangelo has ever been so grossly misrepresented in reproductions. The only way to view these works as the artist intended them to be seen is to see them in situ.

== See also ==
- List of works by Michelangelo
- The Conversion of Saul (Michelangelo)
- William Blake
