= Marco Vigerio della Rovere =

Italian bishop and cardinal

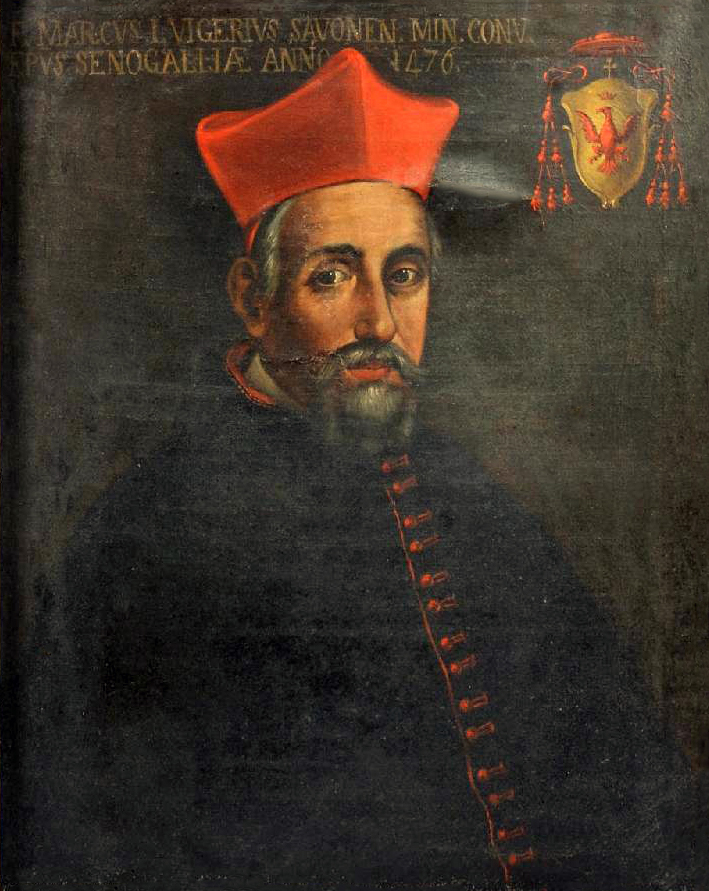
Marco Vigerio della Rovere

Marco Vigerio della Rovere (1446 – 18 July 1516) was an Italian bishop and cardinal of the Catholic Church.

== Early life ==
Emmanuele Vigerio della Rovere was born in Savona in 1446, the son of Urbano Vigerio and Nicoletta Grosso della Rovere, a niece of Pope Sixtus IV.

Vigerio studied Christian theology at Savona. He joined the Conventual Franciscans while his grand-uncle Francesco della Rovere (the future Pope Sixtus IV) was the Minister-General of the order. Upon joining the order, he changed his first name, which was originally "Emmanuele", to "Marco" in memory of his uncle, Marco Vigerio, Bishop of Noli.

He was subsequently ordained as a priest. In 1471, he became studium of the Abbey of Santa Giustina in Padua and professor of theology at the University of Padua. In 1474, he became professor of theology at the Sapienza University of Rome.

== Ecclesiastical career ==
On 6 October 1476, he was elected Bishop of Senigallia. He became Master of the Sacred Palace in 1484. On 24 January 1502, he was transferred to the see of Ventimiglia; he occupied that see until 1511. He was the governor of the Castel Sant'Angelo from 12 November 1503 until 31 July 1506. In 1506, he became Archbishop of Trani, occupying that post until 30 July 1517.

Pope Julius II made him a cardinal priest in the consistory of 1 December 1505. He received the red hat and the titular church of Santa Maria in Trastevere on 17 December 1505. In 1506, he accompanied the pope in the expedition against Giovanni II Bentivoglio and participated in the occupation of the Bologna. He was then papal legate to Bologna.

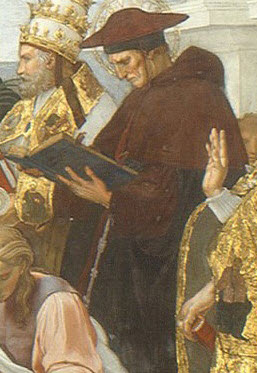
Cardinal Vigerio, in a detail from Raphael's Disputation of the Holy Sacrament.

He was the cardinal protector of the Minim Order. On 28 December 1507, he presided over a general chapter of the Minim Order, at which the mastership of Francis of Paola was discussed and disputes about the rule of the order were decided. For his work at this chapter, Cardinal Vigerio has been called the "second founder" of the Minim Order.

From 20 September 1508 to March 1514, he was governor of Capranica, Lazio. During the War of the League of Cambrai, he was named legate to the papal army on 11 December 1510. He participated in the planning of the conquest of Concordia sulla Secchia on 17 December 1510 and the victory at the Siege of Mirandola on 20 January 1511.

On 29 October 1511, he opted for the order of cardinal bishops and received the Suburbicarian Diocese of Palestrina.

He chaired several commissions at the Fifth Council of the Lateran, including a commission for the reform of the Roman Curia.

He participated in the papal conclave of 1513 that elected Pope Leo X. He accompanied the new pope at the congress held at Bologna from 11 to 18 October 1515.

He died in Rome on 18 July 1516 and is buried in Santa Maria in Trastevere.

He had an illegitimate son, Paolo Vigerio, by an unmarried woman, possibly a nun.

== Works ==
As a theologian, Cardinal Vigerio wrote many works on the life, death, and resurrection of Jesus Christ, as well as works on Jesus' shroud and the spear of Longinus. His theology is thought to have influenced Raphael's famous painting Disputation of the Holy Sacrament; the cardinal appears on the right of the painting, with the Franciscan habit and a cardinal's hat.
